= List of prehistoric echinoderm genera =

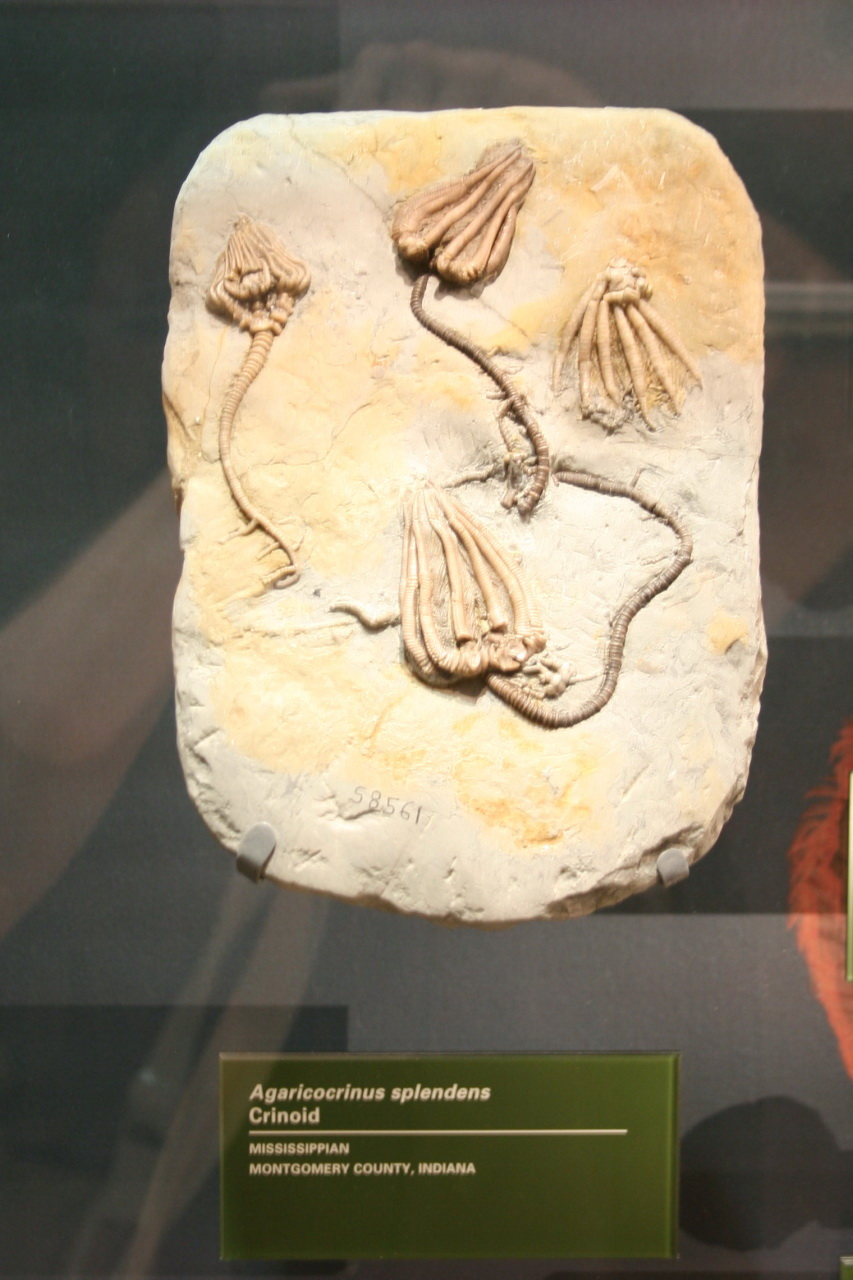
Agaricocrinus splandens

This list of prehistoric echinoderms is an attempt to create a comprehensive listing of all genera that have ever been included in the Echinoderms that have been preserved as fossils. This list excludes purely vernacular terms. It includes all commonly accepted genera, but also genera that are now considered invalid, doubtful (nomina dubia), or were not formally published (nomina nuda), as well as junior synonyms of more established names, and genera that are no longer considered echinoderms.

The list includes thousands of genera.

- Extinct genera are marked with a dagger (†).
- Extant genera are **bolded**.

== Naming conventions and terminology ==
Naming conventions and terminology follow the International Code of Zoological Nomenclature. Technical terms used include:

- Junior synonym: A name which describes the same taxon as a previously published name. If two or more genera are formally designated and the type specimens are later assigned to the same genus, the first to be published (in chronological order) is the senior synonym, and all other instances are junior synonyms. Senior synonyms are generally used, except by special decision of the ICZN, but junior synonyms cannot be used again, even if deprecated. Junior synonymy is often subjective, unless the genera described were both based on the same type specimen.
- **Nomen nudum** (Latin for "naked name"): A name that has appeared in print but has not yet been formally published by the standards of the ICZN. Nomina nuda (the plural form) are invalid, and are therefore not italicized as a proper generic name would be. If the name is later formally published, that name is no longer a nomen nudum and will be italicized on this list. Often, the formally published name will differ from any nomina nuda that describe the same specimen.
- **Nomen oblitum** (Latin for "forgotten name"): A name that has not been used in the scientific community for more than fifty years after its original proposal.
- Preoccupied name: A name that is formally published, but which has already been used for another taxon. This second use is invalid (as are all subsequent uses) and the name must be replaced. As preoccupied names are not valid generic names, they will also go unitalicized on this list.
- **Nomen dubium** (Latin for "dubious name"): A name describing a fossil with no unique diagnostic features. As this can be an extremely subjective and controversial designation, this term is not used on this list.

Contents:	A B C D E F G H I J K L M N O P Q R S T U V W X Y Z — See also

== A ==
- †Aacocrinus
- †Aaglacrinus
- †Aatocrinus
- †Abacocrinus
- †Abactinocrinus
- †Abathocrinus
- †Abatocrinus
- †Abatus
- †Abertella
- †Abludoglyptocrinus
- †Abrachiocrinus
- †Abrotocrinus
- †Abyssocrinus
- †Acacocrinus
- †Acanthechinus
- †Acanthocaudina
- †Acanthocrinus
- †Acanthocystites
- †Acantholepis
- †Acanthotheelia
- †Acariaeocrinus
- †Acariaiocrinus
- †Acentrotremites
- †Achistrum
- †Achradocrinus
- †Achradocystites
- †Acinetaster
- †Acolocrinus
- †Acriaster
- †Acrocidaris
- †Acrocrinus
- †Acrolusia
- †Acropeltis
- †Acrosalenia
- †Acrosaster
- †Actinocrinites
- †Actinophyma
- †Acuticarpus
- †Acutisclerus
- †Acylocrinus
- †Adacrinus
- †Adinocrinus
- †Adocetocystis
- †Adoketocarpus
- †Aduncrum
- †Advenaster
- †Adytaster
- †Aenigmocrinus
- †Aeolopneustes
- †Aepyaster
- †Aesiocrinus
- †Aethocrinus
- †Aexitrophocrinus
- †Affinocrinus
- †Afraster
- †Agalmaster
- †Aganaster
- †Agaricocrinus
- †Agassizia
- †Agassizocrinus
- †Agathocrinus
- †Agelacrinites
- †Aglaocrinus
- †Agmoblastus
- †Agnostocrinus
- †Agostocrinus
- †Aguayoaster
- †Ailsacrinus
- †Ainacrinus
- †Ainigmacrinus
- †Aithriocrinus
- †Akadocrinus
- †Albebarania
- †Albertechinus
- †Alcimocrinus
- †Alexandrites
- †Alisocrinus
- †Alkaida
- †Allagecrinus
- †Allanicytidium
- †Allionia
- †Allocatillocrinus
- †Allocentrotus
- †Allocrinus
- †Allocystites
- †Allomma
- †Alloprosallocrinus
- †Allosocrinus
- †Allosycocrinus
- †Allotoxaster
- †Allozygocrinus
- †Alpicidaris
- †Alsopocrinus
- †Altairia
- †Amaltheocrinus
- †Amarsupiocrinus
- †Ambicocrinus
- †Ambipleurus
- †Amblacrinus
- †Amblypgus
- Amblypneustes
- †Ambolostoma
- †Amecystis
- †Ammonicrinus
- †Ammotrophus
- †Amonohexacrinus
- †Amoraster
- †Ampelocrinus
- †Ampheristocrinus
- †Amphicrinus
- †Amphiope
- †Amphiophiura
- †Amphioplus
- †Amphipsalidocrinus
- †Amphitriodites
- †Amphoracrinus
- †Amphoracrocrinus
- †Amphoracystis
- †Amphorometra
- †Ampullaster
- †Ampurocrinus
- †Amygdalocystites
- †Amygdalotheca
- †Anaglyptocrinus
- †Anamesocrinus
- †Anarchocrinus
- †Anartiocrinus
- †Anartiocystis
- †Anatiferopsis
- †Anaulocidaris
- †Ancalocrinus
- †Anchicrinus
- †Ancistrocrinus
- †Ancoracrinus
- †Ancylocidaris
- †Ancyrocrinus
- †Andenothyone
- †Anechocrinus
- †Anemetocrinus
- †Angioblastus
- †Anglidiscus
- †Angulatoblastus
- †Angulocrinus
- †Anisaser
- †Anisocidaris
- †Anisocrinus
- †Anobasicrinus
- †Anomalocrinus
- †Anomalocystites
- †Anorthaster
- †Anorthopygus
- †Anthemocrinus
- †Anthoblastus
- †Anthracocrinus
- †Antihomocrinus
- †Antillaster
- †Antiquaster
- †Anulocrinus
- †Aorocrinus
- †Apatopygus
- †Aphelaster
- †Aphelecrinus
- †Apiocrinites
- †Apiocystites
- †Aplocoma
- †Apodactylocrinus
- †Apodasmocrinus
- †Apographiocrinus
- †Apoxypetalum
- †Applinocrinus
- †Aptilechinus
- †Apurocrinus
- †Apycnodiscus
- †Arachniopleurus
- †Arachnocrinus
- †Arachnocystites
- †Arachnoides
- †Araeocrinus
- †Araeosoma
- †Arbacia
- †Arbacina
- †Arbia (genus)
- †Archaechinus
- †Archaeocalyptocrinus
- †Archaeocidaris
- †Archaeocothurnus
- †Archaeocrinus
- †Archaeoisocrinus
- †Archaeometra
- †Archaeophiomusium
- †Archaepyrgus
- †Archaetaxocrinus
- †Archaster
- †Archegocystis
- †Archegonaster
- †Archiacia
- †Archophiactis
- †Arcuoblastus
- †Arenorbis
- †Argentinaster
- †Argoviaster
- †Arisaigaster
- †Aristocystites
- †Arkacrinus
- †Arkarua?
- †Arkonaster
- †Armathyraster
- †Armenocrinus
- †Arnaudaster
- †Arrectocrinus
- †Arroyocrinus
- †Arthraster
- †Arthroacantha
- †Artichthyocrinus
- †Artuschisma
- †Aryballocrinus
- †Asaphechinus
- †Asaphocrinus
- †Ascetocrinus
- †Ascocystites
- †Aspidaster
- †Aspidocarpus
- †Aspidocrinus
- †Aspiduriella
- †Asterias
- †Asteroblastus
- †Asterocidaris
- †Asterocystis
- †asterometridae
- †Asteronyx
- †Asterostoma
- †Asthenosoma
- †Astriclypeus
- †Astrocrinites
- †Astrocrinus
- †Astrocystites
- †Astrodapsis
- †Astrolampus
- †Astropecten
- †Astropygaulus
- †Asymmetrocrinus
- †Atactocrinus
- †Atactus
- †Ateleocystites
- †Atelestocrinus
- †Atelospatangus
- †Athabascacrinus
- †Athlocrinus
- †Atlasaster
- †Atokacrinus
- †Atopechinus
- †Atopocrinus
- †Atractocrinus
- †Atrapocrinus
- †Atremacrinus
- †Atyphocrinus
- †Aulocolatiaster
- †Aulactis
- †Aulechinus
- †Auliskocrinus
- †Auloblastus
- †Aulocrinus
- †Aulodesocrinus
- †Aurelianaster
- †Aureocrinus
- †Auricularites
- †Austinocrinus
- †Australanthus
- †Australaster
- †Australocystis
- †Austroblastus
- †Austrocidaris
- †Azygocrinus

== B ==
- †Babinocystis
- †Bactrocrinites
- †Baculocystites
- †Baerocrinus
- †Balacrinus
- †Balanocidaris
- †Balanocrinus
- †Balanocystites
- †Balearocrinus
- †Baliactis
- †Barbieria
- †Barnumia
- †Barrandeocarpus
- †Barrandeocrinus
- †Barycrinus
- †Basleocrinus
- †Basseaster
- †Bassleridiscus
- †Basslerocystis
- †Batalleria
- †Bathericrinus
- †Batherocystis
- †Bathronocrinus
- †Bathycrinus
- †Bathysynactites
- †Batocrinus
- †Baueria
- †Bdellacoma
- †Becharocrinus
- †Belanskicrinus
- †Belemnocrinus
- †Belemnocystites
- †Belochthus
- †Belocrinus
- †Benthocrinus
- †Benthopecten
- †Beryllia
- †Besairecidaris
- †Betelgeusia
- †Beyrichocrinus
- †Bicidiocrinus
- †Bihaticrinus
- †Bikocrinus
- †Bilecicrinus
- †Billingsocystis
- †Binoculites
- †Bistomiacystis
- †Blairocrinus
- †Blastocystis
- †Blastoidocrinus
- †Blothrocrinus
- †Bockia
- †Bogotacrinus
- †Bohemaster
- †Bohemiaecystis
- †Bohemicocrinus
- †Bohemura
- †Bokkeveldia
- †Bolbocrinus
- †Bolboporites
- †Boletechinus
- †Bolicrinus
- †Boliviacrinus
- †Bollandocrinus
- †Bostryclavus
- †Bothriocidaris
- †Bothryopneutes
- †Botryocrinus
- †Bourgueticrinus
- †Brabeocrinus
- †Brachiocrinus
- †Brachiomonocrinus
- †Brachisolaster
- †Brachyschisma
- †Brahmacrinus
- †Bramus
- †Breynia
- †Briarocrinus
- †Bridgerocrinus
- †Brightonia
- †Brightonicystis
- †Brisaster
- †Briseocrinus
- †Brisingella
- †Brissolampas
- †Brissomorpha
- †Brissopatagus
- †Brissopneustes
- †Brissopsis
- †Brissus
- †Brochechinus
- †Brochopleurus
- †Brockocystis
- †Bromidocrinus
- †Bromidocystis
- †Bronaughocrinus
- †Bruennichometra
- †Brutopisocrinus
- †Brychiocrinus
- †Buchicrinus
- †Bulbocystis
- †Burdigalocrinus
- †Bursacrinus

== C ==
- †Cactocrinus
- †Cadisocrinus
- †Cadocrinus
- †Caelocrinus
- †Caenholectypus
- †Caenocidaris
- †Cagaster
- †Cainocrinus
- †Calamocrinus
- †Calcancora
- †Calcancorella
- †Calcancoroidea
- †Calceocrinus
- †Calceolispongia
- †Calclamna
- †Calclamnella
- †Calclamnoidea
- †Calcligula
- †Calclyra
- †Caldenocrinus
- †Caleidocrinus
- †Caletaster
- †Calilampus
- †Calix
- †Calliaster
- †Calliasterella
- †Calliderma
- †Calliocrinus
- †Callocystites
- †Calocidaris
- †Calpiocrinus
- †Calycanthocrinus
- †Calycoblastus
- †Calycocrinus
- †Calyptactis
- †Camarocrinus
- †Cambraster
- †Cambroblastus
- †Cambroblastus
- †Cambrocrinus
- †Camerogalerus
- †Camptocrinus
- †Camptostroma
- †Campylostoma
- †Canadocystis
- †Canistrocrinus
- †Cantharocrinus
- †Capellia
- †Capsicocrinus
- †Carabocrinus
- †Carcinocrinus
- †Cardabia
- †Cardiaster
- †Cardiocystites
- †Cardiolampas
- †Cardiopelta
- †Cardioserra
- †Cardiotaxis
- †Caribbaster
- †Carlopsocrinus
- †Carneyella
- †Carolicrinus
- †Carpenteroblastus
- †Carpocrinus
- †Carpocystites
- †Caryoblastus
- †Caryocrinites
- †Caryocystites
- †Cassidulus
- †Castericystis
- †Catactocrinus
- †Cataraquicrinus
- †Catatonocrinus
- †Cathetocrinus
- †Catillocrinus
- †Catopygus
- †Caucacrocrinus
- †Cavanechinus
- †Celonocrinus
- †Celtocrinus
- †Cenocrinus
- †Cenomanaster
- †Centriocrinus
- †Centropygus
- †Centrostephanus
- †Ceramaster
- †Cerasmocrinus
- †Ceratoblastus
- †Ceratocrinus
- †Ceratocystis
- †Cercidocrinus
- †Certonardoa
- †Cestobrissus
- †Cestocrinus
- †Chaetasterina
- †Chaivella
- †Changninocrinus
- †Charactocrinus
- †Chariaster
- †Charientocrinus
- †Chariocrinus
- †Chatsworthia
- †Chauvelia
- †Chauvelicystis
- †Cheirocrinus
- †Cheirocystella
- †Cheirocystis
- †Cheiropteraster
- †Chelocrinus
- †Chelonechinus
- †Cheopsia
- †Chinacrinus
- †Chinianaster
- †Chinianocarpos
- †Chirocrinus
- †Chiropinna
- †Chladocrinus
- †Chlidonocrinus
- †Cholaster
- †Cholocrinus
- †Chomataster
- †Chondrocidaris
- †Chuniola
- †Cibaster
- †Cibolocrinus
- †Cicerocrinus
- †Cidaris
- †Cidaropsis
- †Cigara
- †Cincinnaticrinus
- †Cincinnatidiscus
- †Cionobrissus
- †Circopeltis
- †Clarkeaster
- †Clarkeocrinus
- †Clathrocrinus
- †Clavallus
- †Claviaster
- †Claviculacrinus
- †Clavidiscus
- †Cleiocrinus
- †Cleistechinus
- †Cleistocrinus
- †Clematocrinus
- †Clidochirus
- †Clistocrinus
- †Clonocrinus
- †Closterocrinus
- †Cluniaster
- †Clypeanthus
- Clypeaster
- †Clypeolampas
- †Clypeopygus
- †Clypeus
- †Cnemidactis
- †Coccaster
- †Codaster
- †Codechinus
- †Codiacrinus
- †Codiacystis
- †Codiopsis
- †Coeliocrinus
- †Coelocrinus
- †Coelocystis
- †Coelometra
- †Coelopleurus
- †Coenocystis
- †Coleicarpus
- †Collbatothuria
- †Colliclypeus
- †Collyrites
- †Collyropsis
- †Colpodecrinus
- †Colpotiara
- †Columbicrinus
- †Columbocystis
- †Comanthocrinus
- †Comarocystites
- †Comaster
- †Comatulina
- †Compagicrinus
- †Compsaster
- †Compsocrinus
- †Comptonia
- †Condylocrinus
- †Conisia
- †Conoclypus
- †Conocrinus
- †Conoideocrinus
- †Conometra
- †Contignatindocrinus
- †Contocrinus
- †Conuloblastus
- †Conulus
- †Coollarocrinus
- †Cooperidiscus
- †Coptodiscus
- †Coraster
- †Cordyloblastus
- †Cordylocrinus
- †Corechinus
- †Corematocrinus
- †Cornucrinus
- †Corocrinus
- †Coronocrinus
- †Coronocystis
- †Corthya
- †Corylocrinus
- †Corynecrinus
- †Coryslus
- †Corythocrinus
- †Cosmatites
- †Cosmetocrinus
- †Cosmocrinus
- †Costalocrinus
- †Costatoblastus
- †Costigerites
- †Cothurnocystis
- †Cottaldia
- †Cotteaudia
- †Cottreauaster
- †Cottreaucorys
- †Cotylacrina
- †Cotylederma
- †Cradeocrinus
- †Cranocrinus
- †Craspedocrinus
- †Crataegocrinus
- †Crateraster
- †Craterocrinus
- †Cravenechinus
- †Cremacrinus
- †Crepidosoma
- †Cribanocrinus
- †Cribroblastus
- †Cricocrinus
- †Crinerocrinus
- †Crinobrachiatus
- †Crinocidaris
- †Cromyocrinus
- †Croneisites
- †Crotalocrinites
- †Crucibrissus
- †Crucivirga
- †Cryphiocrinus
- †Cryptanisocrinus
- †Cryptechinus
- †Cryptoblastus
- †Cryptocrinites
- †Cryptogoleus
- †Cryptoschisma
- †Ctenocrinus
- †Ctenocystis
- †Ctenoimbricata
- †Ctenophoraster
- †Cubanaster
- †Cucumarites
- †Culicocrinus
- †Culmicrinus
- †Cunctocrinus
- †Cuneaster
- †Cuniculocystis
- †Cupressocrinites
- †Cupulocorona
- †Cupulocrinus
- †Curteocrinus
- †Curvatella
- †Curvitriordo
- †Cusacrinus
- †Cyamidia
- †Cyathidium
- †Cyathocidaris
- †Cyathocrinites
- †Cyathocystis
- †Cyathotheca
- †Cyclaster
- †Cyclocrinus
- †Cyclocystoides
- †Cyclolampas
- †Cydonocrinus
- †Cydrocrinus
- †Cylicocrinus
- †Cyliocrinus
- †Cymbiocrinus
- †Cymbionites
- †Cypelometra
- †Cyphocrinus
- †Cyrtocrinus
- †Cystaster
- †Cystoblastus
- †Cytidocrinus
- †Cytocrinus
- †Cyttarocrinus

== D ==
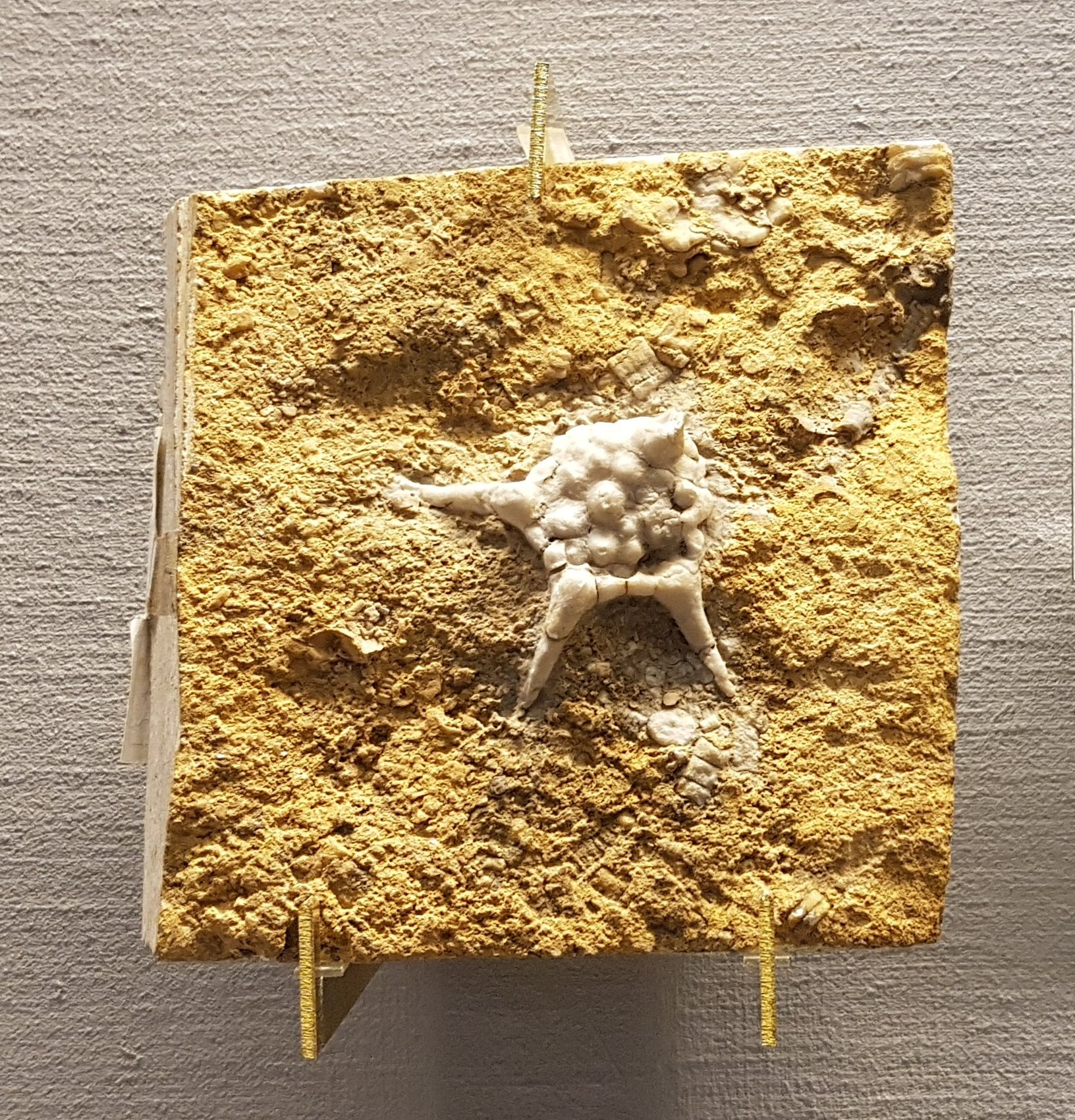
Dorycrinus

- †Dactylocrinus
- †Dactylocystis
- †Dadocrinus
- †Daedalocrinus
- †Dalejocystis
- †Daradaster
- †Darraghcrinus
- †Dasciocrinus
- †Dazhucrinus
- †Decacystis
- †Decadocrinus
- †Decameros
- †Decaschisma
- †Decemoblastus
- †Dehmicystis
- †Deliablastus
- †Delocidaris
- †Delocrinus
- †Deltacrinus
- †Deltacystis
- †Deltadiscus
- †Deltoblastus
- †Democrinus
- †Denarioacrocrinus
- †Denariocrinus
- †Dendraster
- †Dendrocrinus
- †Dendrocystites
- †Dendrocystoides
- †Denebia
- †Deneechinus
- †Dentiblastus
- †Denticrinus
- †Deocrinus
- †Depaocrinus
- †Derbiocrinus
- †Dermaster
- †Desmacriocrinus
- †Desmechinus
- †Desmidocrinus
- †Desorella
- †Destombesia
- †Devonaster
- †Devonistella
- †Devonoblastus
- †Devonocidaris
- †Diabolocrinus
- †Diadema
- †Diademopsis
- †Dialutocrinus
- †Dialyaster
- †Diamenocrinus
- †Diamphidiocystis
- †Diaphorocrinus
- †Diatorocrinus
- †Dibrachiocrinus
- †Dichocrinus
- †Dichostreblocrinus
- †Dicirrocrinus
- †Diclidaster
- †Dicromyocrinus
- †Dictenocrinus
- †Dictyopleurus
- †Dictyothurites
- †Dicyclocidaris
- †Dieuryocrinus
- †Difficilicrinus
- †Dilatocrinus
- †Dimerocrinites
- †Dinacrocrinus
- †Dinardocrinus
- †Dinocystis
- †Dinotocrinus
- †Diphuicrinus
- †Diplechinus
- †Diploblastus
- †Diplocidaris
- †Diplocrinus
- †Diplodetus
- †Diplopodia
- †Diploporaster
- †Diplosalenia
- †Diplotagma
- †Dipteroblastus
- †Disaster
- †Discholectypus
- †Discocrinus
- †Discocystis
- †Discoides
- †Discometra
- †Displodocrinus
- †Distefanaster
- †Ditremaster
- †Dixieus
- †Dixonia
- †Dizygocrinus
- †Dolatocrinus
- †Dolerocrinus
- †Dolichoblastus
- †Dolichocrinus
- †Doliocrinus
- †Domechinus
- †Domfrontia
- †Doreckicrinus
- †Dorocidaris
- †Doryblastus
- †Dorycrinus
- †Douvillaster
- †Drepanaster
- †Drepanocarpos
- †Drymocrinus
- †Dubarechinus
- †Dulanocrinus
- †Dumblea
- †Duncaniaster
- †Duncanicrinus
- †Dunnicrinus
- †Duperieria
- †Durhamella
- †Dwortsowaecrinus
- †Dystactocrinus

== E ==
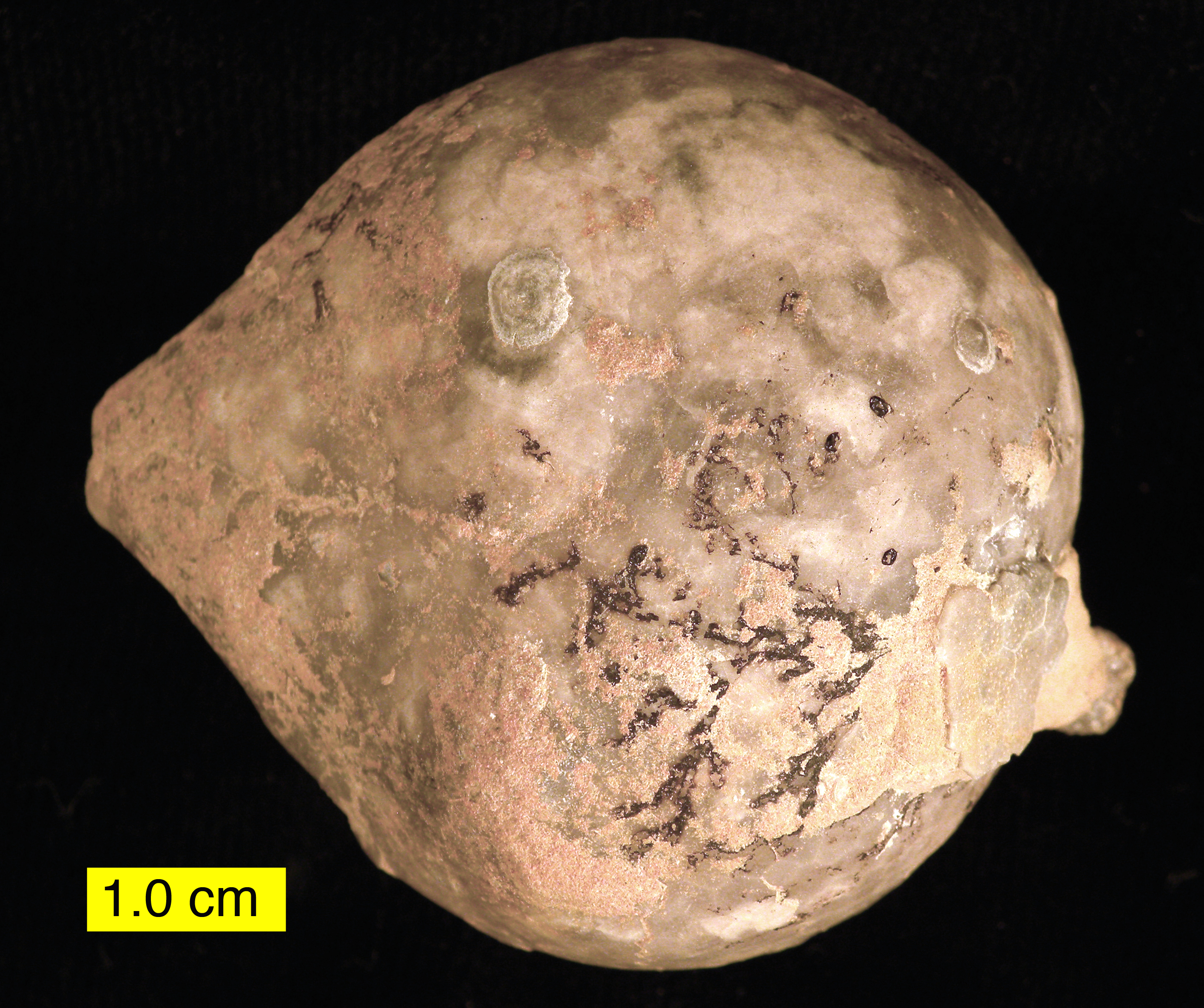
Cystoid Echinosphaerites, Ordovician, Estonia.

- †Echicrinus
- †Echinanthus
- †Echinarachnius
- †Echinaster
- †Echinasterella
- †Echinocardium
- †Echinocorys
- †Echinocyamus
- †Echinocyphus
- †Echinocyphus
- †Echinocystites
- †Echinodiscus
- †Echinoencrinites
- †Echinogalerus
- †Echinolampas
- †Echinometra
- †Echinoneus
- †Echinopedina
- †Echinopsis
- †Echinosphaerites
- †Echinostrephus
- †Echinothuria
- †Echinotiara
- †Echinus
- †Echmatocrinus
- †Eckidocrinus
- †Ectenocrinus
- †Ectinechinus
- †Ectocrinus
- †Edapocrinus
- †Edrioaster
- †Edriocrinus
- †Edriodiscus
- †Edriophus
- †Eidosocrinus
- †Eifelocrinus
- †Eireocrinus
- †Eirmocrinus
- †Elaeacrinus
- †Eleutherocrinus
- †Elgerius
- †Elibatocrinus
- †Elicrinus
- †Ellipsechinus
- †Ellipticoblastus
- †Elpasocrinus
- †Elpidocrinus
- †Embryocrinus
- †Emperocrinus
- †Enallocrinus
- †Enallopneustes
- †Enascocrinus
- †Encope
- †Encrinaster
- †Encrinus
- †Endelocrinus
- †Endeodiadema
- †Engelia
- †Enichaster
- †Enoploura
- †Entomaster
- †Eoactis
- †Eocamptocrinus
- †Eocaudina
- †Eocicerocrinus
- †Eocomatula
- †Eocystites
- †Eodiadema
- †Eogaleropygus
- †Eohalysiocrinus
- †Eoindocrinus
- †Eokainaster
- †Eomyelodactylus
- †Eoparisocrinus
- †Eopatelliocrinus
- †Eophiura
- †Eopilidiocrinus
- †Eopinnacrinus
- †Eosalenia
- †Eoscutella
- †Eoscutum
- †Eospondylus
- †Eostella
- †Eothuria
- †Eperisocrinus
- †Epiaster
- †Epihalysiocrinus
- †Epipaston
- †Epipetschoracrinus
- †Eratocrinus
- †Erbechinus
- †Eretmocrinus
- †Erinocystis
- †Erisocrinus
- †Espanocrinus
- †Esthonocrinus
- †Estonocystis
- †Ethelocrinus
- †Etheridgella
- †Etoctenocystis
- †Eucalyptocrinites
- †Eucatillocrinus
- †Eucidaris
- †Eucladia
- †Eucladocrinus
- †Eucystis
- †Eudesicrinus
- †Eudimerocrinus
- †Euerisocrinus
- †Eugeniacrinites
- †Euhydrodiskos
- †Eumitrocystella
- †Eumorphocrinus
- †Eumorphocystis
- †Euonychocrinus
- †Eupachycrinus
- †Eupatagus
- †Euptychocrinus
- †Eurhodia
- †Euryoblastus
- †Euryocrinus
- †Eurypetalum
- †Eurypneustes
- †Eurysalenia
- †Euspirocrinus
- †Eustenocrinus
- †Eustypocystis
- †Eutaxocrinus
- †Eutelecrinus
- †Euthemon
- †Eutretocystis
- †Eutrochocrinus
- †Euzonosoma
- †Evechinus
- †Exaetocrinus
- †Exlinella
- †Exochocrinus
- †Exocrinus
- †Exoriocrinus
- †Exsulacrinus
- †Exterocrinus

== F ==
- †Fanulodiscus
- †Faorina
- †Farquharsonia
- †Faujasia
- †Fauraster
- †Fayoumaster
- †Fellaster
- †Fellius
- †Fernandezaster
- †Fibularia
- †Fibulaster
- †Fibulina
- †Fifeocrinus
- †Firmacidaris
- †Fishericrinus
- †Fissobractites
- †Foerstecystis
- †Foerstediscus
- †Foliaster
- †Follicrinus
- †Fomalhautia
- †Forbesiaster
- †Forbesiocrinus
- †Forthocrinus
- †Fossulaster
- †Fournierechinus
- †Fourtaunia
- †Frankocrinus
- †Frizzellus
- †Fungocystites
- †Furcaster

== G ==
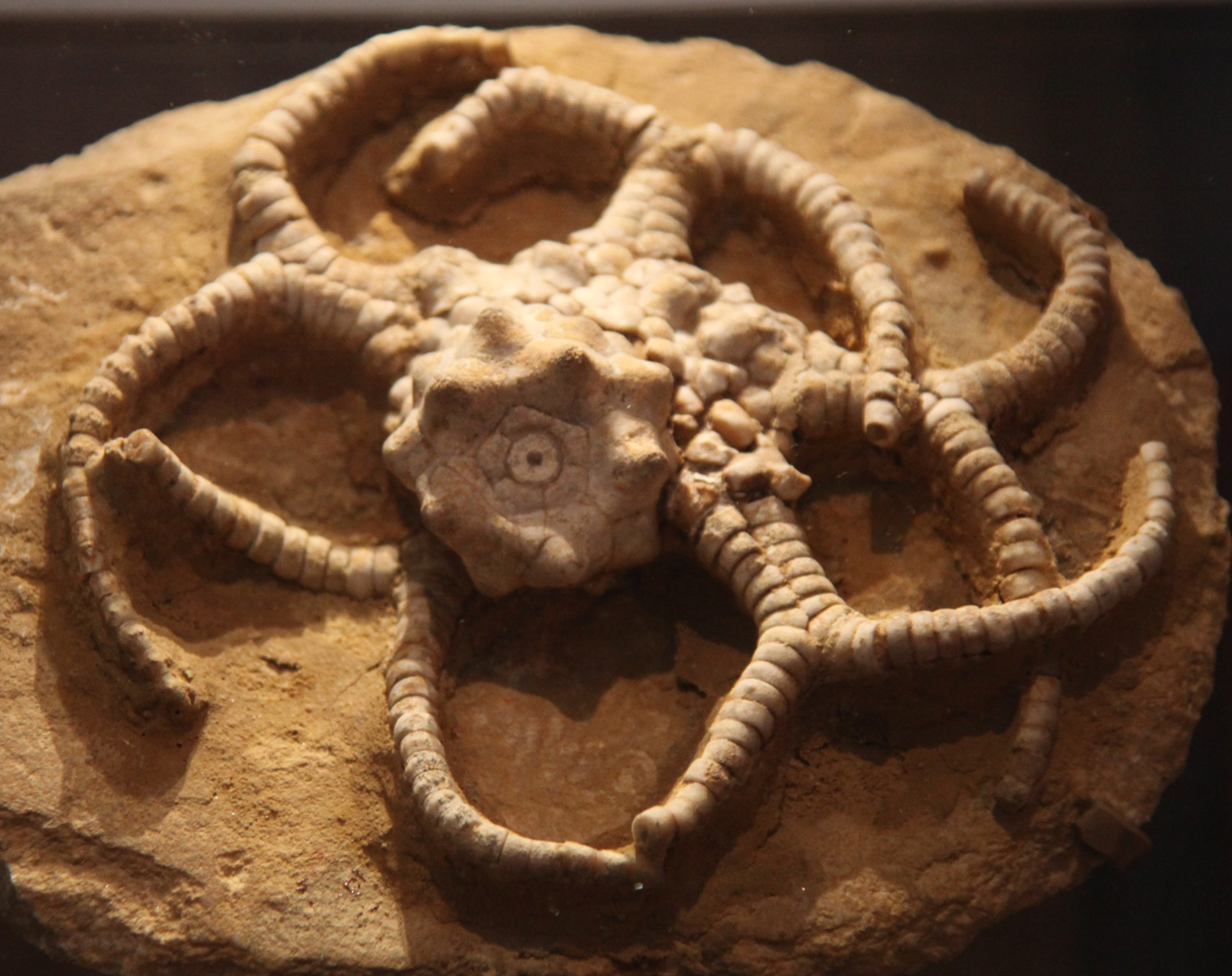
Gilbertsocrinus typus.

- †Gagaria
- †Galateacrinus
- †Galeaster
- †Galeola
- †Galeraster
- †Galerites
- †Galeroclypeus
- †Galeropygus
- †Galliaecystis
- †Gammarocrinites
- †Ganbirretia
- †Garumnaster
- †Gasterocoma
- †Gastrocrinus
- †Gaulocrinus
- †Gaurocrinus
- †Gauthieria
- †Gauthiosoma
- †Gazacrinus
- †Gemmacrinus
- †Gennaeocrinus
- †Gentilia
- †Geocoma
- †Geraocrinus
- †Germanasterias
- †Geroldicrinus
- †Gibbaster
- †Giganticlavus
- †Gilbertsocrinus
- †Gillechinus
- †Gillocystis
- †Gilmocrinus
- †Giraliaster
- †Girvanaster
- †Girvanicystis
- †Gissocrinus
- †Gitolampas
- †Glansicystis
- †Glaphyocrinus
- †Glaphyrocystis
- †Glaucocrinus
- †Glaukosocrinus
- †Glenotremites
- †Globacrocrinus
- †Globator
- †Globoblastus
- †Globocrinus
- †Globulocystites
- †Glossocrinus
- †Glyphocyphus
- †Glyphopneustes
- †Glypotocidaris
- †Glyptechinus
- †Glypticus
- †Glyptocrinus
- †Glyptocyphus
- †Glyptocystella
- †Glyptocystites
- †Glyptosphaerites
- †Glyptosphaeronites
- †Gnorimocrinus
- †Gogia
- †Goleocrinus
- †Gomphechinus
- †Gomphocystites
- †Gongrochanus
- †Gongrocrinus
- †Gongyloblastus
- †Goniocidaris
- †Goniocrinus
- †Goniophorus
- †Goniopygus
- †Goniosigma
- †Gonzalezaster
- †gorgonocephalid
- †Gothocrinus
- †Gotlandechinus
- †Gracilechinus
- †Graffhamicrinus
- †Grammechinus
- †Granatocrinus
- †Granobrissoides
- †Graphepleurus
- †Graphiocrinus
- †Grasia
- †Grenprisia
- †Griphocrinus
- †Grypocrinus
- †Gualtieria
- †Guettardicrinus
- †Guettaria
- †Guichenocarpos
- †Gustabilicrinus
- †Gutticrinus
- †Gymnocidaris
- †Gymnocrinus
- †Gymnodiadema
- †Gyrocystis

== H ==
- †Habanaster
- †Hadranderaster
- †Hadroblastus
- †Hadrochthus
- †Hadrocrinus
- †Hadrocystis
- †Hadrodiscus
- †Haereticotaxocrinus
- †Haeretocrinus
- †Hagenowia
- †Hagnocrinus
- †Haimea
- †Hallaster
- †Hallicystis
- †Hallocrinus
- †Halogetocrinus
- †Halysiocrinus
- †Hanusia
- †Hapalocrinus
- †Haplocrinites
- †Haplosphaeronis
- †Hardouinia
- †Harmostocrinus
- †Harrelicrinus
- †Harrellicrinus
- †Hattopsis
- †Haughtonaster
- †Hebeticrinus
- †Heckericystis
- †Helfriedella
- †Helianthaster
- †Heliaster
- †Helicocrinus
- †Helicocystis
- †Helicoplacus
- †Heliocidaris
- †Heliocrinites
- †Heliophora
- †Heliosocrinus
- †Helodiadema
- †Hemiaster
- †Hemibrachiocrinus
- †Hemicara
- †Hemicidaris
- †Hemicosmites
- †Hemicrinus
- †Hemicystites
- †Hemidiadema
- †Hemieurylae
- †Hemifaorina
- †Hemigymnia
- †Hemiindocrinus
- †Hemimollocrinus
- †Hemipedina
- †Hemipneustes
- †Hemisphaeranthos
- †Hemistreptacron
- †Hemistreptocrinus
- †Hemithylus
- †Hemitiaris
- †Henicocystis
- †Henricia
- †Heracrinus
- †Hercocrinus
- †Hernandezaster
- †Herpetocrinus
- †Herreraster
- †Hertha
- †Hesperaster
- †Hesperocystis
- †Hessotiara
- †Heteraster
- †Heteroblastus
- †Heterobrissus
- †Heterocentrotus
- †Heterocidaris
- †Heterocrinus
- †Heterocystites
- †Heterodiadema
- †Heterolampas
- †Heterometra
- †Heteropedina
- †Heterosalenia
- †Heteroschisma
- †Hexacrinites
- †Hexuraster
- †Hikelaster
- †Hillocystis
- †Himerocrinus
- †Himerometra
- †Hippasteria
- †Hippocystis
- †Hirneacrinus
- †Hirudocidaris
- †Hispidocrinus
- †Histocidaris
- †Histocrinus
- †Holaster
- †Holcocrinus
- †Holcopneustes
- †Holectypus
- †Hollowaycrinus
- †Holmeseocrinus
- †Holocrinus
- †Holocystites
- †Holopus
- †Holothuropsis
- †Holynocrinus
- †Homalocrinus
- †Homocrinus
- †Homocystites
- †Homoeaster
- †Homoeopetalus
- †Hoplocrinus
- †Hormocrinus
- †Hosieocrinus
- †Houiblastus
- †Hoyacrinus
- †Hudsonaster
- †Huniella
- †Hunsrueckaster
- †Hupea
- †Huttonechinus
- †Hyalocrinus
- †Hyattechinus
- †Hyboclypus
- †Hybocrinus
- †Hybocystites
- †Hydreionocrinus
- †Hydriocrinus
- †Hydroporocrinus
- †Hylodecrinus
- †Hypechinus
- †Hyperoblastus
- †Hypocrinus
- †Hypodiadema
- †Hypopygurus
- †Hyposalenia
- †Hypselocrinus
- †Hypsiclavus
- †Hypsocrinus
- †Hypsopatagus
- †Hypsopygaster
- †Hyrtanecrinus
- †Hysteraster
- †Hystrichopsydrax
- †Hystrigaster
- †Hystriyasterias

== I ==
- †Ibanocrinus
- †Iberocrinus
- †Ibexocrinus
- †Icthyocrinus
- †Idaeumocrinus
- †Idiocidaris
- †Idosocrinus
- †Iheringiella
- †Ilarionia
- †Illemnocrinus
- †Illusioluidia
- †Ilmocrinus
- †Imitatocrinus
- †Implicaticystis
- †Indiaster
- †Indoblastus
- †Indocrinus
- †Infraclypeus
- †Infulaster
- †Intermediacrinus
- †Inyocrinus
- †Iocrinus
- †Iowacystis
- †Iraniaster
- †Iranoblastus
- †Irenechinus
- †Isaster
- †Isechinus
- †Ismidaster
- †Isocatillocrinus
- †Isocrinus
- †Isomicraster
- †Isopetalum
- †Isopneustes
- †Isorophus
- †Isorophusella
- †Isotomocrinus
- †Isselicrinus
- †Iteacrinus
- †Ivanovaecrinus

== J ==
- †Jacksonaster
- †Jacquiertia
- †Jaekelicrinus
- †Jaekelocarpus
- †Jaekelocystis
- †Jaekelometra
- †Jahnocrinus
- †Jeannetia
- †Jeronia
- †Jimbacrinus
- †Jordanocaudina
- †Juglandocrinus
- †Junggaroblastus
- †Junocrinus

== K ==
- †Kadiskoblastus
- †Kallimorphocrinus
- †Kalpidocrinus
- †Kanabinocrinus
- †Kansacrinus
- †Karlaster
- †Katarocrinus
- †Katoblastus
- †Kazachstanoblastus
- †Kentrospondylus
- †Kephrenia
- †Kertaster
- †Kewia
- †Kierechinus
- †Kierocystis
- Kina
- †Kinzercystis
- †Klasmura
- †Kongielechinus
- †Koninckocidaris
- †Kooptoonocrinus
- †Kopficrinus
- †Kopficystis
- †Kophinocrinus
- †Kopriacrinus
- †Koryschisma
- †Kozurella
- †Krama
- †Krinocrinus
- †Kroppocrinus
- †Kuehnites
- †Kylixocrinus
- †Kyraster
- †Kyreocrinus

== L ==
- †Labiocrinus
- †Labrotaxis
- †Laccocrinus
- †Lacertasterias
- †Laevigatocrinus
- †Laevipatagus
- †Laganum
- †Lageniocrinus
- †Lagynocystis
- †Lajanaster
- †Lambertechinus
- †Lambertella
- †Lambertiaster
- †Lambertona
- †Lampadaster
- †Lampadocorys
- †Lampadosocrinus
- †Lampteroblastus
- †Lampterocrinus
- †Lanecrinus
- †Lanieria
- †Lanternarius
- †Lanternocrinus
- †Lanthanaster
- †Lapillocystites
- †Lapworthura
- †Lasanocrinus
- †Lasiocrinus
- †Laticlypus
- †Laubeocrinus
- †Laudonocrinus
- †Laurelocrinus
- †Lebetocrinus
- †Lebetodiscus
- †Lecanocrinus
- †Lecobasicrinus
- †Lecocrinus
- †Lecythiocrinus
- †Lecythocrinus
- †Ledidocidaris
- †Lefortia
- †Leiocyphus
- †Leioechinus
- †Leiopedina
- †Leiostomaster
- †Lekocrinus
- †Lemennocrinus
- †Lenicyamidia
- †Leniechinus
- †Lenita
- †Lenneocrinus
- †Lenticidaris
- †Leocrinus
- †Leodia
- †Lepadocystis
- †Lepidactis
- †Lepidaster
- †Lepidasterella
- †Lepidasterina
- †Lepidechinoides
- †Lepidechinus
- †Lepidesthes
- †Lepidocalix
- †Lepidocentrus
- †Lepidoconia
- †Lepidocystis
- †Lepidodiscus
- †Lepocrinites
- †Leptechinus
- †Leptocidaris
- †Leptocystis
- †Leptogonium
- †Leptopleurus
- †Leptosalenia
- †Leptoschisma
- †Lepyriactis
- †Leurocidaris
- †Levicidaris
- †Leviechinus
- †Lichenoides
- †Liliocrinus
- †Linckia
- †Lingulocystis
- †Linobrachiocrinus
- †Linocrinus
- †Linthia
- †Liomolgocrinus
- †Liparocrinus
- †Lipsanocystis
- †Lispidecodus
- †Lithocrinus
- †Litocrinus
- †Lobalocrinus
- †Lobomelocrinus
- †Logocrinus
- †Lonchocrinus
- †Lopadiocrinus
- †Lophaster
- †Lophidiaster
- †Lophoblastus
- †Lophocrinus
- †Loriolaster
- †Loriolella
- †Loriolia
- †Loriolicrinus
- †Loriolipedina
- †Loriolometra
- †Lotocrinus
- †Lovenechinus
- †Lovenia
- †Lovenicystis
- †Lovenilampas
- †Loxocrinus
- †Luhocrinus
- †Luidia
- †Lumectaster
- †Lutetiaster
- †Luxocrinus
- †Lyonicrinus
- †Lyricocarpus
- †Lyriocrinus
- †Lysocystites
- †Lytechinus

== M ==
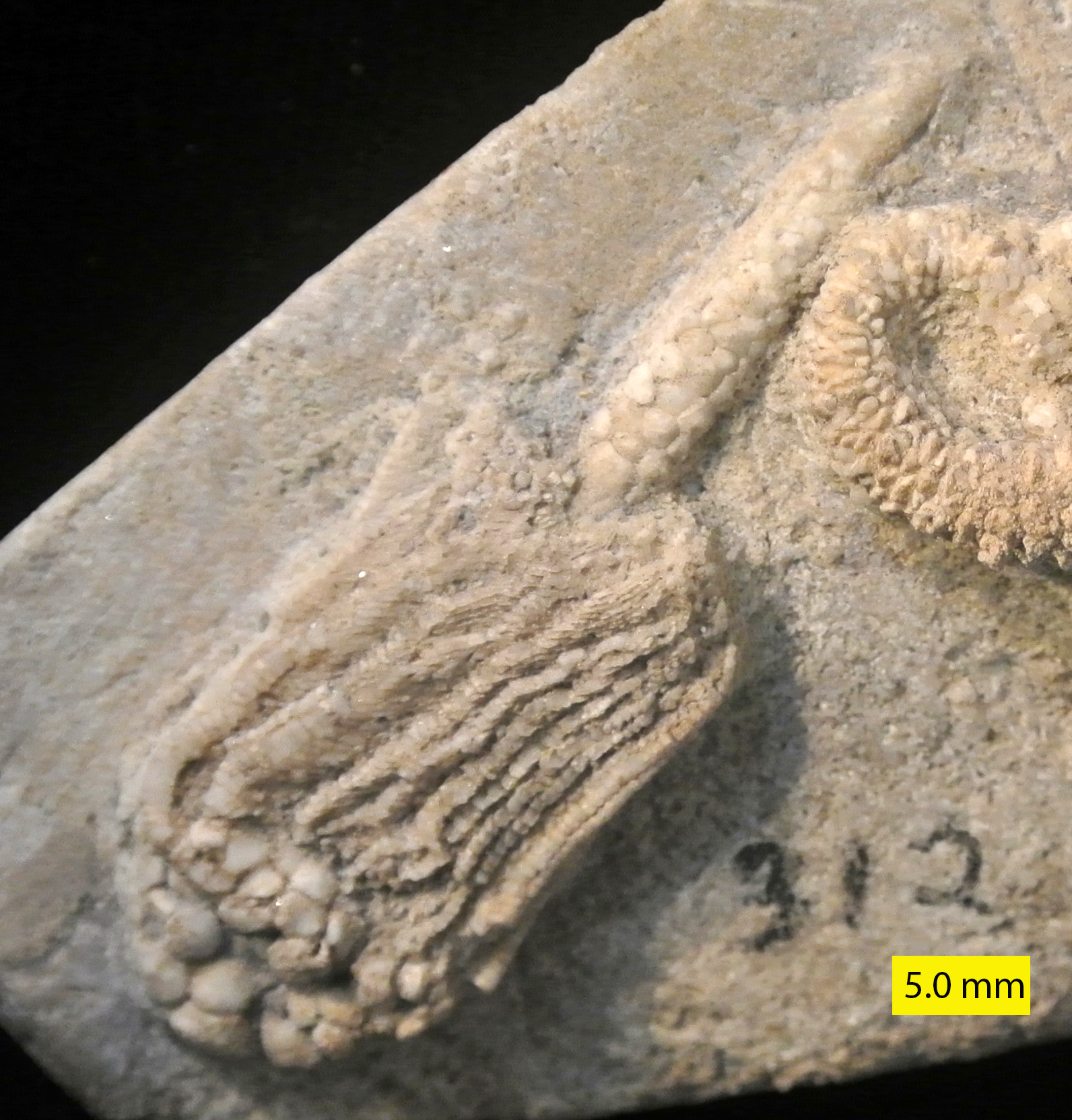
Macrocrinus verneuilianus (Shumard, 1855) from the Burlington Limestone (Lower Carboniferous) near Burlington, Iowa.

- †Macarocrinus
- †Maccoya
- †Macnamaratylus
- †Macraster
- †Macrocrinus
- †Macrocystella
- †Macrodiadema
- †Macropneustes
- †Macroporaster
- †Macrostylocrinus
- †Macurdablastus
- †Maennilicrinus
- †Magnosia
- †Malaiocrinus
- †Malchiblastus
- †Maligneocrinus
- †Malocystites
- †Mandelacrinus
- †Mandalacystis
- †Manicrinus
- †Manillacrinus
- †Manticrinus
- †Mantikosocrinus
- †Maquoketocrinus
- †Maragnicrinus
- †Marathonocrinus
- †Maretia
- †Marginaster
- †Marginura
- †Margocrinus
- †Marhoumacrinus
- †Mariania
- †Marjumicystis
- †Marsupiocrinus
- †Marsupites
- †Martinechinus
- †Mastaster
- †Mastigactis
- †Mastigocrinus
- †Mastigophiura
- †Mastoblastus
- †Mathericrinus
- †Mattsechinus
- †Mauritanaster
- †Mausoleaster
- †Mazzettia
- †Mediaster
- †Medocechinus
- †Medusaster
- †Meekechinus
- †Megacidaris
- †Megaliocrinus
- †Meganotocrinus
- †Megapetalus
- †Megapneustes
- †Megaporocidaris
- †Megistocrinus
- †Melbacrinus
- †Mellita
- †Mellitella
- †Melocrinites
- †Melonechinus
- †Menniscocrinus
- †Menocidaris
- †Menopygus
- †Menuthiaster
- †Meoma
- †Mepygurus
- †Mercedescaudina
- †Meristocrinus
- †Meristoschisma
- †Merocidaris
- †Merocrinus
- †Merriamaster
- †Mesoblastus
- †Mesocystis
- †Mesodiadema
- †Mesodiadema
- †Mesopalaeaster
- †Mesotremaster
- †Mespilocrinus
- †Mespilocystites
- †Messaoudia
- †Metablastus
- †Metabolocrinus
- †Metacalceolispongia
- †Metacatillocrinus
- †Metacrinus
- †Metacrocrinus
- †Metacromyocrinus
- †Metaeutelecrinus
- †Metaffinocrinus
- †Metaindocrinus
- †Metalia
- †Metallagecrinus
- †Metaperimestocrinus
- †Metaporinus
- †Metasterocystis
- †Metasycocrinus
- †Methabocrinus
- †Metholectypus
- †Metichthyocrinus
- †Metopaster
- †Metutharocrinus
- †Miatschkovocrinus
- †Micradites
- †Micraster
- †Microantyx
- †Microblastus
- †Microcaracrinus
- †Microcrinus
- †Microcyphus
- †Microdiadema
- †Microlampas
- †Micropedina
- †Micropsis
- †Mictocrinus
- †Migliorinia
- †Mikrocidarió
- †Millericrinus
- †Milonicystis
- †Mimocystites
- †Minervaecystis
- †Minicidaris
- †Minicrinus
- †Minilyacrinus
- †Miocidaris
- †Miopentagonaster
- †Miospondylus
- †Miracrinus
- †Mirechinus
- †Mistia
- †Mitrocrinus
- †Mitrocystella
- †Mitrocystites
- †Moapocrinus
- †Moenocrinus
- †Moira
- †Moiropsis
- †Mokotibaster
- †Mollocrinus
- †Monachocrinus
- †Monadoblastus
- †Monaldicrinus
- †Monaster
- †Mongolocarpos
- †Moniellocrinus
- †Monilipsolus
- †Monoblastus
- †Monobrachiocrinus
- †Monocycloides
- †Monodiadema
- †Monophoraster
- †Monoschizablastus
- †Monostychia
- †Monstrocrinus
- †Montanablastus
- †Mooreocrinus
- †Moronaster
- †Morrowcrinus
- †Mortensenaster
- †Mortensenites
- †Mortonella
- †Moscovicrinus
- †Moundocrinus
- †Mundaster
- †Murravechinus
- †Musicrinus
- †Mycocrinus
- †Myeinocystites
- †Myelodactylus
- †Myriastiches
- †Myrtillocrinus
- †Mysticocrinus

== N ==
- †Nacocrinus
- †Nactocrinus
- †Nanicrinus
- †Nannoblastus
- †Nanocarpus
- †Nanocrinus
- †Narindechinus
- †Nassoviocrinus
- †Nasutocrinus
- †Nebrashacrinus
- †Necopinocrinus
- †Neerkolocrinus
- †Nehalemia
- †Nemaster
- †Neoarchaeocrinus
- †Neobothriocidaris
- †Neocamptocrinus
- †Neocatacrinus
- †Neocatillocrinus
- †Neocatopygus
- †Neocrinus
- †Neodadocrinus
- †Neodichocrinus
- †Neoglobator
- †Neoisorophusella
- †Neolaganum
- †Neolageniocrinus
- †Neopalaeaster
- †Neoplatycrinus
- †Neoproraster
- †Neoprotencrinus
- †Neorumphia
- †Neoschisma
- †Neozeacrinus
- †Nereocrinus
- †Nevadacrinus
- †Nevadaecystis
- †Nevadocrinus
- †Nexocrinus
- †Nielsenicrinus
- †Ninocrinus
- †Nipponaster
- †Nipponaster
- †Nipterocrinus
- †Nodoblastus
- †Noetlingaster
- †Nolichuckia
- †Nonparactocrinus
- †Nordenskjoeldaster
- †Nortonechinus
- †Notiocatillocrinus
- †Notiocrinus
- †Notoblastus
- †Notocarpos
- †Notocidaris
- †Notocrinus
- †Notolampas
- †Noviaster
- †Nowracrinus
- †Nucleocrinus
- †Nucleolites
- †Nucleopygus
- †Nudechinus
- †Nudobrissus
- †Nullamphiura
- †Nummicrinus
- †Nunnacrinus
- †Nuxocrinus
- †Nyctocrinus
- †Nymphaeoblastus
- †Nymphaster

== O ==
- †Occiducrinus
- †Occultocystis
- †Ochetes
- †Oedematocidaris
- †Oehlerticrinus
- †Oenochoacrinus
- †Offaster
- †Ohiocrinus
- †Oklahomacrinus
- †Oklahomacystis
- †Oligobrachyocrinus
- †Oligophyma
- †Oligoporus
- †Oligopygus
- †Oneirophanites
- †Ontariocrinus
- †Onychaster
- †Onychocrinus
- †Oocystis
- †Oolopygus
- †Opechinus
- †Ophiacantha
- †Ophiaulax
- †Ophiocnida
- †Ophiocoma
- †Ophiocrinus
- †Ophiocrossota
- †Ophiocten
- †Ophioglyphoida
- †Ophiolancea
- †Ophiomusium
- †Ophiopetra
- †Ophiopinna
- †Ophiothrix
- †Ophiotitanos
- †Ophiotrigonum
- †Ophioxenikos
- †Ophiura
- †Ophiurella
- †Ophiurina
- †Ophiuriocoma
- †Ophiurocrinus
- †Ophryaster
- †Opisopneustes
- †Opissaster
- †Opsiocrinus
- †Orbiblastus
- †Orbignyana
- †Orbignycrinus
- †Orbitremites
- †Ornaticannula
- †Ornithaster
- †Orocystites
- †Orophocrinus
- †Orthaster
- †Orthocidaris
- †Orthocrinus
- †Orthogonocrinus
- †Orthopsis
- †Osculocystis
- †Ossicrinus
- †Osteocrinus
- †Othneiocrinus
- †Ottawacrinus
- †Oustechnius
- †Oviclypeus
- †Ovocarpus
- †Ovulaster
- †Ovulechinus
- †Ovulocystites
- †Oxynocrinus

== P ==
- †Pabianocrinus
- †Pachopsites
- †Pachyblastus
- †Pachycalix
- †Pachycidaris
- †Pachylocrinus
- †Pachyocrinus
- †Pagecrinus
- †Paianocrinus
- †Paiderocrinus
- †Palaeantedon
- †Palaeaster
- †Palaechinus
- †Palaeocoma
- †Palaeocomaster
- †Palaeocrinus
- †Palaeocucumaria
- †Palaeocystites
- †Palaeodiadema
- †Palaeodiscus
- †Palaeoholopus
- †Palaeopedina
- †Palaeophiura
- †Palaeosolaster
- †Palaeostella
- †Palaeostoma
- †Palaeoypsilus
- †Palaeura
- †Palasterina
- †Palasteriscus
- †Palelpidia
- †Paleochiridota
- †Paleoctenodiscus
- †Paleopneustes
- †Paleosphaeronites
- †Palhemiaster
- †Palmeraster
- †Palmerius
- †Palmerocrinus
- †Pandanocrinus
- †Pandoracrinus
- †Parabotryocrinus
- †Parabrissus
- †Parabursacrinus
- †Paracatillocrinus
- †Paracidaris
- †Paraclidochirus
- †Paracodaster
- †Paracolocrinus
- †Paracomatula
- †Paracosmetocrinus
- †Paracotylederma
- †Paracremacrinus
- †Paracrocrinus
- †Paracromyocrinus
- †Paractocrinus
- †Paracucumarites
- †Paracydonocrinus
- †Paracymbiocrinus
- †Paracystis
- †Paradelocrinus
- †Paradiabolocrinus
- †Paradichocrinus
- †Paradoxechinus
- †Paradoxocrinus
- †Paragammarocrinites
- †Paragaricocrinus
- †Paragassizocrinus
- †Paragazacrinus
- †Paragogia
- †Paragonaster
- †Paragraphiocrinus
- †Paraheteraster
- †Parahexacrinus
- †Paramegaliocrinus
- †Paramelocrinus
- †Paramphicrinus
- †Paranacystis
- †Paranisocrinus
- †Parapernerocrinus
- †Parapisocrinus
- †Paraplasocrinus
- †Parapygus
- †Pararchaeocrinus
- †Parasalenia
- †Parascutella
- †Parascytalocrinus
- †Parastachyocrinus
- †Parastephanocrinus
- †Paraster
- †Parasycocrinus
- †Paratalarocrinus
- †Paratimorocidaris
- †Parazeacrinites
- †Parazophocrinus
- †Paredriophus
- †Pareocrinus
- †Parethelocrinus
- †Parhabdocidaris
- †Parichthyocrinus
- †Parindocrinus
- †Pariocrinus
- †Parisangulocrinus
- †Parisocrinus
- †Parmulechinus
- †Paronaster
- †Parorthocrinus
- †Parspaniocrinus
- †Parulocrinus
- †Parvicidaris
- †Parvioctoidus
- †Parvispina
- †Passalocrinus
- †Patelliocrinus
- †Paulocrinus
- †Paurocidaris
- †Pedatopriscus
- †Pedina
- †Pedinocrinus
- †Pedinopsis
- †Pedinothuria
- †Pegaster
- †Pegocrinus
- †Pelanechinus
- †Pelanodiadema
- †Pelecocrinus
- †Pelidocrinus
- †Pellecrinus
- †Peltacrinus
- †Peltocystis
- †Pemphocystis
- †Penicillicrinus
- †Peniculocrinus
- †Pentablastus
- †Pentacrinites
- †Pentaramicrinus
- †Pentasteria
- †Pentececrinus
- †Pentechinus
- †Pentedium
- †Pentephyllum
- †Pentremites
- †Pentremitidea
- †Pentremoblastus
- †Pepitaxoncrinus
- †Peraspatangus
- †Percevalicrinus
- †Peremocrinus
- †Periarchus
- †Periaster
- †Peribrissus
- †Pericosmus
- †Peridionites
- †Periechocrinus
- †Periglyptocrinus
- †Perimestocrinus
- †Perischocidaris
- †Perischodomus
- †Perissocrinus
- †Perittoblastus
- †Permaster
- †Permiocrinus
- †Permobrachypus
- †Pernerocrinus
- †Peronella
- †Peronellites
- †Perritocrinus
- †Perunocrinus
- †Petalambicrinus
- †Petaloblastus
- †Petalobrissus
- †Petalocrinus
- †Petalocystites
- †Petraster
- †Petrocrinus
- †Petropegia
- †Petschoracrinus
- †Phacelocrinus
- †Phaenoblastus
- †Phaenoschisma
- †Phalacrocidaris
- †Phalacropedina
- †Phanocrinus
- †Pharaonaster
- †Phillipaster
- †Phillipsocrinus
- †Phimocrinus
- †Phlyctocystis
- †Phocidaster
- †Pholidechinus
- †Pholidocidaris
- †Phragmactis
- †Phrygilocrinus
- †Phyllacanthus
- †Phyllobrissus
- †Phyllocrinus
- †Phyllocystis
- †Phymechinus
- †Phymopedina
- †Phymosoma
- †Phymotaxis
- †Physaster
- †Physetocrinus
- †Pictaviechinus
- †Pidelocrinus
- †Pileus
- †Pilidiocrinus
- †Pilocrinus
- †Pilocystites
- †Pimlicocrinus
- †Pirasocrinus
- †Pirocystella
- †Pisocrinus
- †Pisolampas
- †Pithocrinus
- †Placoblastus
- †Placocystella
- †Placocystites
- †Placometra
- †Plagiobrissus
- †Plagiochasma
- †Plagiocrinus
- †Planacrocrinus
- †Platanaster
- †Platipygus
- †Platyacrocrinus
- †Platybrissus
- †Platycrinites
- †Platycystites
- †Platyfundocrinus
- †Platyhexacrinus
- †Plaxocrinus
- †Playfordicrinus
- †Plegiocidaris
- †Pleiechinus
- †Pleiocyphus
- †Plemnocrinus
- †Plesiaster
- †Plesiastropecten
- †Plesioastropecten
- †Plesiocidaris
- †Plesiocrinus
- †Plesiolampas
- †Plesiopatagus
- †Plethoschisma
- †Pleurocrinus
- †Pleurocystites
- †Pleurodiadema
- †Pleuroschisma
- †Plicatocrinus
- †Plicodendrocrinus
- †Pliolampas
- †Plococidaris
- †Plotocrinus
- †Plumaster
- †Plummericrinus
- †Poculicrinus
- †Poecilocrinus
- †Pogonipocrinus
- †Polusocrinus
- †Polycidaris
- †Polycosmites
- †Polycrinus
- †Polycyphus
- †Polydeltoideus
- †Polydesmaster
- †Polydiadema
- †Polygonocrinus
- †Polypeltes
- †Polyplacida
- †Polyplacus
- †Polyptychella
- †Polysalenia
- †Polytaxicidaris
- †Polytryphocycloides
- †Pomaster
- †Pomatocrinus
- †Porachistrum
- †Porechinus
- †Poriocidaris
- †Poroblastus
- †Porocidaris
- †Porocrinus
- †Poropeltaris
- †Porosoma
- †Porphyrocrinus
- †Porpitella
- †Postibulla
- †Poteriocrinites
- †Pourtalesia
- †Pradesura
- †Pradocrinus
- †Praecaudina
- †Praecupulocrinus
- †Praedicticrinus
- †Praeeuphronides
- †Praeisselicrinus
- †Praeorocrinus
- †Praepleurocystis
- †Pregazacrinus
- †Premanicrinus
- †Prenaster
- †Prininocrinus
- †Printechinus
- †Prionechinus
- †Prionocidaris
- †Priscoligula
- †Priscolongatus
- †Priscopedatoides
- †Priscopedatus
- †Priscularites
- †Proallosocrinus
- †Proampelocrinus
- †Proanisocrinus
- †Proapsidocrinus
- †Probletocrinus
- †Prochauvelicystis
- †Prochoidiocrinus
- †Procidaris
- †Procomaster
- †Procothurnocystis
- †Proctothylacocrinus
- †Proescutella
- †Proexenocrinus
- †Progalliaecystis
- †Progonechinus
- †Prohexacrinus
- †Proholaster
- †Proholopus
- †Proholothuria
- †Proindocrinus
- †Prokopicrinus
- †Prokopicystis
- †Prolobocrinus
- †Promelocrinus
- †Promopalaeaster
- †Pronechinus
- †Prophyllacanthus
- †Prophyllocrinus
- †Propoteriocrinus
- †Proraster
- †Prosostoma
- †Protacrocrinus
- †Protarthraster
- †Protaster
- †Protaxocrinus
- †Protenaster
- †Protencrinus
- †Proterocidaris
- †Proterocystites
- †Protheelia
- †Protobrissus
- †Protocaudina
- †Protocidaris
- †Protocrinites
- †Protocystis
- †Protocystites
- †Protocytidium
- †Protolampas
- †Protopalaeaster
- †Protoscutella
- †Protothyraster
- †Protremaster
- †Prowillungaster
- †Prunocystites
- †Psalidocrinus
- †Psammechinus
- †Psephechinus
- †Psephoaster
- †Pseudananchys
- †Pseudarbacia
- †Pseudarbacina
- †Pseudarchaster
- †Pseudaristocystis
- †Pseudechinus
- †Pseudholaster
- †Pseudoantedon
- †Pseudobrissus
- †Pseudocentrotus
- †Pseudocidaris
- †Pseudocrinites
- †Pseudodiadema
- †Pseudodicoptella
- †Pseudoexlinella
- †Pseudoffaster
- †Pseudogibbaster
- †Pseudolinthia
- †Pseudopedina
- †Pseudopygaulus
- †Pseudopygurus
- †Pseudorthopsis
- †Pseudosaccocoma
- †Pseudosalenia
- †Pseudosorella
- †Pseudostaurocumites
- †Pseudovictoriacystis
- †Pseudowashitaster
- †Psilocrinus
- †Pskovicrinus
- †Pterinocrinus
- †Pterocoma
- †Pterotoblastus
- †Pterotocrinus
- †Ptilonaster
- †Ptychoblastus
- †Ptychocosmites
- †Ptychocrinus
- †Pulaskicrinus
- †Pumilindocrinus
- †Punctatites
- †Pusillaster
- †Putilovocrinus
- †Pycinaster
- †Pycnocrinus
- †Pycnosaccus
- †Pygaster
- †Pygaulus
- †Pygecystis
- †Pygidiolampas
- †Pygmaeocrinus
- †Pygomalus
- †Pygopistes
- †Pygopyrina
- †Pygorhynchus
- †Pygorhytis
- †Pygospatangus
- †Pygurostoma
- †Pygurus
- †Pyndaxocrinus
- †Pyramiblastus
- †Pyrenocrinus
- †Pyrgocystis
- †Pyrina
- †Pyrocystites
- †Pyxidocrinus

== Q ==
- †Quantoxocrinus
- †Quenstedticrinus
- †Quiniocrinus
- †Quinquecaudex

== R ==
- †Rachiosoma
- †Radiobrissus
- †Radiocyphus
- †Radiolus
- †Ramacrinus
- †Ramseyocrinus
- †Ramulocrinus
- †Ramusites
- †Rasfacrinus
- †Raymondicrinus
- †Recrosalenia
- †Rectitriordo
- †Recurvaster
- †Regnellicrinus
- †Regnellicystis
- †Regulaecystis
- †Remesimetra
- †Remisovicrinus
- †Remondella
- †Resetocrinus
- †Reteocrinus
- †Reticulocarpos
- †Retusocrinus
- †Revalocrinus
- †Revalocystis
- †Rhabdocidaris
- †Rhabdocrinus
- †Rhabdotites
- †Rhachkicrinus
- †Rhadinocrinus
- †Rhaphaocrinus
- †Rhenaster
- †Rhenechinus
- †Rhenocrinus
- †Rhenocystis
- †Rhenopyrgus
- †Rheocrinus
- †Rhipidocrinus
- †Rhipidocystis
- †Rhodanometra
- †Rhodocrinites
- †Rhopaloblastus
- †Rhopalocoma
- †Rhopalocrinus
- †Rhopalocystis
- †Rhopocrinus
- †Rhopostoma
- †Rhyncholampas
- †Rhynchopygus
- †Rhynobrissus
- †Ridersia
- †Rigaudites
- †Rimosidocrinus
- †Rispolia
- †Ristnacrinus
- †Roemerocrinus
- †Roiometra
- †Rojasia
- †Rota
- †Rotasaccus
- †Rotula
- †Rotuloidea
- †Roveacrinoides
- †Roveacrinus
- †Royasendia
- †Rumphia
- †Rumphiocrinus
- †Runa
- †Rutroclypeus

== S ==
- †Sacariacrinus
- †Saccocoma
- †Saccosompsis
- †Sacrinus
- †Sagenocrinites
- †Sagittoblastus
- †Salenia
- †Salenidia
- †Salmacis
- †Salteraster
- †Samlandaster
- †Sampsonocrinus
- †Sanchezaster
- †Sanchezella
- †Santeelampas
- †Sardinocrinus
- †Sardocidaris
- †Sarocrinus
- †Savagella
- †Savainiaster
- †Scagliaster
- †Scalenocystites
- †Scammatocrinus
- †Scaphechinus
- †Scaptodiadema
- †Schedexocrinus
- †Schistocrinus
- †Schizaster
- †Schizechinus
- †Schizoblastus
- †Schizocrinus
- †Schizocystis
- †Schizopneustes
- †Schizotremites
- †Schlueterometra
- †Schlumbergerites
- †Schmidtocrinus
- †Schoenaster
- †Schondorfia
- †Schuchertia
- †Schuchertocystis
- †Schultzicrinus
- †Sciadiocrinus
- †Sclerasterias
- †Sclerocrinus
- †Sclerothupites
- †Scolechinus
- †Scoliechinus
- †Scoliocrinus
- †Scoliocystis
- †Scotiacrinus
- †Scotiaecystis
- †Scotocrinus
- †Scutaster
- †Scutella
- †Scutellaster
- †Scutellina
- †Scutellinoides
- †Scutulum
- †Scyphocrinites
- †Scytalocrinus
- †Seirocrinus
- †Sellardsicrinus
- †Semiometra
- †Semipetalion
- †Semperites
- †Senariocrinus
- †Separocrinus
- †Serendipocrinus
- †Serpianotiaris
- †Seunaster
- †Shidianocrinus
- †Shimantocrinus
- †Shintocrinus
- †Shroshaecrinus
- †Siderocrinus
- †Sievertsia
- †Sievertsia
- †Sigambrocrinus
- †Silesiaster
- †Silfonocrinus
- †Siliesiacrinus
- †Siluraster
- †Silurocidaris
- †Simocrinus
- †Simplococrinus
- †Sinaecidaris
- †Sinclairocystis
- †Singularocrinus
- †Sinocrinus
- †Sinocystis
- †Sinoeocrinus
- †Sinopetaloblastus
- †Sinopetalocrinus
- †Sinosura
- †Siphonocrinus
- †Sismondia
- †Situlacrinus
- †Skaiocrinus
- †Sladenia
- †Solanocrinites
- †Solaster
- †Sollasina
- †Solonaerium
- †Solopedatus
- †Somalechinus
- †Somaliaster
- †Somphocrinus
- †Sostronocrinus
- †Souticrinus
- †Spandelites
- †Spaniaster
- †Spaniocrinus
- †Spaniocyphus
- †Spatagoides
- †Spatangomorpha
- †Spatangus
- †Spenceraster
- †Spenceria
- †Spermacystis
- †Sphaerechinus
- †Sphaeriaster
- †Sphaeriodiscus
- †Sphaerocrinus
- †Sphaerocystites
- †Sphaeronites
- †Sphaeroschisma
- †Sphaerotiaris
- †Sphaerotocrinus
- †Sphagoblastus
- †Spheniscocrinus
- †Spinopriscopedatus
- †Spiraclavus
- †Springeracrocrinus
- †Springericrinus
- †Springerocystis
- †Spriocrinus
- †Spyridiocrinus
- †Stachyocrinus
- †Stamnocrinus
- †Staphylocrinus
- †Stauranderaster
- †Staurocumites
- †Staurocystis
- †Steganocrinus
- †Stegaster
- †Stegopygus
- †Stelidiocrinus
- †Stellarocrinus
- †Stenaster
- †Stenechinus
- †Stenoaster
- †Stenometra
- †Stenopecrinus
- †Stephanoblastus
- †Stephanocrinus
- †Stephanoura
- †Stereoaster
- †Stereobrachicrinus
- †Stereocidaris
- †Sternotaxis
- †Stewbrecrinus
- †Stibaraster
- †Stibarocrinus
- †Stichocystis
- †Stichopitella
- †Stichopites
- †Stigmatopygus
- †Stinocrinus
- †Stipatocrinus
- †Stiptocrinus
- †Stirechinus
- †Stiremetra
- †Stomaporus
- †Stomechinus
- †Stomiocrinus
- †Stomopneutes
- †Storthingocrinus
- †Strambergocrinus
- †Streblocrinus
- †Streptaster
- †Streptocrinus
- †Stribalocystites
- †Strimplecrinus
- †Strobilocystites
- †Strobilothyone
- †Strobocrinus
- †Stromatocystites
- †Strongyloblastus
- †Strongylocentrotus
- †Strongylocrinus
- †Strotocrinus
- †Struszocrinus
- †Stuartwellercrinus
- †Studeria
- †Stueria
- †Stuertzaster
- †Stuertzura
- †Stylocidaris
- †Stylocrinus
- †Styracocrinus
- †Subarrectocrinus
- †Sublobalocrinus
- †Sucia
- †Sundacrinus
- †Sunwaptacrinus
- †Sycocrinites
- †Sygcaulocrinus
- †Synaptites
- †Synaptocrinus
- †Synarmocrinus
- †Synbathocrinus
- †Synchirocrinus
- †Syndetocrinus
- †Synerocrinus
- †Syntomocrinus
- †Syntomospina
- †Synyphocrinus
- †Syringocrinus

== T ==
- †Taeniactis
- †Taeniaster
- †Tagenocrinus
- †Taidocrinus
- †Taimanawa
- †Talarocrinus
- †Tanablastus
- †Tanaocystis
- †Taphraster
- †Tapinocrinus
- †Tarachiocrinus
- †Tarantocrinus
- †Tarphypygus
- †Tasmanicytidium
- †Tasmanocrinus
- †Tatechinus
- †Tatonkacystis
- †Taucatillocrinus
- †Taurocrinus
- †Taxocrinus
- †Technocrinus
- †Teichaster
- †Teleiocrinus
- †Telikosocrinus
- †Teliocrinus
- †Temnechinus
- †Temnocidaris
- †Temnocrinus
- †Temnopleurus
- †Temnotrema
- †Tenagocrinus
- †Tenuirachnius
- †Termieria
- †Terminaster
- †Terocrinus
- †Terpnocrinus
- †Tesselaster
- †Tessieria
- †Testudinaster
- †Tethyaster
- †Tetrabrachiocrinus
- †Tetracidaris
- †Tetracionocrinus
- †Tetracrinus
- †Tetractocrinus
- †Tetractocrinus
- †Tetracystis
- †Tetragonocrinus
- †Tetragramma
- †Tetramerocrinites
- †Tetrapleurocrinus
- †Tetraramania
- †Tetravirga
- †Texacrinus
- †Thagastea
- †Thalamocrinus
- †Thallatocanthus
- †Thallocrinus
- †Thaminocrinus
- †Thamnocrinus
- †Thaumatoblastus
- †Theelia
- †Theleproktocrinus
- †Theloreus
- †Thenarocrinus
- †Thetidicrinus
- †Thierychinus
- †Thiolliericrinus
- †Tholaster
- †Tholocrinus
- †Tholocystis
- †Thomacystis
- †Thomasocrinus
- †Thoralicystis
- †Thresherodiscus
- †Thuringocrinus
- †Thylacocrinus
- †Thylechinus
- †Thyridocrinus
- †Tiaracrinus
- †Tiarechinopsis
- †Tiarechinus
- †Tiaridia
- †Tiaromma
- †Timeischytes
- †Timorechinus
- †Timoroblastus
- †Tirocrinus
- †Titanaster
- †Tithonia
- †Togocyamus
- †Tormoblastus
- †Tornatilicrinus
- †Tornquistellus
- †Torrocrinus
- †Torynocrinus
- †Totiglobus
- †Tournoueraster
- †Toxaster
- †Toxopatagus
- †Toxopneustes
- †Trachelocrinus
- †Trachypatagus
- †Trampidocrinus
- †Traskocrinus
- †Traumatocrinus
- †Trautscholdicrinus
- †Tremataster
- †Trematocystis
- †Treocrinus
- †Tretocidaris
- †Triacrinus
- †Triadechinus
- †Triadocidaris
- †Triassicidaris
- †Triboloporus
- †Tribrachyocrinus
- †Triceracrinus
- †Trichasteropsis
- †Trichinocrinus
- †Trichocrinus
- †Trichotocrinus
- †Tricoelocrinus
- †Tricosmites
- †Trimeraster
- †Trimerocrinus
- †Trinalicrinus
- †Tripatocrinus
- †Triplacidia
- †Tripneustes
- †Tripylus
- †Triradites
- †Trisalenia
- †Trochalosoma
- †Trochocrinites
- †Trochocrinites
- †Trochocystites
- †Trochocystoides
- †Trochodiadema
- †Trochoechinus
- †Trochotiara
- †Troosticrinus
- †Trophocrinus
- †Tropidaster
- †Trybliocrinus
- †Trypherocrinus
- †Tryssocrinus
- †Tulipacrinus
- †Tundracrinus
- †Tunguskocrinus
- †Tunisiacrinus
- †Turanglaster
- †Turbocrinus
- †Tylasteria
- †Tylocidaris
- †Tympanoblastus
- †Typanocrinus
- †Tyrieocrinus
- †Tyrolecrinus
- †Tyrridiocystis

== U ==
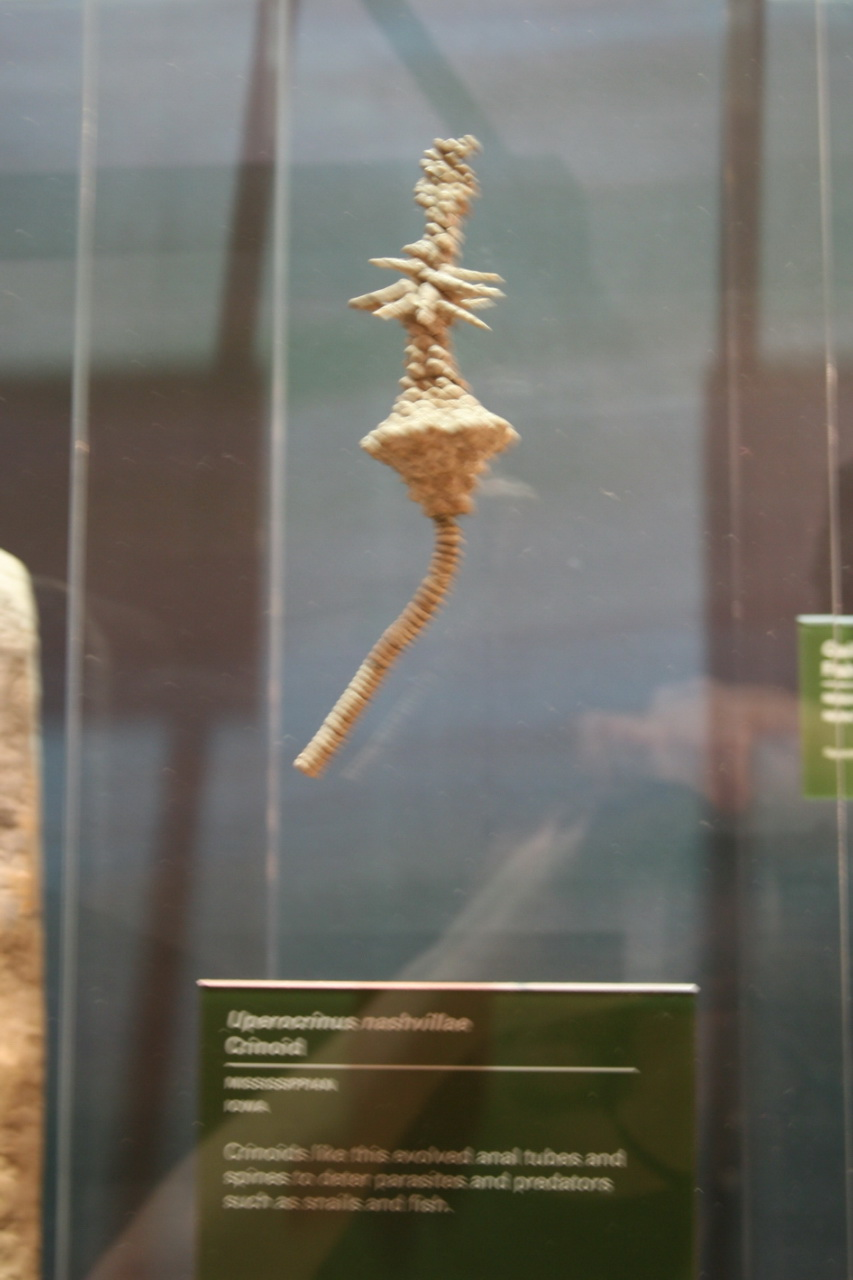
Uperocrinus nashvillae

- †Uintacrinus
- †Ulocrinus
- †Ulrichaster
- †Ulrichicrinus
- †Ulrichidiscus
- †Ulrichocystis
- †Umbocrinus
- †Uncinulina
- †Uncinuloides
- †Unibothriocidaris
- †Unifascia
- †Uniramosa
- †Uperocrinus
- †Urasterella
- †Ureocrinus
- †Urosoma
- †Utharocrinus
- †Uyguroblastus

== V ==
- †Vadarocrinus
- †Valettaster
- †Valsalenia
- †Vandelcoaster
- †Vaquerosella
- †Vasocrinus
- †Verbeekia
- †Vernius
- †Vertigocrinus
- †Vicetiametra
- †Victoriacystis
- †Victoriaster
- †Villebrunaster
- †Vinchuscanchaia
- †Virucrinus
- †Vizcainocarpus
- †Volchovia
- †Vologesia
- †Vomeraster
- †Vosekocrinus
- †Vostocovacrinus

== W ==
- †Wachsmuthicrinus
- †Walcottidiscus
- †Wacrinus
- †Wannerocrinus
- †Washitaster
- †Weisbordella
- †Wellerocystis
- †Westgardella
- †Westheadocrinus
- †Wetherbyocrinus
- †Whiteocrinus
- †Willmanocystis
- †Willungaster
- †Wilsonicrinus
- †Winkleria
- †Woodocrinus
- †Worthenocrinus
- †Wrightia
- †Wrightocrinus
- †Wuarnia
- †Wythella

== X ==
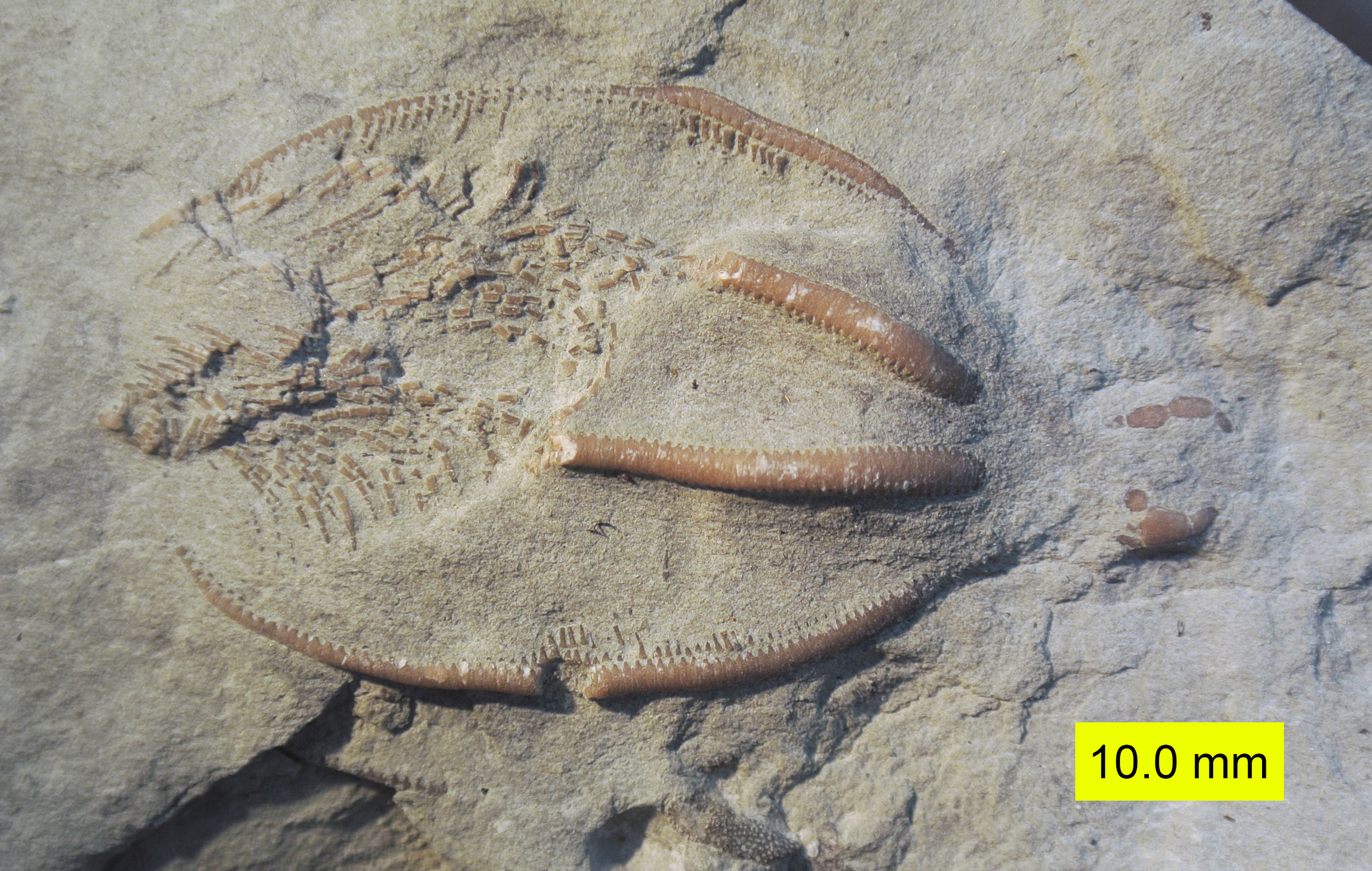
Xenocrinus baeri (Meek, 1872); Upper Ordovician crinoid calyx from the Bull Fork Formation, Caesar Creek, Ohio.

- †Xandarosaster
- †Xanthamphiura
- †Xenaster
- †Xenechinus
- †Xenoblastus
- †Xenocatillocrinus
- †Xenocidaris
- †Xenocrinus
- †Xenocystites
- †Xinjiangoblastus
- †Xisoallogecrinus
- †Xyeleblastus
- †Xysmacrinus
- †Xysteria

== Y ==
- †Yachalicystis
- †Yakovlevicrinus
- †Yanjiahella
- †Yarravaster

== Z ==
- †Zardinechinus
- †Zeacrinites
- †Zenkericrinus
- †Zenocentrotus
- †Zenocrinus
- †Zeuglopleurus
- †Zeugopleurus
- †Zeusocrinus
- †Zirocrinus
- †Zophocrinus
- Zoroaster
- †Zostocrinus
- †Zuffardia
- †Zumoffenia
- †Zygocycloides
- †Zygotocrinus

== See also ==
- Echinoderms
- Crinoids
