= List of prehistoric sea cucumbers =

This list of prehistoric sea cucumbers is an attempt to create a comprehensive listing of all genera from the fossil record that have ever been considered to be holothuroidea, excluding purely vernacular terms. The list includes all commonly accepted genera, but also genera that are now considered invalid, doubtful (nomina dubia), or were not formally published (nomina nuda), as well as junior synonyms of more established names, and genera that are no longer considered sea cucumbers.

== Naming conventions and terminology ==
Naming conventions and terminology follow the International Code of Zoological Nomenclature(ICZN). Technical terms used include:

- Junior synonym: A name which describes the same taxon as a previously published name. If two or more genera are formally designated and the type specimens are later assigned to the same genus, the first to be published (in chronological order) is the senior synonym, and all other instances are junior synonyms. Senior synonyms are generally used, except by special decision of the ICZN, but junior synonyms cannot be used again, even if deprecated. Junior synonymy is often subjective, unless the genera described were both based on the same type specimen.
- Nomen nudum (Latin for "naked name"): A name that has appeared in print but has not yet been formally published by the standards of the ICZN. Nomina nuda (the plural form) are invalid, and are therefore not italicized as a proper generic name would be. If the name is later formally published, that name is no longer a nomen nudum and will be italicized on this list. Often, the formally published name will differ from any nomina nuda that describe the same specimen.
- Nomen oblitum (Latin for "forgotten name"): A name that has not been used in the scientific community for more than fifty years after its original proposal.
- Preoccupied name: A name that is formally published, but which has already been used for another taxon. This second use is invalid (as are all subsequent uses) and the name must be replaced. As preoccupied names are not valid generic names, they will also go unitalicized on this list.
- Nomen dubium (Latin for "dubious name"): A name describing a fossil with no unique diagnostic features. As this can be an extremely subjective and controversial designation, this term is not used on this list.

== The list ==
Genus	Authors	Year	Status	Age	Location	Notes
Acanthotheelia						
Acanthocaudina						
Achistrum						
Acutisclerus						
Aduncrum						
Alexandrites						
Amphitriodites						
Andenothyone						
Auricularites						
Bathysynactites						
Binoculites						
Calcancora						
Calcancorella						
Calcancoroidea						
Calclamna						
Calclamnella						
Calclamnoidea						
Calcligula						
Calclyra						
Clavallus						
Collbatothuria						
Conisia						
Cosmatites						
Costigerites						
Croneisites						
Crucivirga						
Cucumarites						
Curvatella						
Dictyothurites						
Elgerius						
Eocaudina						
Etheridgella						
Exlinella						
Fissobractites						
Frizzellus						
Helfriedella						
Hemisphaeranthos						
Holothuropsis						
Huniella						
Jordanocaudina						
Kozurella						
Kuehnites						
Mercedescaudina						
Micradites						
Microantyx						
Monilipsolus						
Mortensenites						
Oneirophanites						
Ornaticannula						
Pachopsites						
Palaeocucumaria						
Palaeoypsilus						
Palelpidia						
Paleochiridota						
Paracucumarites						
Parvioctoidus						
Parvispina						
Pedatopriscus						
Petropegia						
Porachistrum						
Porosothyone						
Praecaudina						
Praeeuphronides						
Priscoligula						
Priscolongatus						
Priscopedatoides						
Priscopedatus						
Priscularites						
Proholothuria						
Protheelia						
Protocaudina						
Pseudoexlinella						
Pseudostaurocumites						
Punctatites						
Ramusites						
Rhabdotites						
Rigaudites						
Rota						
Schlumbergerites						
Sclerothupites						
Semperites						
Solopedatus						
Spandelites						
Spinopriscopedatus						
Staurocumites						
Stichopitella						
Stichopites						
Strobilothyone						
Stueria						
Synaptites						
Tetravirga						
Thallatocanthus						
Theelia						
Triradites						
Uncinulina						
Uncinuloides						
Uniramosa						

== See also ==
- List of prehistoric brittle stars
- List of prehistoric starfish
- List of crinoid genera
