= Platanaster =

Scientific classification
- Kingdom: Animalia
- Phylum: Echinodermata
- Class: Asteroidea
- Order: †Platyasterida
- Family: †Palasteriscidae
- Subfamily: †Palasteriscinae
- Genus: †Platanaster

Extinct genus of starfishes

Platanaster ('plate star') is an extinct genus of sea stars.

== Taxonomy ==
†Palasteriscidae

- †Urasterellinae
  - †Cnemidactis
    - †C. girvanensis
  - †Urasterella
    - †U. asperrimus
- †Palasteriscinae
  - †Lanthanaster
    - †L. cruciformis
  - †Platanaster
    - †P. ordovicus
  - †Baliactis
    - †B. ordovicus
