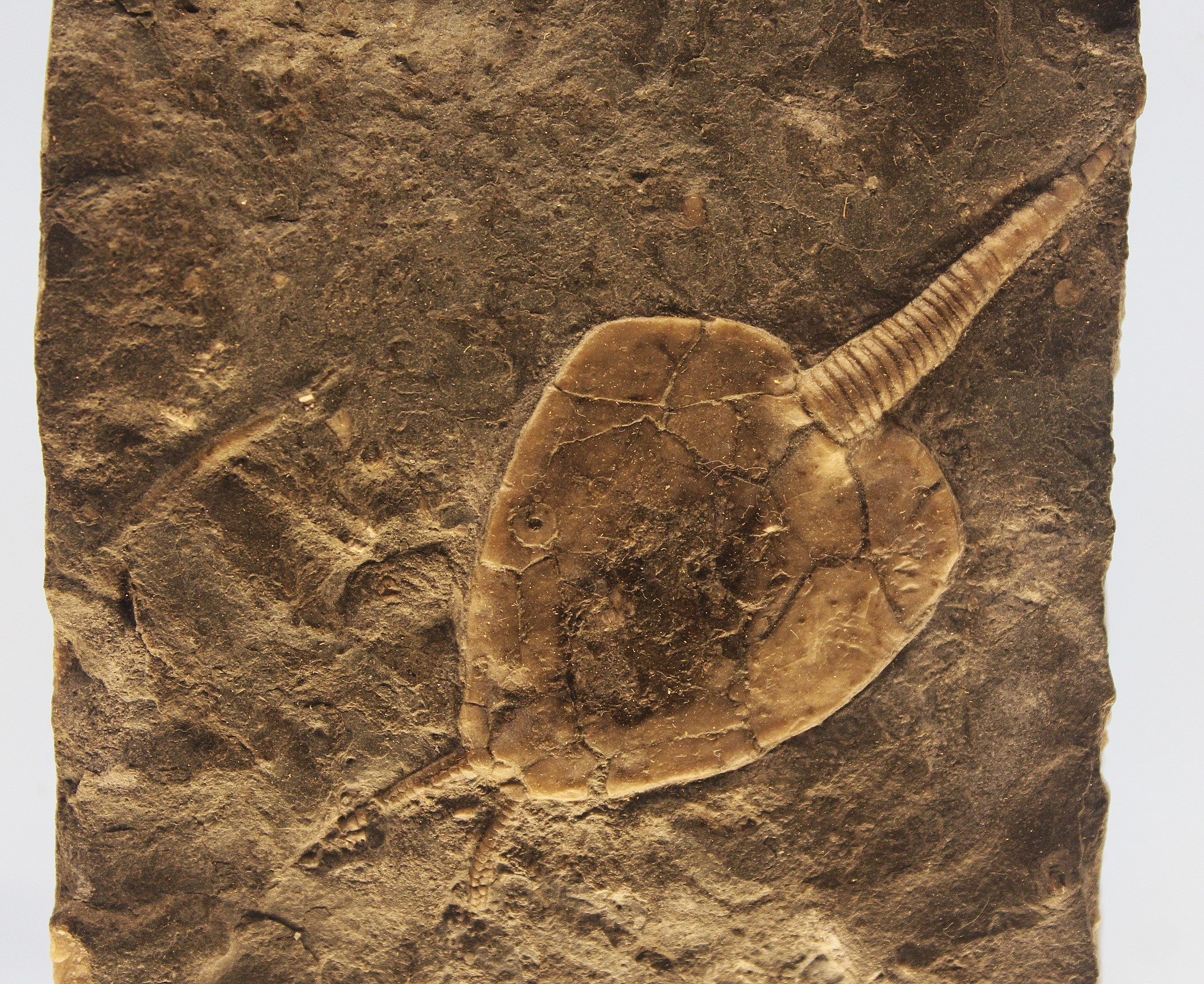
- Fossil of Amecystis laevis at the Smithsonian National Museum of Natural History

Scientific classification
- Domain: Eukaryota
- Kingdom: Animalia
- Phylum: Echinodermata
- Class: †Rhombifera
- Order: †Dichoporita
- Family: †Pleurocystitidae
- Genus: †Amecystis

= Amecystis =

Extinct genus of echinoderms

Amecystis is a Palaeozoic genus of rhombiferan echinoderm similar to Pleurocystites, lacking rhombs.
