= Peronella =

French fairy tale

Peronella is a fairy tale or fable that is considered a traditional French tale. Peronella is a pretty country lass who exchanges places with an old wizened queen, and receives the homage due to royalty, but gladly takes back her rags and beauty.
