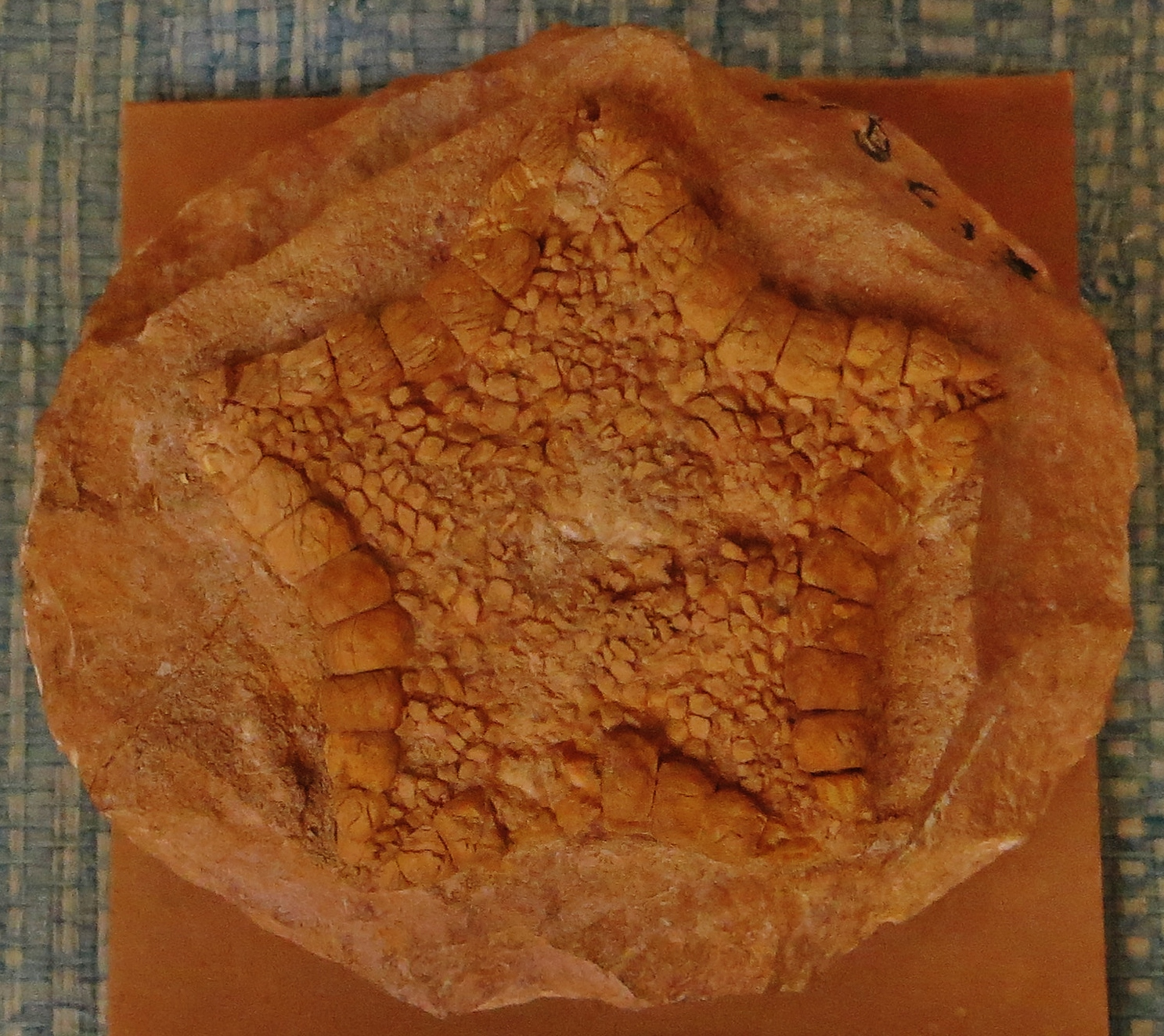

Scientific classification
- Kingdom: Animalia
- Phylum: Echinodermata
- Class: Asteroidea
- Order: Valvatida
- Family: Goniasteridae
- Genus: †Metopaster; Sladen, 1893

= Metopaster =

Metopaster Temporal range: 94.3–48.6 Ma

Extinct genus of starfishes

Metopaster is an extinct genus of sea star that lived from the Late Cretaceous to the Early Eocene. Its fossils have been found in Europe.

== Sources ==
- Fossils (Smithsonian Handbooks) by David Ward (Page 188)
