= Aglaocrinus =

Aglaocrinus Temporal range: 312.0–299.0 Ma Carboniferous

Scientific classification
- Kingdom: Animalia
- Phylum: Echinodermata
- Class: Crinoidea
- Order: Cladida
- Family: Dendrocrinidae
- Genus: Aglaocrinus Strimple, 1961

Species
- See text

Extinct genus of crinoids

Aglaocrinus is an extinct species of crinoids in the Cladia order. It has been proposed that it was a blind, stationary (attached) suspension feeder the hard parts of which were composed of magnesium calcite. It has been discovered in 3 locations in North America.

== Species ==
There are currently 12 species in this genus, consisting of:

- Aglaocrinus cranei (Strimple, 1971); also known as Aaglaocrinus cranei
- Aglaocrinus expansus
- Aglaocrinus keytei (Strimple & Moore 1973); also known as Aaglaocrinus keytai
- Aglaocrinus konecnyorum (Webster 1981)
- Aglaocrinus magnus (Strimple 1949)
- Aglaocrinus nacoensis (Webster 1981)
- Aglaocrinus oklahomensis (Moore & Plummer 1938); also known as Ethelocrinus oklahomensis (Moore & Plummer, 1938)
- Aglaocrinus rectilatus (Lane & Webster, 1966)
- Aglaocrinus supplantus (Pabian & Strimple 1974); also known as Aaglaocrinus supplantus
- Aglaocrinus sutherlandi (Strimple 1980)
- Aglaocrinus tuberculatus (Meek & Worthen 1867)
- Aglaocrinus verrucosus(White & St John 1868); also known as Hydreionocrinus verrucosus (White & St John 1868)
