= Lepocrinites =

Lepocrinites Temporal range: Ordovician–Silurian

Scientific classification
- Domain: Eukaryota
- Kingdom: Animalia
- Phylum: Echinodermata
- Class: †Rhombifera
- Order: †Dichoporita
- Family: †Callocystitidae
- Genus: †Lepocrinites; Conrad, 1840

Extinct genus of echinoderms

Lepocrinites is a genus of rhombiferan blastoids (Echinodermata).
