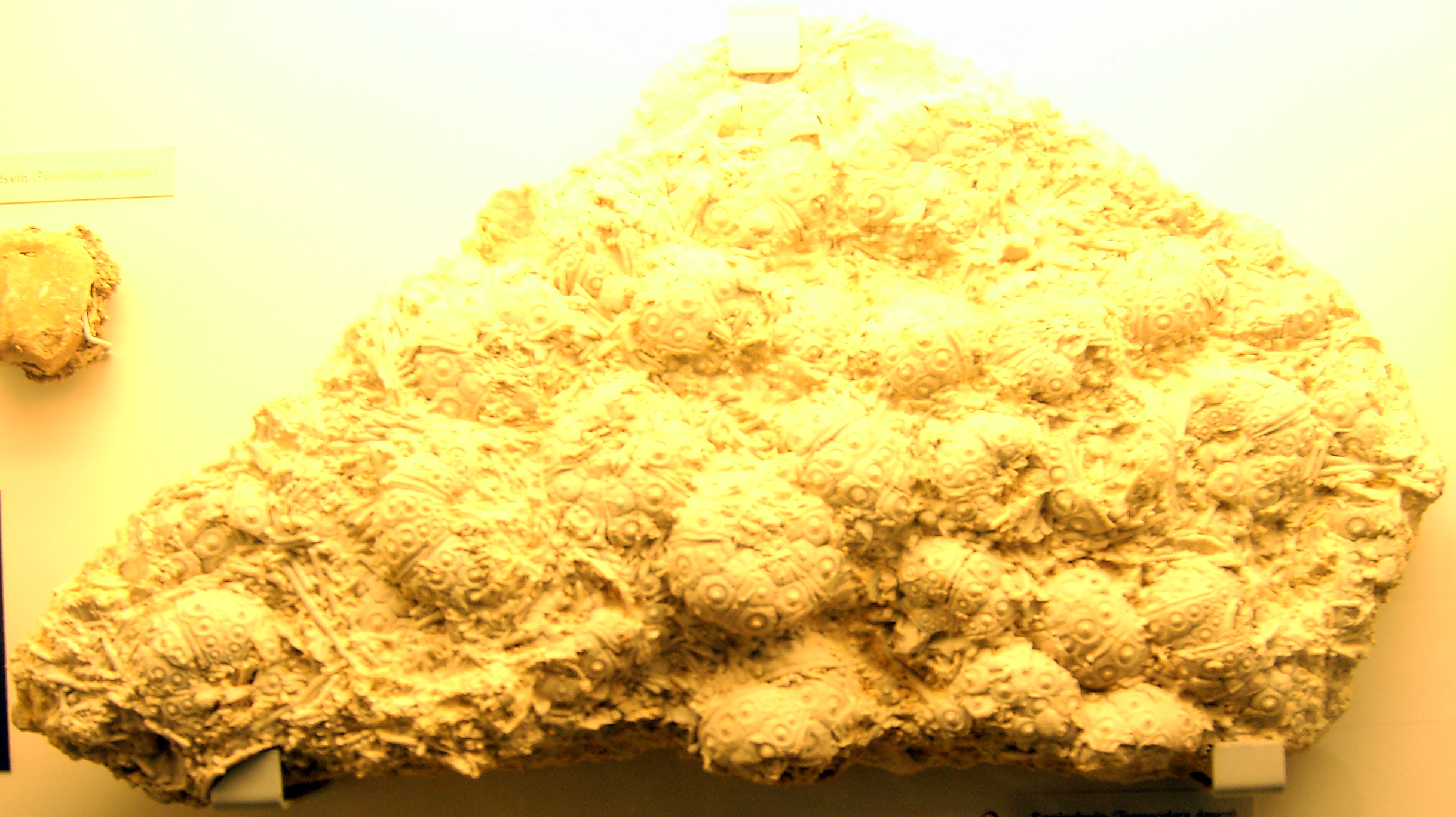
- Temnocidaris danica fossil at the Geological Museum, Copenhagen

Scientific classification
- Kingdom: Animalia
- Phylum: Echinodermata
- Class: Echinoidea
- Order: Cidaroida
- Genus: †Temnocidaris

= Temnocidaris =

Temnocidaris Temporal range: Late Cretaceous-Paleocene

Extinct genus of sea urchins

Temnocidaris is an extinct genus of echinoids that lived from the Late Cretaceous to the Paleocene. Its remains have been found in Europe and North America.
