= Stauranderaster =

Stauranderaster Temporal range: Late Jurassic-Paleocene，190–56 Ma

Scientific classification
- Kingdom: Animalia
- Phylum: Echinodermata
- Class: Asteroidea
- Order: Valvatida
- Family: †Stauranderasteridae
- Genus: †Stauranderaster; Spencer, 1905

Extinct genus of starfishes

Stauranderaster is an extinct genus of starfish that lived from the Late Jurassic to the Paleocene. Its fossils have been found in Europe.
