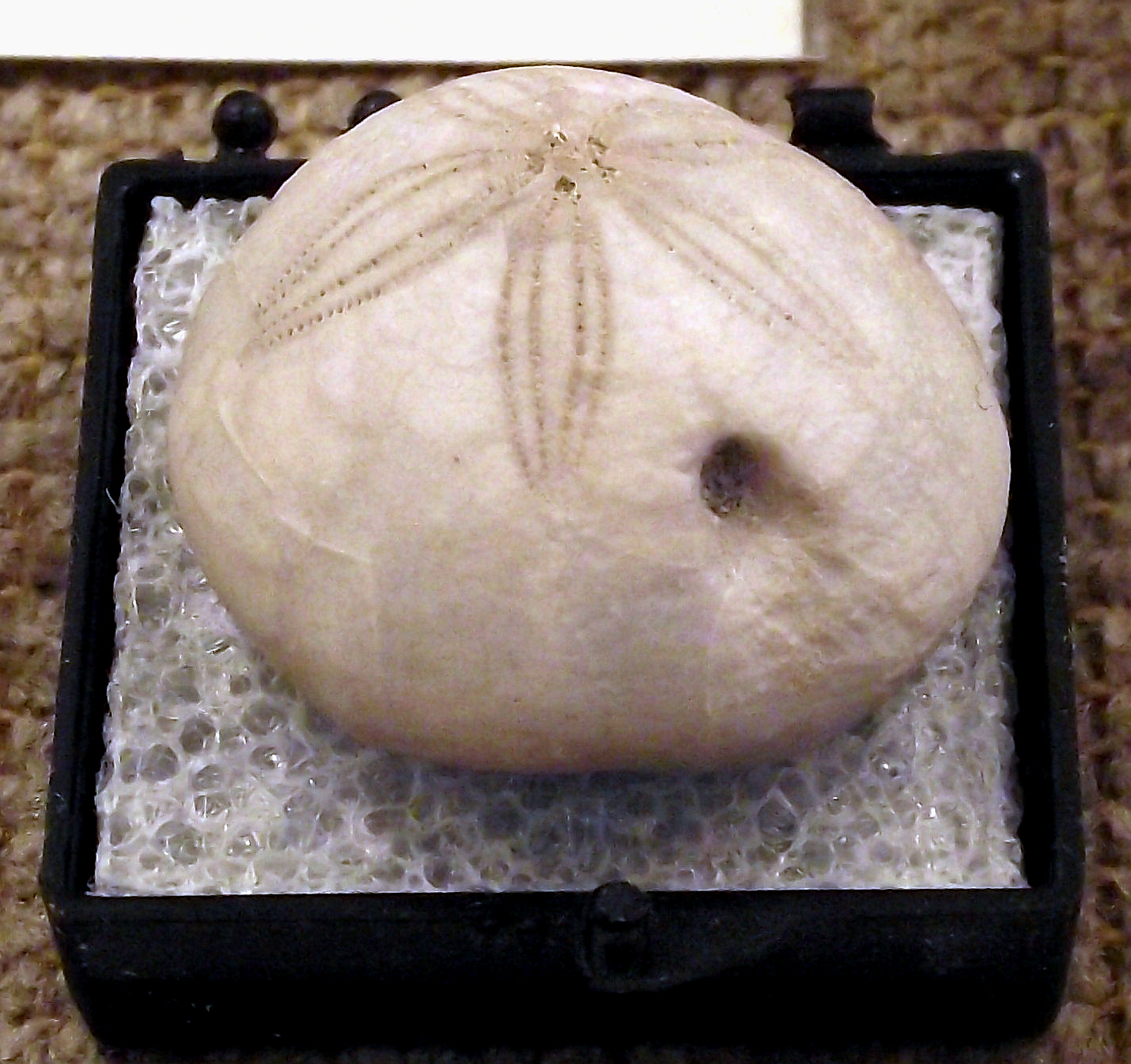
- Hardouinia florealis

Scientific classification
- Kingdom: Animalia
- Phylum: Echinodermata
- Class: Echinoidea
- Order: Cassiduloida
- Genus: †Hardouinia

= Hardouinia =

Hardouinia Temporal range: Late Cretaceous

Extinct genus of sea urchins

Hardouinia is an extinct genus of echinoids that lived in the Late Cretaceous. Its remains have been found in North America.
