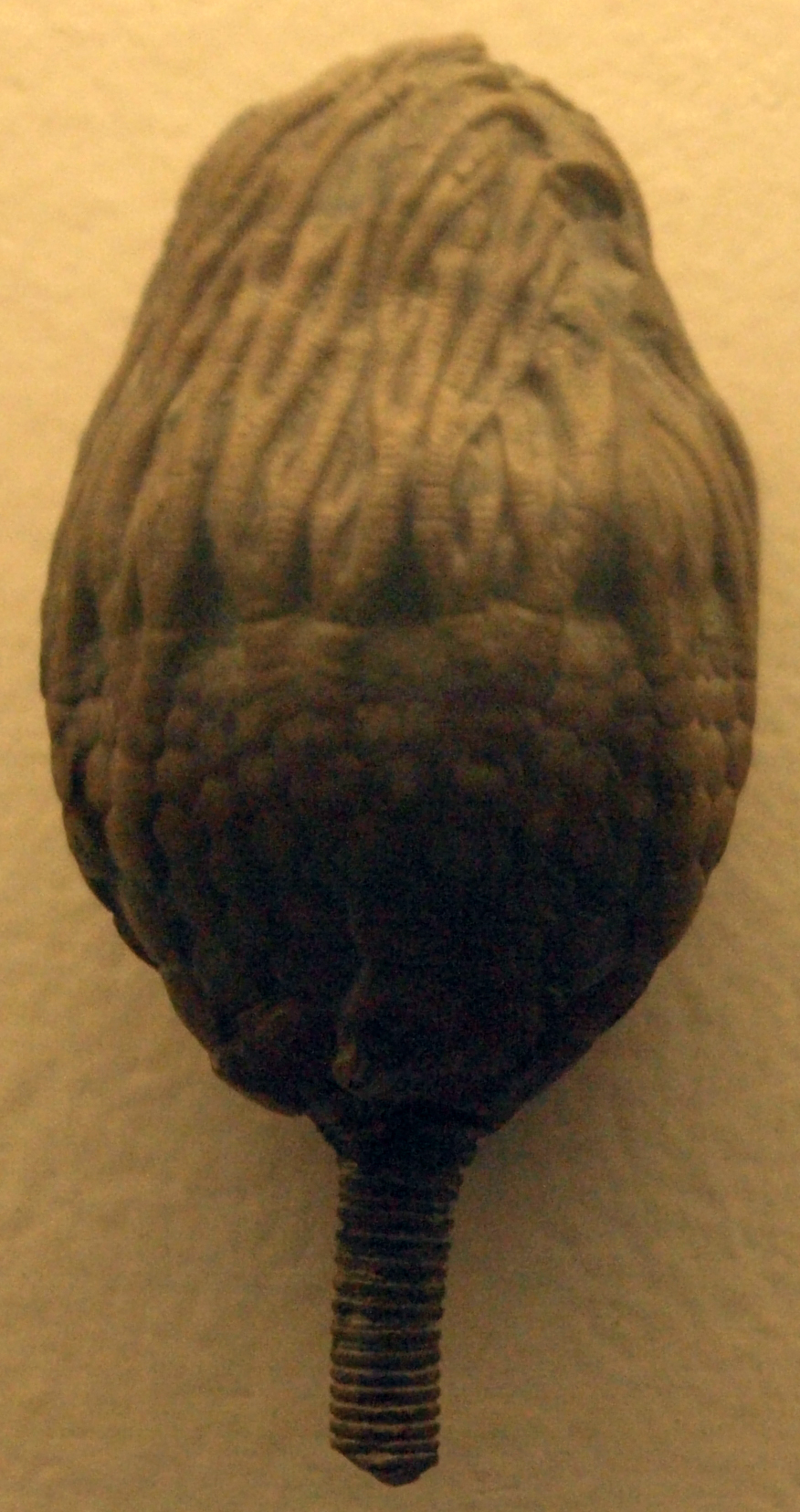
- Sagenocrinites expansus (Phillips), on display at the Natural History Museum

Scientific classification
- Domain: Eukaryota
- Kingdom: Animalia
- Phylum: Echinodermata
- Class: Crinoidea
- Order: †Sagenocrinida
- Genus: †Sagenocrinites; Austin, 1843

= Sagenocrinites =

Sagenocrinites Temporal range: Silurian

Extinct genus of crinoids

Sagenocrinites is an extinct genus of crinoid from the Silurian period. During the Silurian period, a sea-covered Britain that was shallower in the south and deeper in the north lay south of the equator with a tropical to sub-tropical climate. Therefore, in the United Kingdom, amongst Silurian fossils, such as brachiopods, trilobites and graptolites, coral-like organisms like Sagenocrinites can be found.

Because this species belongs to a genus of crinoids which is very sensitive concerning the environmental influences their petrified remains can therefore be viewed as indicators of the climate conditions. By using a geological world map, these fossils will help to create a complex climate model, tracing back more than 400 million years to the ancient Earth. With a high accuracy it will be possible to reconstruct the climate history of our planet.
