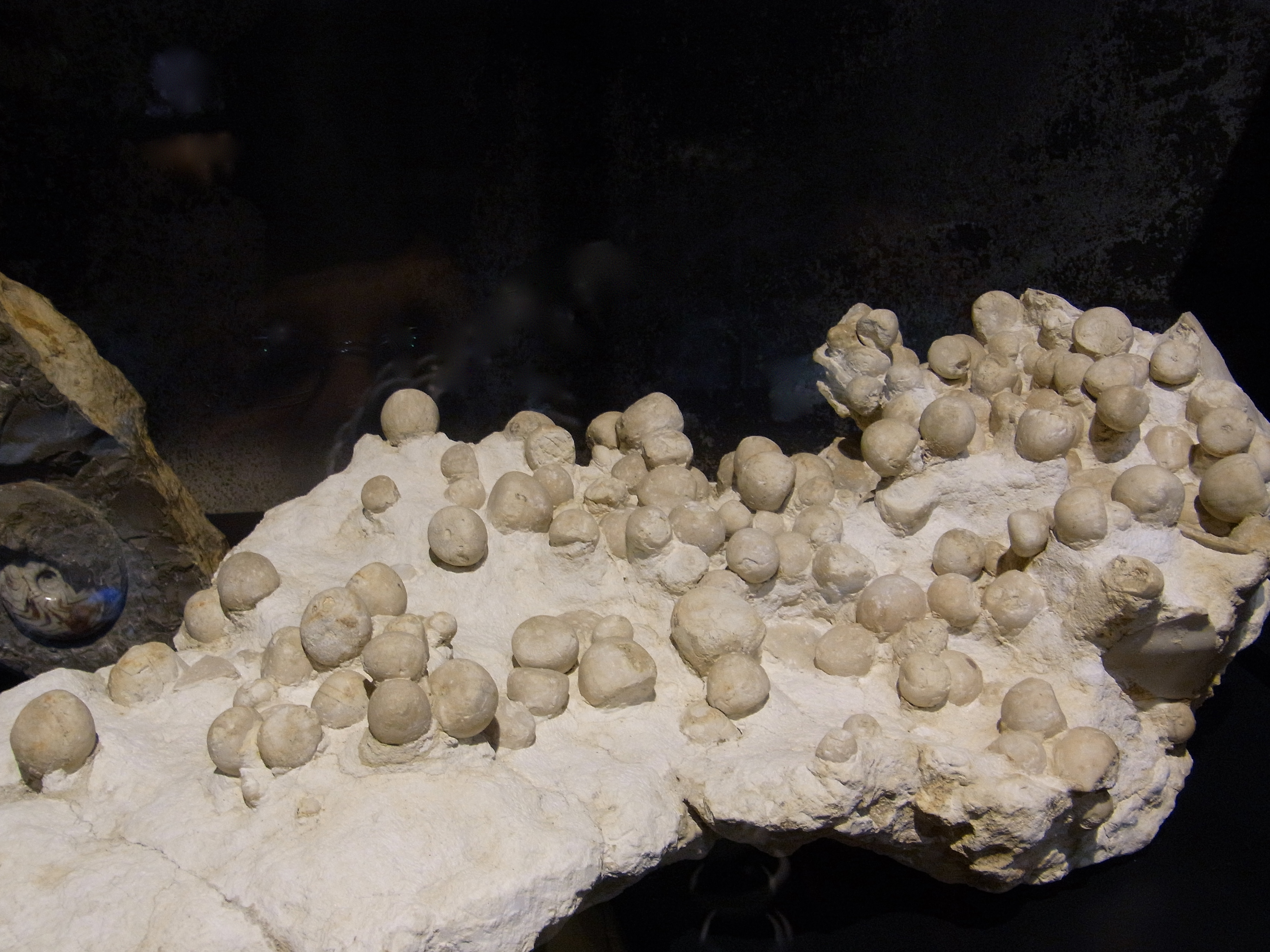

Scientific classification
- Kingdom: Animalia
- Phylum: Echinodermata
- Class: Echinoidea
- Order: Echinoneoida
- Family: †Conulidae
- Genus: †Conulus; Leske, 1778

Synonyms
- Pyrina Des Moulins, 1835

= Conulus =

Conulus Temporal range: Cretaceous 125.0–65.5 Ma

Extinct genus of sea urchins

Conulus is an extinct genus of echinoids (sea urchins) that lived in the Cretaceous. Remains of Conulus species have been found in Asia, Europe, and North America.

== Species ==
The following species are recognised in the genus Conulus:

- †Conulus angulatus Tzankov, 1982
- †Conulus azerbaidjanensis Melikov
- †Conulus campaniformis Melikov & Endel'man, 1963
- †Conulus castaneus (Brongniart, 1822)
- †Conulus chiapasensis Lambert, 1936
- †Conulus chiesai Airaghi, 1939
- †Conulus cookei Buitrón, 1974
- †Conulus cubensis Sánchez Roig, 1949
- †Conulus djanelidzei Gongadze, 1972
- †Conulus grauensis Currie, 1943
- †Conulus isopyramidatus Melikov
- †Conulus kubatliensis Melikov in Halilov & Melikov, 1988
- †Conulus lamberti Buitrón, 1974
- †Conulus matesovi Moskvin & Poslavskaya, 1959
- †Conulus mixtus (Defrance, 1820)
- †Conulus mullerriedi Lambert, 1935
- †Conulus parravanoi Checchia-Rispoli, 1932
- †Conulus praenuntius Carter, 1928
- †Conulus rothomagensis (Sismonda, 1844)
- †Conulus sanfilippoi Checchia-Rispoli, 1930
- †Conulus sinensis Mu & Wu, 1976
- †Conulus stephensoni Cooke, 1953
- †Conulus subpyramidatus Melikov
- †Conulus subrotundus Mantell, 1822
- †Conulus tradis Lees, 1928
- †Conulus zinai Airaghi, 1939
