= Holectypus =

Holectypus Temporal range: 170.3–89.8 Ma Bajocian to Turonian

Scientific classification
- Kingdom: Animalia
- Phylum: Echinodermata
- Class: Echinoidea
- Order: Holectypoida
- Family: †Holectypidae
- Genus: †Holectypus; Desor, 1842

Extinct genus of sea urchins

Holectypus is an extinct genus of sea urchin. It lived from the Jurassic to the Cretaceous. Fossils have been found all around the world.
