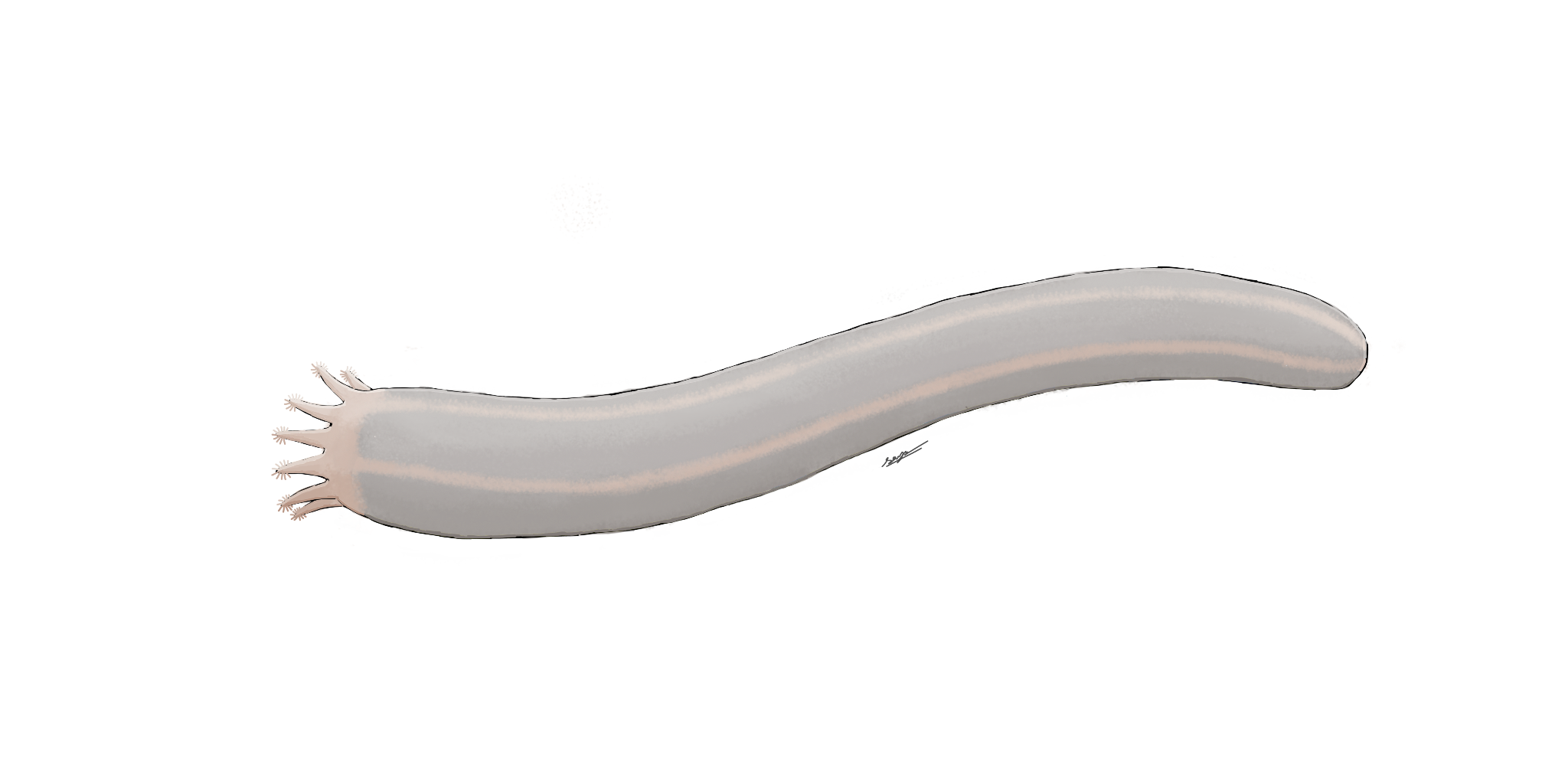
- Life reconstruction of Porosothyone picketti

Scientific classification
- Kingdom: Animalia
- Phylum: Echinodermata
- Class: Holothuroidea
- Genus: †Porosothyone; Jell, 2011

Type species
- Porosothyone picketti Jell, 2011

= Porosothyone =

Porosothyone Temporal range: Ludlow–Pridoli

Extinct genus of echinoderm

Porosothyone is an extinct genus of sea cucumber known from the Silurian of Australia, which includes a single species, Porosothyone picketti. It is regarded as the earliest body fossil of this group.

== Discovery and etymology ==
Its fossils are described from the upper Silurian sequences in the Yass Basin, New South Wales. Specimens, including the holotype, are known from Pridoli in the Elmside Formation, while there are also some fossils from upper Ludlow in the Black Bog Shale. The genus name comes from the Latin porosus, which means full of holes, after its highly perforate skin ossicles, and thyone, which is commonly used in the names of holothurian genera. The specific epithet is references John Picket, from the Geological Survey of New South Wales, who first recognized the specimens.

== Description ==
Porosothyone is a cigar-shaped sea cucumber with a body up to 40 mm (1.6 in) in length and 7 mm (0.28 in) wide, both ends being slightly narrower. Its body is covered by overlapping, highly perforated sieve plate skin ossicles which are wider than long, with broadly curved anterior margins and spires absent. Its ventral mouth is surrounded by a calcareous ring which consists of five radial and five interradial elements.

== Classification ==
Porosothyone is one of the oldest known holothurians with articulated fossils. Although one analysis has put it inside the crown group Holothuria, as a stem group Apodida, its relationships within the holothurian crown group are not yet clearly resolved.
