= Protremaster =

Protremaster Temporal range: Early Jurassic

Scientific classification
- Kingdom: Animalia
- Phylum: Echinodermata
- Class: Asteroidea
- Order: Valvatida
- Family: Asterinidae
- Genus: †Protremaster; Smith and Tranter 1985

Type species
- Protremaster universalis Smith and Tranter 1985

Extinct genus of starfishes

Protremaster is an extinct genus of sea stars that lived in the Early Jurassic (age range: 196.5 to 189.6 Ma). Its fossils have been found in the Lully Foothills Formation of Antarctica.
