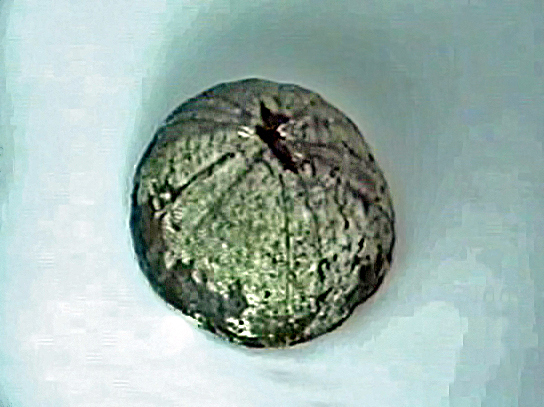
- Fossil of Conoclypus conoideus at the Naturmuseum Senckenberg, Frankfurt

Scientific classification
- Kingdom: Animalia
- Phylum: Echinodermata
- Class: Echinoidea
- Order: Clypeasteroida
- Family: †Conoclypeidae
- Genus: †Conoclypus; L. Agassiz, 1839

= Conoclypus =

Extinct genus of sea urchins

Conoclypus - from the Greek words Konos (= cone) + clypus (= disc) - is a genus of sea urchins belonging to the family Conoclypeidae.

== Description ==
These fossil echinoderms are characterized by a conical calcareous structure. They were slow-moving semi-infaunal detritivore, living in the late Eocene until the Miocene.

== Distribution ==
Species of this genus have been found in Miocene of Austria and in Eocene of Germany, Italy, Slovenia and Pakistan.

== Species ==
- Conoclypus conoideus (Leske, 1778); Middle Eocene, Europe
- Conoclypus pilgrimi Davies, 1927; Lower Eocene, Pakistan
- Conoclypus pinfoldi Gill, 1953; Lower Eocene, Pakistan
- Conoclypus lorioli (Dames, 1877); Eocene, Italy & Slovenia
