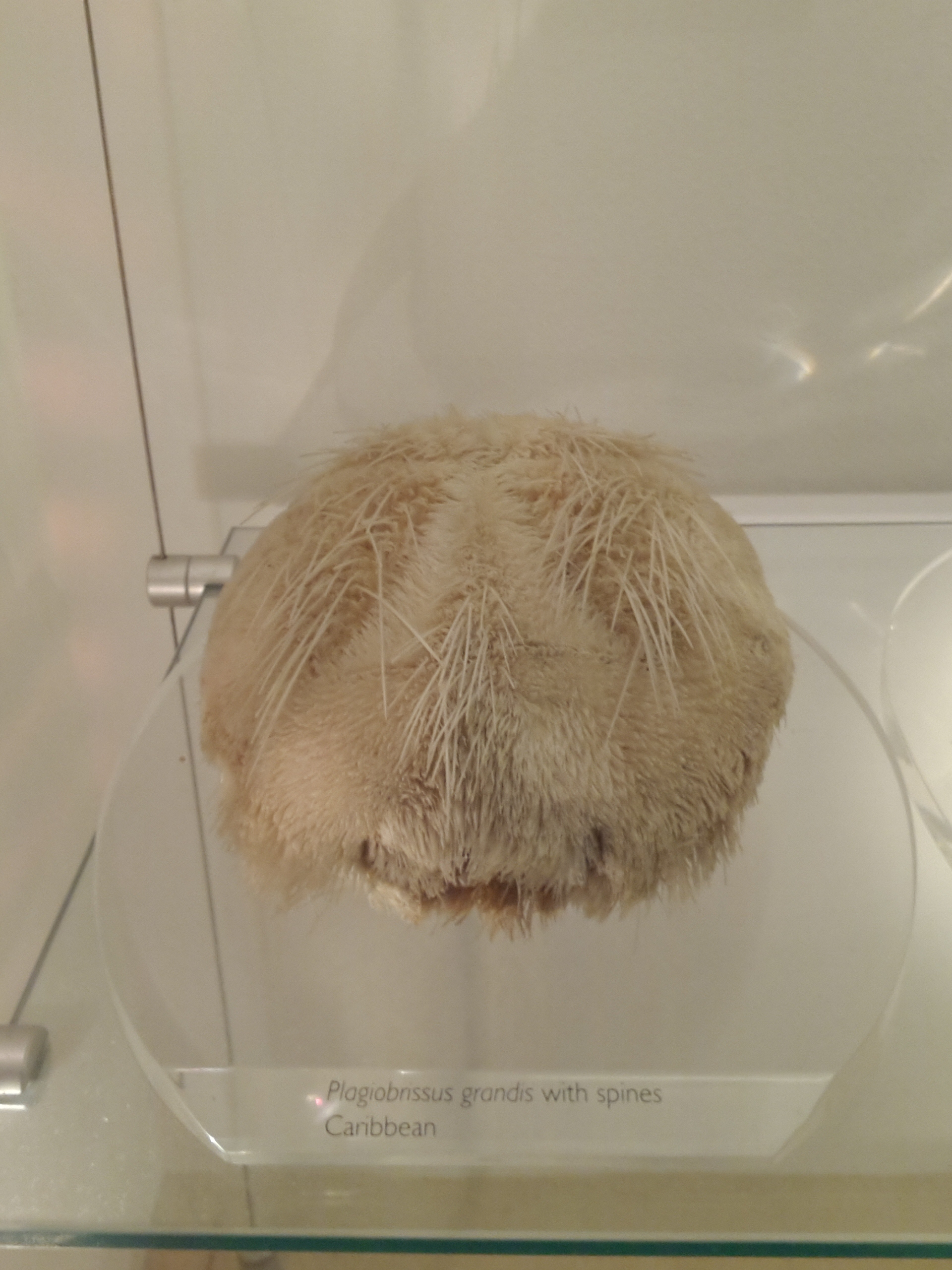
- Plagiobrissus grandis

Scientific classification
- Kingdom: Animalia
- Phylum: Echinodermata
- Class: Echinoidea
- Order: Spatangoida
- Family: Brissidae
- Genus: Plagiobrissus; Pomel, 1883

= Plagiobrissus =

Genus of sea urchins

Plagiobrissus is a genus of echinoderms belonging to the family Brissidae.

The species of this genus are found in Mediterranean and America.

Species:

- Plagiobrissus abeli Reidl, 1941
- Plagiobrissus abruptus Arnold & H.L. Clark, 1927
- Plagiobrissus africanus (Verrill, 1871)
- Plagiobrissus costae (Gasco, 1876)
- Plagiobrissus costaricensis Durham, 1961
- Plagiobrissus elevatus Arnold & H.L. Clark, 1927
- Plagiobrissus grandis (Gmelin, 1791)
- Plagiobrissus jullieni (Cotteau, 1889)
- Plagiobrissus lamberti Jeannet, 1928
- Plagiobrissus latus Arnold & H.L. Clark, 1927
- Plagiobrissus loveni Cotteau, 1875
- Plagiobrissus malavassii Durham, 1961
- Plagiobrissus pacificus H.L. Clark, 1940
- Plagiobrissus perplexus Arnold & H.L. Clark, 1927
- Plagiobrissus robustus Arnold & H.L. Clark, 1927
