= Plesiocidaris =

Plesiocidaris Temporal range: Late Jurassic

Scientific classification
- Kingdom: Animalia
- Phylum: Echinodermata
- Class: Echinoidea
- Order: †Hemicidaroida
- Genus: †Plesiocidaris; Pomel, 1883
- Species: †P. durandi

Binomial name
- †Plesiocidaris durandi Pomel, 1883

Extinct genus of sea urchins

Plesiocidaris durandi is an extinct species of sea urchins. Including its spines, the creature was 13 cm (5 in) wide. Its remains have been found in Drâ el-Ahmar, near the Atlas Mountains in Oran, Algeria. A Commander Durand found the fossils there in 1870 and sent them to French paleontologists. The exact location of the find was not noted and has not been rediscovered since. The species name, durandi, refers to Commander Durand. Most Plesiocidaris fossils still have the spines attached, indicating they lived in calm water; the spines of dead sea urchins are easily detached by wave currents.
