= Rhabdotites =

Rhabdotites Temporal range: Triassic

Scientific classification
- Kingdom: Animalia
- Phylum: Echinodermata
- Class: Holothuroidea
- Family: †Stichopitidae
- Genus: †Rhabdotites; Deflandre-Rigaud, 1952

Extinct genus of sea cucumbers

Rhabdotites is an extinct genus of sea cucumbers which existed in Poland during the Triassic period. It contains the species Rhabdotites mortenseni and Rhabdotites rectus. The genus is based on isolated sclerites, described as simple or branching rods with knobbed ends.
