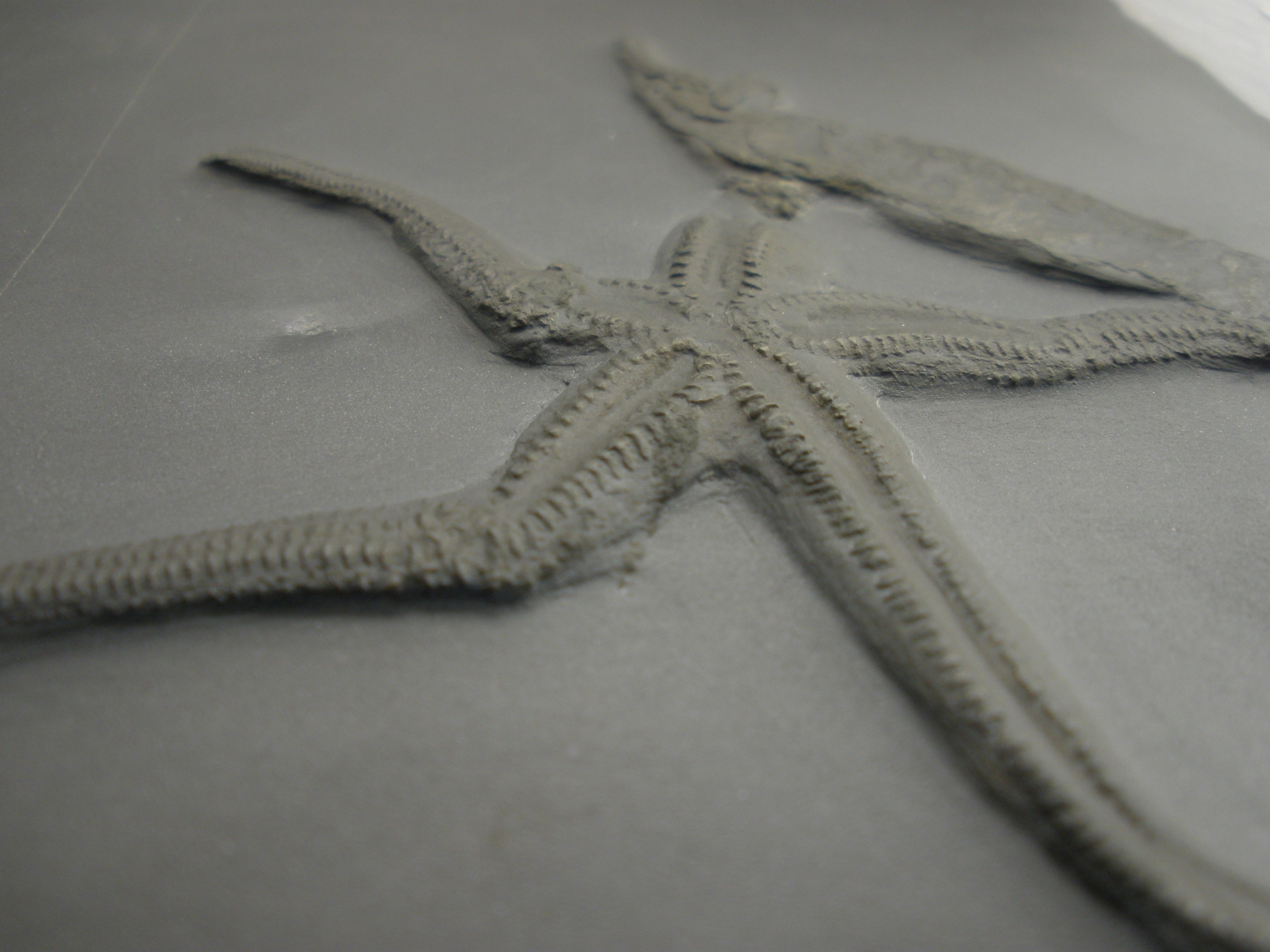
- Urasterella asperula

Scientific classification
- Kingdom: Animalia
- Phylum: Echinodermata
- Class: Asteroidea
- Order: †Platyasterida
- Family: †Palasteriscidae
- Subfamily: †Urasterellinae
- Genus: †Urasterella; McCoy (1851)

Species
- see text

Synonyms
- Palasteracanthion; Phillipaster; Protasteracanthion; Roemeraster; Salteraster; Ulrichaster

= Urasterella =

Urasterella Temporal range: 460.5–388.1 Ma Ordovician to Devonian

Extinct genus of starfishes

Urasterella is an extinct genus of sea stars that lived from the Ordovician to the Devonian. Its fossils are known from Europe, North America and southern Africa.

== Species ==
There have been a number of species assigned or transferred to the genus since its description in 1851.

- U. asperrimus
- U. asperula (syn. Protasteracanthion primus)
- U. biradialis (syn. Salteraster biradialis)
- U. constellata
- U. coronella (syn. Salteraster coronella)
- U. creswelli
- U. grandis
- U. gutterfordensis
- U. huxleyi
- U. imbricatus (syn. Salteraster imbricatus)
- U. montana
- U. pulchella
- U. ruthveni
- U. selwyni (syn. Salteraster selwyni)
- U. thraivensis
- U. ulrichi
