= Calclamnoidea =

Calclamnoidea Temporal range: Middle Triassic - Late Jurassic

Scientific classification
- Domain: Eukaryota
- Kingdom: Animalia
- Phylum: Echinodermata
- Class: Holothuroidea
- Order: Dendrochirotida
- Family: †Calclamnidae
- Genus: †Calclamnoidea; Frizzell & Exline, 1955

Type species
- Calclamoidea collaris (Deflandre-Rigaud, 1952)

Species
- C. collaris (Deflandre-Rigaud, 1952); C. canalifera Kristan-Tollman, 1963; C. crassomarginata Kristan-Tollmann, 1972

Genus of echinoderms

Calclamnoidea is an extinct genus of sea cucumber which existed in Poland during the Triassic period.
