= Schlumbergerites =

Schlumbergerites Temporal range: Triassic–Jurassic

Scientific classification
- Kingdom: Animalia
- Phylum: Echinodermata
- Class: Holothuroidea
- Order: Dendrochirotida
- Family: †Schlumbergeritidae
- Genus: †Schlumbergerites; Deflandre-Rigaud, 1962

Extinct genus of sea cucumbers

Schlumbergerites is a genus of extinct sea cucumbers which existed in Poland during the Triassic period. The type species is Schlumbergerites sievertsae.
