= Staurocumites =

Staurocumites Temporal range: Triassic–Jurassic

Scientific classification
- Kingdom: Animalia
- Phylum: Echinodermata
- Class: Holothuroidea
- Genus: †Staurocumites; Deflandre-Rigaud, 1952

Extinct genus of sea cucumbers

Staurocumites is an extinct genus of sea cucumbers which existed in Europe during the Triassic and Jurassic periods. The type species is Staurocumites bartensteini.
