= Eocaudina =

Scientific classification
- Domain: Eukaryota
- Kingdom: Animalia
- Phylum: Echinodermata
- Class: Holothuroidea
- Order: Dendrochirotida
- Family: †Calclamnidae
- Subfamily: †Eocaudiniinae
- Genus: †Eocaudina; Martin, 1952

Extinct genus of sea cucumbers

Eocaudina is an extinct genus of sea cucumbers which existed in Poland during the Triassic period. It contains the species Eocaudina septaforaminalis and Eocaudina subhexagona.
