= Stichopites =

Stichopites Temporal range: Middle Triassic to Late Jurassic

Scientific classification
- Domain: Eukaryota
- Kingdom: Animalia
- Phylum: Echinodermata
- Subphylum: Echinozoa
- Class: Holothuroidea
- Family: †Stichopitidae
- Genus: †Stichopites; Deflandre and Deflandre-Rigaud, 1948

Type species
- Stichopites mortenseni Deflandre-Rigaud, 1952

Synonyms
- Prostichopus Frentzen 1964

Extinct genus of sea cucumbers

Stichopites is an extinct genus of sea cucumbers which existed during the Anisian age of the Middle Triassic to the Kimmeridgian age of the Late Jurassic (approximately 245.0 to 150.8 million years ago). The type species is Stichopites mortenseni. Fossils of Stichopites have been recovered in Poland, France, and Egypt.
