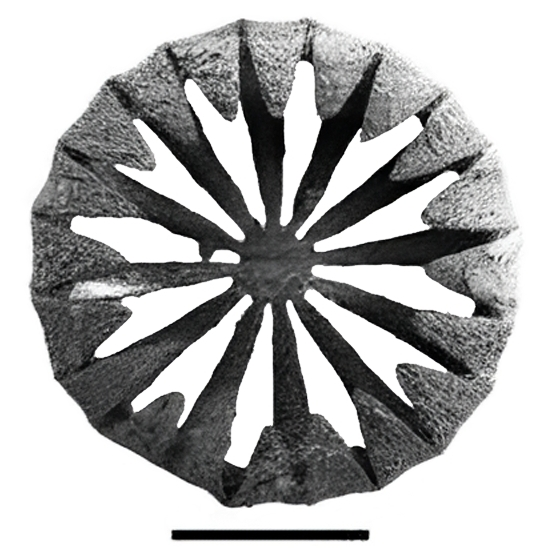
- Hemisphaeranthos sp.

Scientific classification
- Kingdom: Animalia
- Phylum: Echinodermata
- Class: Holothuroidea
- Order: Apodida
- Family: Myriotrochidae
- Genus: †Hemisphaeranthos; Terquem & Berthelin, 1875

Species
- See text

Synonyms
- †Actinoclava Müller, 1912; †Hemisphaeranthus Terquem [lapsus]; †Hemisphaerantus Terquem [lapsus]; †Myriotrochites Deflandre-Rigaud, 1951; †Stueria Schlumberger, 1888; †Swabiaina Soodan, 1991

= Hemisphaeranthos =

Extinct genus of sea cucumbers

Hemisphaeranthos is an extinct genus of sea cucumbers. The following species are recognised in the genus Hemisphaeranthos:

- †Hemisphaeranthos costifera Terquem & Berthelin, 1875
- †Hemisphaeranthos elegans (Schlumberger, 1888)
- †Hemisphaeranthos frankei (Müller, 1912)
- †Hemisphaeranthos simplex A.H. Müller, 1964
