= Calclamna =

Calclamna Temporal range: Middle Triassic - Lower Jurassic

Scientific classification
- Domain: Eukaryota
- Kingdom: Animalia
- Phylum: Echinodermata
- Class: Holothuroidea
- Order: Dendrochirotida
- Family: †Calclamnidae
- Genus: †Calclamna; Frizzell & Exline, 1955

Type species
- Calclamna germanica Frizzell & Exline, 1955

Synonyms
- C. uermanica, Frizzell & Exline, 1955; Cibrum longipontinum, Frentzen, 1964

Genus of echinoderms

Calclamna is an extinct genus of sea cucumber which existed in Europe during the Triassic and Jurassic period. The type species is Calclamna germanica.
