= 2018 in echinoderm paleontology =

Paleontology or palaeontology is the study of prehistoric life forms on Earth through the examination of plant and animal fossils. This includes the study of body fossils, tracks (ichnites), burrows, cast-off parts, fossilised feces (coprolites), palynomorphs and chemical residues. Because humans have encountered fossils for millennia, paleontology has a long history both before and after becoming formalized as a science. This article records significant discoveries and events related to paleontology that occurred or were published in the year 2018.

== Echinoderms ==
=== Research ===
- A study on the morphology of specimens of the blastoid species Deltoblastus batheri and Deltoblastus delta from the Permian of Timor, evaluating whether the differences indicative of niche differentiation could be detected, is published by Morgan (2018).
- A study on the morphological development of the primary large thecal plate in the widest part of the theca of Guizhoueocrinus yui is published online by Wang et al. (2018).
- Fatka, Nohejlová & Lefebvre (2018) interpret enigmatic Drumian echinoderm Lapillocystites fragilis as likely junior synonym of the edrioasteroid species Stromatocystites pentangularis.
- A study on the frequency of breakage and regeneration in the spines of the Middle Devonian camerate Gennaeocrinus and late Paleozoic cladids, as well as a survey of the prevalence of spinosity and infestation by platyceratid gastropods on crinoids during the Paleozoic, is published by Syverson et al. (2018).
- Brachial spines of pirasocrinid cladid crinoids displaying evidence for multiple episodes of breakage and regeneration are described from the Upper Pennsylvanian Ames Member of the Glenshaw Formation (Ohio, United States) by Thomka & Eddy (2018).
- A study on the morphology of arms of fossil and modern crinoids spanning from the Ordovician to the recent, evaluating whether known crinoid clades had more capacity to evolve morphological variation around the time of their origin than later in their evolutionary history, is published by Pimiento et al. (2018).
- A study on the changes of the body sizes of crinoids after the Late Devonian extinction is published by Brom, Salamon & Gorzelak (2018).
- A study on the phylogenetic relationships of disparid crinoids is published by Ausich (2018).
- A study on the microstructure of the stalk of the Triassic crinoid Holocrinus is published by Gorzelak (2018), who interprets his findings as indicating that Holocrinus was likely capable of stalk autotomy.
- A study on the occurrences of post-Paleozoic (Ladinian to Ypresian) crinoids from northeast Spain, on the main stratigraphic and sedimentological features of the sedimentary units that have yielded complete identifiable crinoids, and on their implications for reconstructing the environmental distribution of these crinoids, is published by Zamora et al. (2018).
- 37 new Antarctic and Australian occurrences of Cenozoic isocrinid crinoids, representing nine different species in three genera, are reported by Whittle et al. (2018), who interpret their findings as indicating that isocrinid migration from shallow to deep water during the Mesozoic marine revolution did not occur at the same time all over the world.
- A study on the evolution of Paleozoic starfish is published by Blake (2018), who names new extinct orders Euaxosida, Hadrosida, and Kermasida, as well as new families Lacertasteridae, Permasteridae, and Illusioluididae.
- A study on the evolution of the species richness and morphological diversity of sea urchins in the Jurassic (Toarcian to Tithonian stages) is published by Boivin et al. (2018).

=== New taxa ===
Name	Novelty	Status	Authors	Age	Unit	Location	Notes	Images
Amphilimna intersepultosetme	Sp. nov	Valid	Thuy, Numberger-Thuy & Jagt	Late Cretaceous (Maastrichtian)	Peedee Formation	United States (South Carolina)	A brittle star belonging to the order Amphilepidida, the superfamily Ophionereidoidea and the family Amphilimnidae.	
Amphiope caronei	Sp. nov	Valid	Stara & Marini	Miocene (late Tortonian)		Italy	A sand dollar belonging to the family Astriclypeidae.	
Amphioplus clementsi	Sp. nov	Valid	Thuy, Numberger-Thuy & Jagt	Late Cretaceous (Maastrichtian)	Peedee Formation	United States (South Carolina)	A brittle star belonging to the family Amphiuridae.	
Amphiura shannoni	Sp. nov	Valid	Thuy, Numberger-Thuy & Jagt	Late Cretaceous (Maastrichtian)	Peedee Formation	United States (South Carolina)	A brittle star belonging to the family Amphiuridae, a species of Amphiura.	
Anomalocrinus astrictus	Sp. nov	Valid	Ausich et al.	Ordovician (Katian)	Brechin Lagerstätte	Canada (Ontario)	A disparid crinoid belonging to the family Anomalocrinidae.	
Antiquaster apertisulcus	Sp. nov	Valid	Gladwell	Silurian (Ludlow)	Leintwardine Beds	United Kingdom	A stenurid brittle star.	
Arabicodiadema romani	Sp. nov	Valid	Smith & Jagt in Jagt et al.	Cretaceous	Dhalqut Formation	Oman	A sea urchin.	
Archaeocrinus maraensis	Sp. nov	Valid	Cole et al.	Ordovician (Katian)		Canada (Ontario)	A camerate crinoid.	
Archaeocrinus sundayae	Sp. nov	Valid	Cole et al.	Ordovician (Katian)		Canada (Ontario)	A camerate crinoid.	
Artichthyocrinus limani	Sp. nov	Valid	Mao et al.	Permian (Asselian)	Taiyuan Formation	China	A crinoid.	
Assericrinus	Gen. et sp. nov	Valid	Gale	Late Cretaceous (early Campanian)		United Kingdom	A crinoid. The type species is A. portusadernensis.	
Bdellacoma fortispina	Sp. nov	Valid	Gladwell	Silurian (Ludlow)	Leintwardine Beds	United Kingdom	A stenurid brittle star.	
Becuaster	Gen. et sp. nov	Valid	Gale	Late Jurassic (Oxfordian)		France	A starfish belonging to the family Korethrasteridae. The type species is B. fusiliformis	
Betelgeusia brezinai	Sp. nov	Valid	Blake, Halligan & Larson	Late Cretaceous		United States (South Dakota)		
Birgenelocrinus jagti	Sp. nov	Valid	Gale in Gale, Sadorf & Jagt	Late Cretaceous (Maastrichtian)	Peedee Formation	United States (North Carolina)	A crinoid belonging to the group Roveacrinida.	
Brezinacantha	Gen. et sp. nov	Valid	Thuy et al.	Late Cretaceous (Campanian)	Pierre Shale	United States (South Dakota)	A brittle star belonging to the family Ophiacanthidae. The type species is B. tolis.	
Camachoaster	Gen. et sp. nov	Valid	Mooi et al.	Early Miocene	Chenque Formation	Argentina	A sand dollar belonging to the group Scutelliformes. The type species is C. maquedensis	
Cicerocrinus gracilis	Sp. nov	Valid	Donovan in Bogolepova et al.	Silurian (Wenlock)	Uzyan Formation	Russia (Bashkortostan)	A crinoid belonging to the subclass Disparida, to the order Pisocrinida and to the family Pisocrinidae.	
Cleiocrinus lepidotus	Sp. nov	Valid	Cole et al.	Ordovician (Katian)		Canada (Ontario)	A camerate crinoid.	
Clypeaster sarawakensis	Sp. nov	Valid	Mihaljević & Rosenblatt	Miocene		Malaysia	A species of Clypeaster.	
Conulus sanzgarciai	Sp. nov	Valid	Forner Valls & Moreno Bedmar	Early Cretaceous (Aptian)	Forcall Formation	Spain	A sea urchin.	
Costatocrinus laevis	Sp. nov	Valid	Gale	Late Cretaceous (early Campanian)		United Kingdom	A crinoid.	
Delicaster hotchkissi	Sp. nov	Valid	Blake & Koniecki	Carboniferous (Pennsylvanian)	Canyon Series, Graford Group	United States (Texas)	A starfish belonging to the order Kermasida and to the family Permasteridae.	
Diplocidaris bernasconii	Sp. nov	Valid	Bischof, Hostettler & Menkveld-Gfeller	Late Jurassic (Oxfordian)	St-Ursanne Formation	Switzerland; France?	A sea urchin belonging to the group Cidaroida and the family Diplocidaridae. Originally described as a species of Diplocidaris, but subsequently made the type species of the separate genus Pseudodiplocidaris.	
Elgaecrinus	Gen. et sp. nov	Valid	Rozhnov	Devonian (Lochkovian)	Katnikov Beds	Russia (Sverdlovsk Oblast)	A cladid crinoid related to Crotalocrinites. The type species is E. uralicus	
Eocenocrinus	Gen. et 2 sp. et comb. nov	Valid	Merle & Roux	Eocene		France; Italy	A stalked crinoid, possibly the oldest known member of the family Phrynocrinidae. The type species is E. hessi; genus also includes new species E. bayani, as well as "Bourgueticrinus" didymus Schauroth (1855).	
Euptychocrinus? atelis	Sp. nov	In press	Botting	Late Ordovician		Morocco	A camerate crinoid. Announced in 2018; the final version of the article naming it is not published yet.	
Goniopygus dhalqutensis	Sp. nov	Valid	Smith & Jagt in Jagt et al.	Cretaceous	Dhalqut Formation	Oman	A sea urchin.	
Hansaster	Gen. et comb. nov	Valid	Gale	Late Jurassic (Oxfordian)		France; Germany; Switzerland	A starfish belonging to the family Pterasteridae. Genus includes "Savignaster" trimbachensis Gale (2011).	
Hessicrinus apertus	Sp. nov	Valid	Gale	Late Cretaceous (early Campanian)		United Kingdom	A crinoid.	
Hessicrinus cooperi	Sp. nov	Valid	Gale	Late Cretaceous (early Campanian)		United Kingdom	A crinoid.	
Heteraster guali	Sp. nov	Valid	Forner Valls	Early Cretaceous (Aptian)	Maestrat Basin	Spain	A heart urchin.	
Hypselaster strougoi	Sp. nov	Valid	Elattaar	Eocene (Lutetian)	Midawara Formation	Egypt	A heart urchin.	
Iocrinus ouzammoui	Sp. nov	In press	Botting	Late Ordovician		Morocco	A crinoid belonging to the group Disparida. Announced in 2018; the final version of the article naming it is not published yet.	
Isthloucrinus	Gen. et sp. nov	In press	Botting	Late Ordovician		Morocco	A crinoid belonging to the group Cladida. Genus includes new species I. praecursor. Announced in 2018; the final version of the article naming it is not published yet.	
Kroppocrinus garamdouaraensis	Sp. nov	Valid	Waters & Klug	Devonian (Emsian)		Morocco	A crinoid.	
Lazarechinus	Gen. et sp. nov	Valid	Hagdorn	Middle Triassic (late Anisian)	Calcaire à entroques	France	A stem-sea urchin belonging to the family Proterocidaridae. Genus includes new species L. mirabeti.	
Lillithaster	Gen. et sp. nov	Valid	Thuy, Numberger-Thuy & Jagt	Late Cretaceous (Maastrichtian)	Peedee Formation	United States (South Carolina)	A basket star belonging to the family Asteronychidae. The type species is L. lamentatiofelium.	
Linguaserra triassica	Sp. nov	Valid	Reich et al.	Late Triassic (Carnian)	Cassian Formation	Italy	A member of Ophiocistioidea belonging to the family Linguaserridae.	
Longwyaster	Gen. et sp. nov	Valid	Gale	Middle Jurassic (Bajocian)		France	A starfish belonging to the family Pterasteridae. Genus includes new species L. delsatei	
Loriolaster fragilicalceus	Sp. nov	Valid	Gladwell	Silurian (Ludlow)	Leintwardine Beds	United Kingdom	An oegophiurid brittle star.	
Lucernacrinus multispinosus	Sp. nov	Valid	Gale in Gale, Sadorf & Jagt	Late Cretaceous (Maastrichtian)	Peedee Formation	United States (North Carolina)	A crinoid belonging to the group Roveacrinida.	
Luxaster	Gen. et sp. nov	Valid	Müller et al.	Early Devonian		Germany; Luxembourg	A brittle star belonging to the family Protasteridae. Genus includes new species L. martini, as well as L. schweitzeri.	
Magnuscrinus cumberlandensis	Sp. nov	Valid	Ausich, Rhenberg & Meyer	Carboniferous (Viséan)	Fort Payne Formation	United States (Kentucky)	A crinoid belonging to the family Batocrinidae.	
Melusinaster	Gen. et 2 sp. nov	Valid	Thuy & Stöhr	Early and Middle Jurassic (Toarcian to Bajocian)		Germany; Luxembourg	A basket star. The type species is M. alissawhitegluzae; genus also includes M. arcusinimicus.	
Micraster woodi	Sp. nov	Valid	Schlüter & Wiese	Late Cretaceous (Turonian)		Germany	A sea urchin.	
Monobrachiocrinus waipapaensis	Sp. nov	Valid	Eagle, Hoskin & Hayward	Permian		New Zealand	A cladid crinoid.	
Muicrinus	Gen. et sp. nov	Valid	Lin et al.	Ordovician (latest Floian-earliest Dapingian)	Dawan Formation	China	A crinoid related to Iocrinus. The type species is M. dawanensis.	
Neoprotencrinus anyangensis	Sp. nov	Valid	Mao et al.	Permian (Asselian)	Taiyuan Formation	China	A crinoid.	
Ophioculina	Gen. et sp. nov	Valid	Rousseau & Thuy in Rousseau, Gale & Thuy	Late Jurassic (Tithonian)	Agardhfjellet Formation	Norway	A brittle star belonging to the group Ophiurina and the family Ophiopyrgidae. The type species is O. hoybergia.	
Ophiotreta sadorfi	Sp. nov	Valid	Thuy, Numberger-Thuy & Jagt	Late Cretaceous (Maastrichtian)	Peedee Formation	United States (South Carolina)	A brittle star belonging to the order Ophiacanthida and the family Ophiotomidae.	
Pachycephalocrinus	Gen. et sp. nov	Valid	Cole & Toom	Ordovician (Katian)		Estonia	A camerate crinoid belonging to the group Monobathrida. Genus includes new species P. jaanussoni.	
Pahvanticystis	Gen. et sp. nov	Valid	Lefebvre & Lerosey-Aubril	Cambrian (Guzhangian)	Weeks Formation	United States (Utah)	A solutan echinoderm. Genus includes new species P. utahensis.	
Panidiscus	Gen. et sp. nov	In press	Sumrall & Zamora	Ordovician (Katian)		Morocco	An isorophinid edrioasteroid. Genus includes new species P. tamiformis. Announced in 2018; the final version of the article naming it is not published yet.	
Peedeecrinus	Gen. et sp. nov	Valid	Gale in Gale, Sadorf & Jagt	Late Cretaceous (Maastrichtian)	Peedee Formation	United States (North Carolina)	A crinoid belonging to the group Roveacrinida. Genus includes new species P. sadorfi.	
Petalobrissus lehugueurae	Sp. nov	Valid	Alves et al.	Late Cretaceous	Jandaíra Formation	Brazil	A sea urchin belonging to the family Faujasiidae.	
Phyllobrissus garciavivesi	Sp. nov	Valid	Forner Valls	Early Cretaceous (Aptian)	Margues del Forcall Formation	Spain	A sea urchin.	
Placatenella	Gen. et comb. nov	Valid	Mooi et al.	Early Miocene	Pirabas Formation	Brazil	A sand dollar belonging to the group Scutelliformes. The type species is "Abertella" complanata Brito (1981).	
Pliotoxaster andinum	Sp. nov	Valid	Fouquet, Roney & Wilke	Early Cretaceous	Way Group	Chile	A sea urchin.	
Polarasterias	Gen. et sp. nov	Valid	Rousseau & Gale in Rousseau, Gale & Thuy	Late Jurassic (Tithonian)	Agardhfjellet Formation	Norway	A starfish belonging to the family Asteriidae. The type species is P. janusensis.	
Priscillacrinus	Gen. et sp. nov	Valid	Cole et al.	Ordovician (Katian)		Canada (Ontario)	A camerate crinoid belonging to Order Diplobathrida. Genus includes new species P. elegans.	
Prokopius	Gen. et comb. nov	Valid	Paul	Ordovician (Sandbian)		Czech Republic	A member of Diploporita belonging to the family Aristocystitidae; a new genus for "Aristocystites" sculptus Barrande (1887).	
Propteraster	Gen. et sp. nov	Valid	Gale	Late Jurassic (Oxfordian)		France	A starfish belonging to the family Pterasteridae. Genus includes new species P. amourensis	
Rautangaroa	Gen. et comb. nov	Valid	Baumiller & Fordyce	Oligocene		New Zealand	A feather star. Genus includes "Cypelometra" aotearoa Eagle (2007).	
Sacariacrinus amadei	Sp. nov	Valid	Hess & Thuy	Jurassic		France	A cyrtocrinid crinoid.	
Sagittacrinus alifer	Sp. nov	Valid	Gale	Late Cretaceous (early Campanian)		United Kingdom	A crinoid.	
Sagittacrinus longirostris	Sp. nov	Valid	Gale	Late Cretaceous (early Campanian)		United Kingdom	A crinoid.	
Sakucrinus	Gen. et sp. nov	Valid	Cole & Toom	Ordovician (Katian)		Estonia	A camerate crinoid belonging to the group Diplobathrida and the family Opsiocrinidae. Genus includes new species S. krossi.	
Sardospatangus	Gen. et 2 sp. et comb. nov	Valid	Stara, Charbonnier & Borghi	Miocene		Italy	A heart urchin. The type species is S. caschilii; genus also includes S. arburensis, as well as "Prospatangus" thieryi Lambert (1909).	
Savignaster septemtrionalis	Sp. nov	Valid	Rousseau & Gale in Rousseau, Gale & Thuy	Late Jurassic (Tithonian)	Agardhfjellet Formation	Norway	A starfish belonging to the family Pterasteridae.	
Sertulaster	Gen. et sp. nov	Valid	Blake & Koniecki	Ordovician (Katian)	Bobcaygeon Formation; Verulam Formation	Canada (Ontario)	A starfish belonging to the order Hadrosida and to the family Palaeasteridae. The type species is S. keslingi.	
Spinadiscus	Gen. et sp. nov	In press	Sumrall & Zamora	Ordovician (Katian)		Morocco	A pyrgocystid edrioasteroid. Genus includes new species S. lefebvrei. Announced in 2018; the final version of the article naming it is not published yet.	
Stegophiura miyazakii	Sp. nov	Valid	Ishida et al.	Late Cretaceous (Cenomanian)	Mifune Group	Japan	A brittle star.	
Superlininicrinus	Gen. et sp. nov	In press	Botting	Late Ordovician		Morocco	A crinoid belonging to the group Cladida. Genus includes new species S. advorsa. Announced in 2018; the final version of the article naming it is not published yet.	
Synbathocrinus chenae	Sp. nov	Valid	Mao et al.	Permian (Asselian)	Taiyuan Formation	China	A crinoid.	
Tetracrinus solidus	Sp. nov	Valid	Hess & Thuy	Jurassic		France	A cyrtocrinid crinoid.	
Thuyaster	Gen. et sp. nov	Valid	Gale	Early Jurassic (Hettangian)		Belgium	A starfish belonging to the family Korethrasteridae. Genus includes new species T. fontenoillensis	
Trombonicrinus	Gen. et sp. nov	Valid	Donovan, Waters & Pankowski	Devonian		Morocco	A crinoid. Genus includes new species T. (col.) hanshessi	
Ulocrinus qiaoi	Sp. nov	Valid	Mao et al.	Permian (Asselian)	Taiyuan Formation	China	A crinoid.	
Weitschataster	Gen. et sp. nov	Valid	Neumann & Girod	Late Cretaceous (late Campanian)		Germany	A starfish belonging to the family Goniasteridae. Genus includes new species W. intermedius.	
Westerwalddiscus	Gen. et sp. nov	Valid	Müller & Hahn	Early Devonian		Germany	A member of Edrioasteroidea belonging to the family Agelacrinitidae. Genus includes new species W. poschmanni.	
Yunnanechinus	Gen. et sp. nov	Valid	Thompson et al.	Middle Triassic (Anisian)	Guanling Formation	China	A stem-sea urchin. The type species is Y. luopingensis.	
