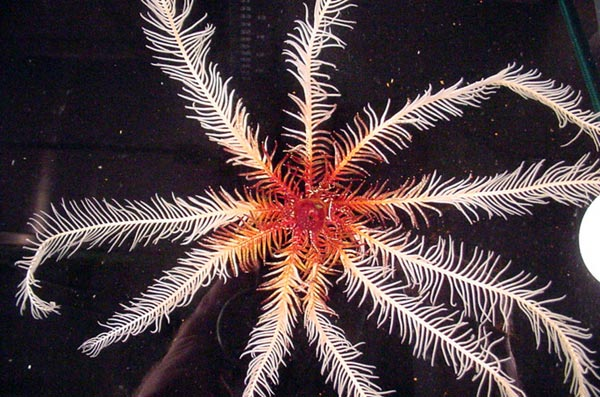
- Articulata sp.

Scientific classification
- Kingdom: Animalia
- Phylum: Echinodermata
- Class: Crinoidea
- Subclass: Pentacrinoidea; Jaekel, 1918

Parvclasses
- †Disparida; Cladida

= Pentacrinoidea =

Pentacrinoidea Temporal range: Tremadocian–recent

Subclass of marine animals from the class Crinoidea

Pentacrinoidea is a subclass of crinoids containing all members of Crinoidea except for the exclusively Paleozoic camerates (subclass Camerata). It was originally named in 1918 by Otto Jaekel, who hypothesized a fundamental split between camerate and non-camerate crinoids. Later workers doubted this interpretation, and Pentacrinoidea was rarely used during the rest of the 20th century. Recent phylogenetic work has provided strong support for Jaekel's hypothesis, and Pentacrinoidea was reinstated in a 2017 revision of crinoid systematics.

Pentacrinoidea includes most major crinoid groups, such as the living Articulata and extinct Flexibilia (together forming the parvclass Cladida) as well as the extinct Disparida. It is a stem-based taxon, defined as including all crinoids closer to Pentacrinites (a Jurassic articulate) or Apektocrinus (an Early Ordovician cladid) than to Rhodocrinites or Actinocrinites (which are camerates). Pentacrinoidea incorporates a node-based equivalent, Inadunata, which includes all descendants of the last common ancestor between Synbathocrinus (a representative disparid) and Dendrocrinus (a representative cladid).
