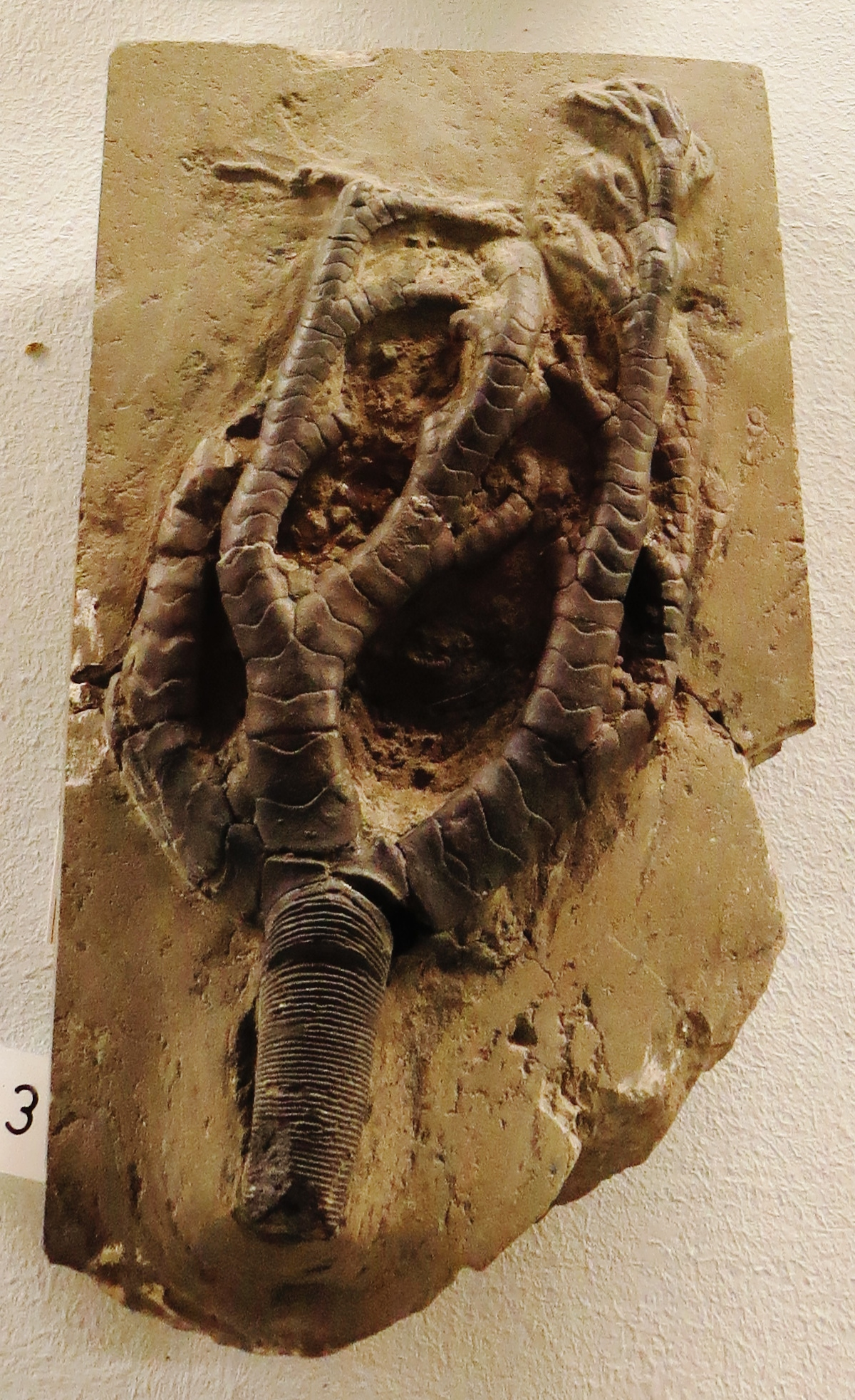
- Onychocrinus ramulosus

Scientific classification
- Kingdom: Animalia
- Phylum: Echinodermata
- Class: Crinoidea
- Parvclass: Cladida
- Superorder: †Flexibilia; Zittel, 1895

Orders
- Sagenocrinida; Taxocrinida (paraphyletic?)

= Flexibilia =

Flexibilia Temporal range: Middle Ordovician–Permian

Superorder of crinoids

Flexibilia is a superorder of specialized Paleozoic (Middle Ordovician to Permian) crinoids. They exhibited a conserved body plan and consistent suite of characteristics throughout their long history. Previously considered a subclass with unclear affinities, later investigation determined that flexibles are well-nested within Cladida, a broad group ancestral to living articulate crinoids. The Ordovician cladid Cupulocrinus acts as an intermediate form linking the generalized anatomy of other early cladids with the distinctive anatomy of flexibles, and several studies have considered it to be ancestral to the rest of the group. Although flexibles never reached the same abundance or diversity as many other crinoid groups, they remained a reliable component of crinoid faunas, particularly from the Silurian onwards. Flexible fossils are very rare in the Ordovician (the most common taxa being Cupulocrinus and Protaxocrinus), but the Late Ordovician appears to have been an interval of rapid diversification for the group.

Major traits of Flexibilia include:

- Three infrabasal plates (in contrast to the five found in other dicyclic crinoids). Two of these plates (the zygous plates) are the result of fusion, and are larger than the remaining (azygous) plate. The azygous infrabasal is almost always located under the C ray.
- 5 basal plates and 5 radial plates in the calyx. The radials typically form a straight surface for the arm bases.
- Low, flexible tegmen with large ambulacral and small interambulacral plates radiating from the mouth.
- Numerous small interradial and interbrachial plates among larger components of the calyx. Anal plates form a tube or thin linear series above the posterior basal.
- Uniserial, inward-curling arms without pinnules. The branchials are broad and connected by a patelloid suture. Branching is variable though often isotomous (symmetrical).
- Thick stem comprising thin, circular columnals without cirri.

Flexibilia is strongly supported as a monophyletic clade. It is traditionally split into the orders Sagenocrinida and Taxocrinida, though the monophyly of these orders has been called into question. The most recent discussion of Flexibilia taxonomy considers Taxocrinida to be paraphyletic and ancestral to Sagenocrinida.

== Gallery ==
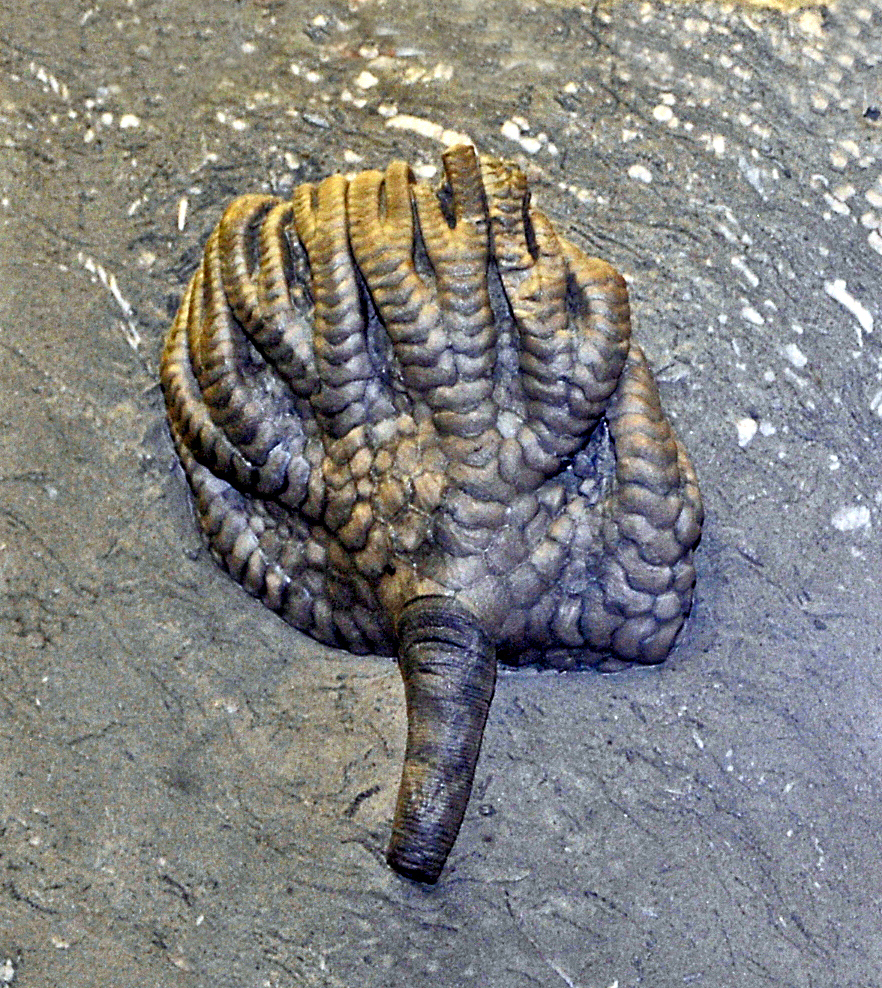
Forbesiocrinus (Carboniferous, Indiana)

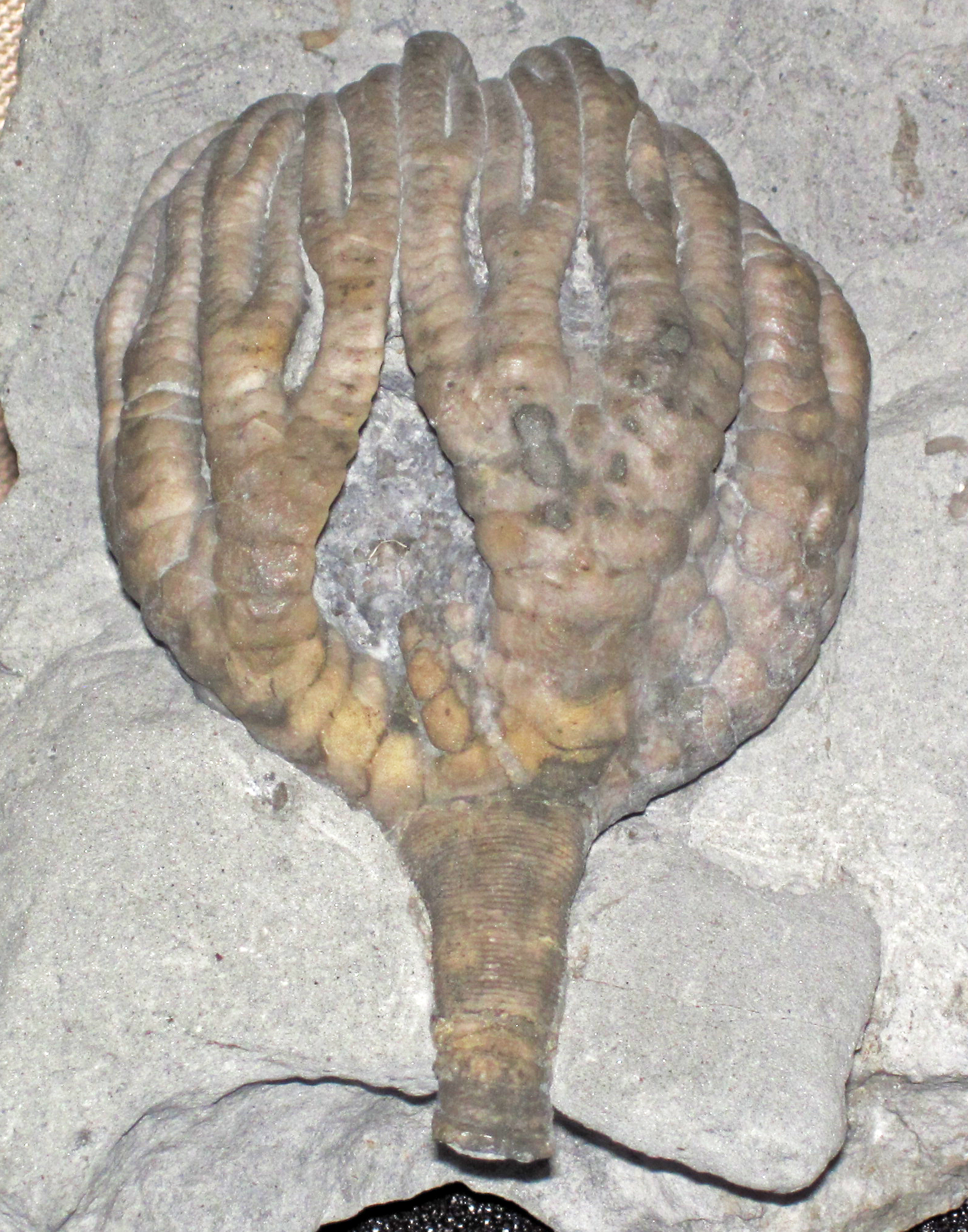
Taxocrinus (Mississippian, Indiana)

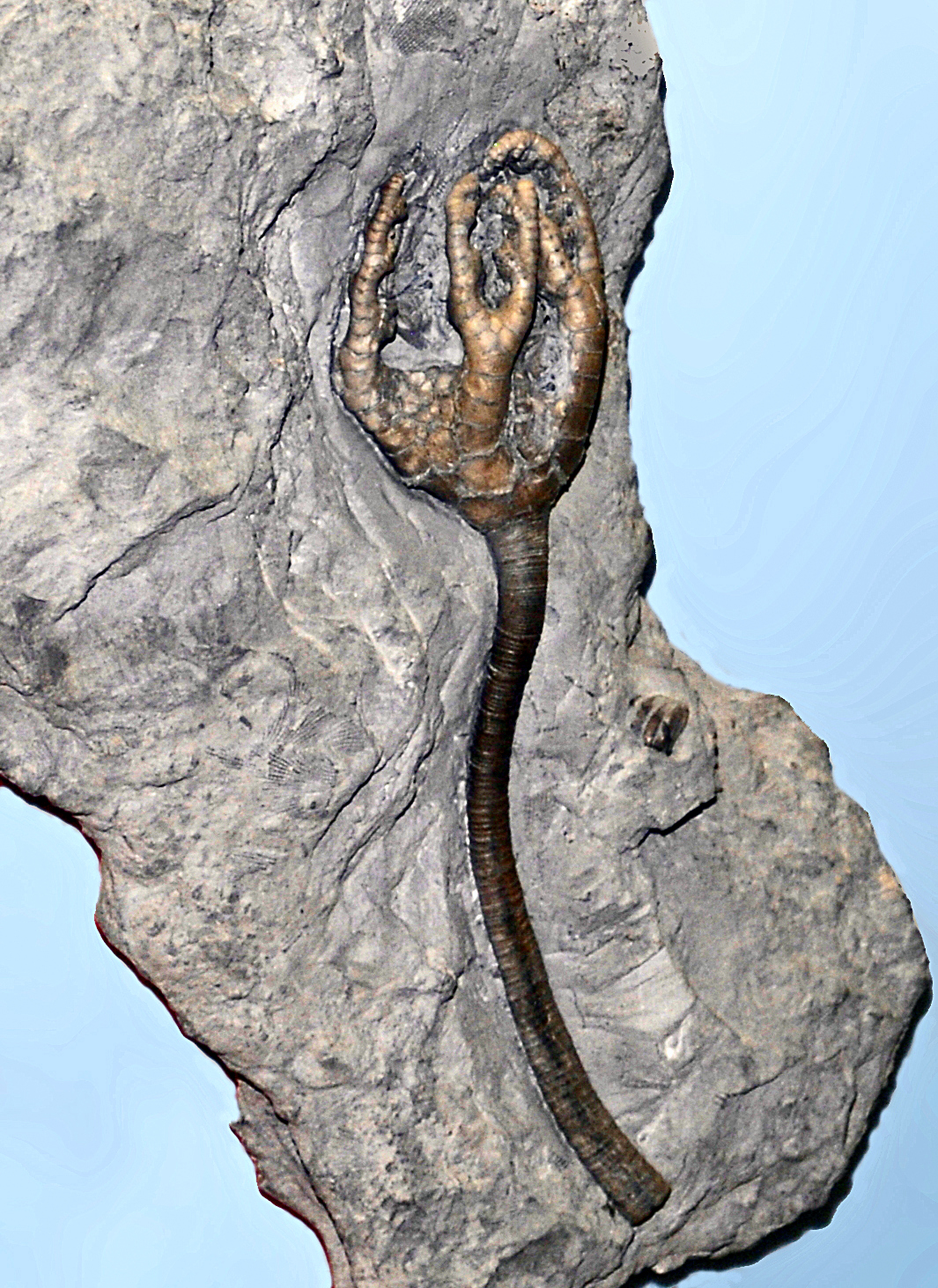
Onychocrinus (Carboniferous, United States)
