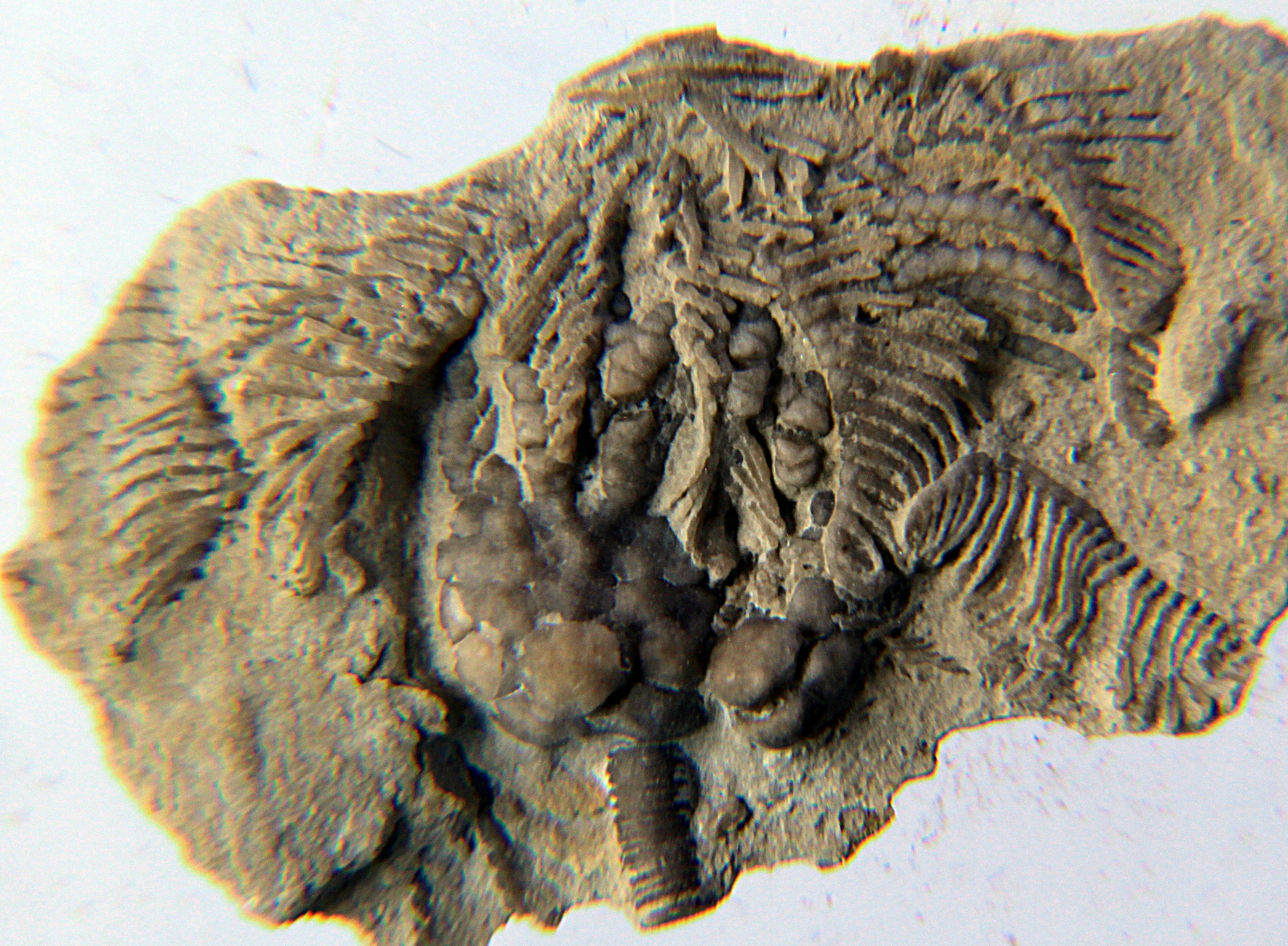
- Rhodocrinus serpens, a sea lily of the family Rhodocrinidae, 16mm measured along the stem fragment and including cup and arms, collected at the Gilmore City Formation, near Gilmore City Iowa, USA, from the Lower Mississippian Carboniferous (Tournaisian)

Scientific classification
- Kingdom: Animalia
- Phylum: Echinodermata
- Class: Crinoidea
- Subclass: †Camerata; Wachsmuth and Springer, 1885

Subgroups
- See text

= Camerata (crinoid) =

Camerata Temporal range: Middle Ordovician–Late Permian

Extinct subclass of crinoids

The Camerata or camerate crinoids are an extinct subclass of Paleozoic stalked crinoids. They were some of the earliest crinoids to originate during the Early Ordovician, reached their maximum diversity during the Mississippian, and became extinct during the Permian–Triassic extinction event. Camerates are the sister group of Pentacrinoidea, which contains all other crinoids (including living species). The two largest camerate subgroups are the orders Diplobathrida and Monobathrida.

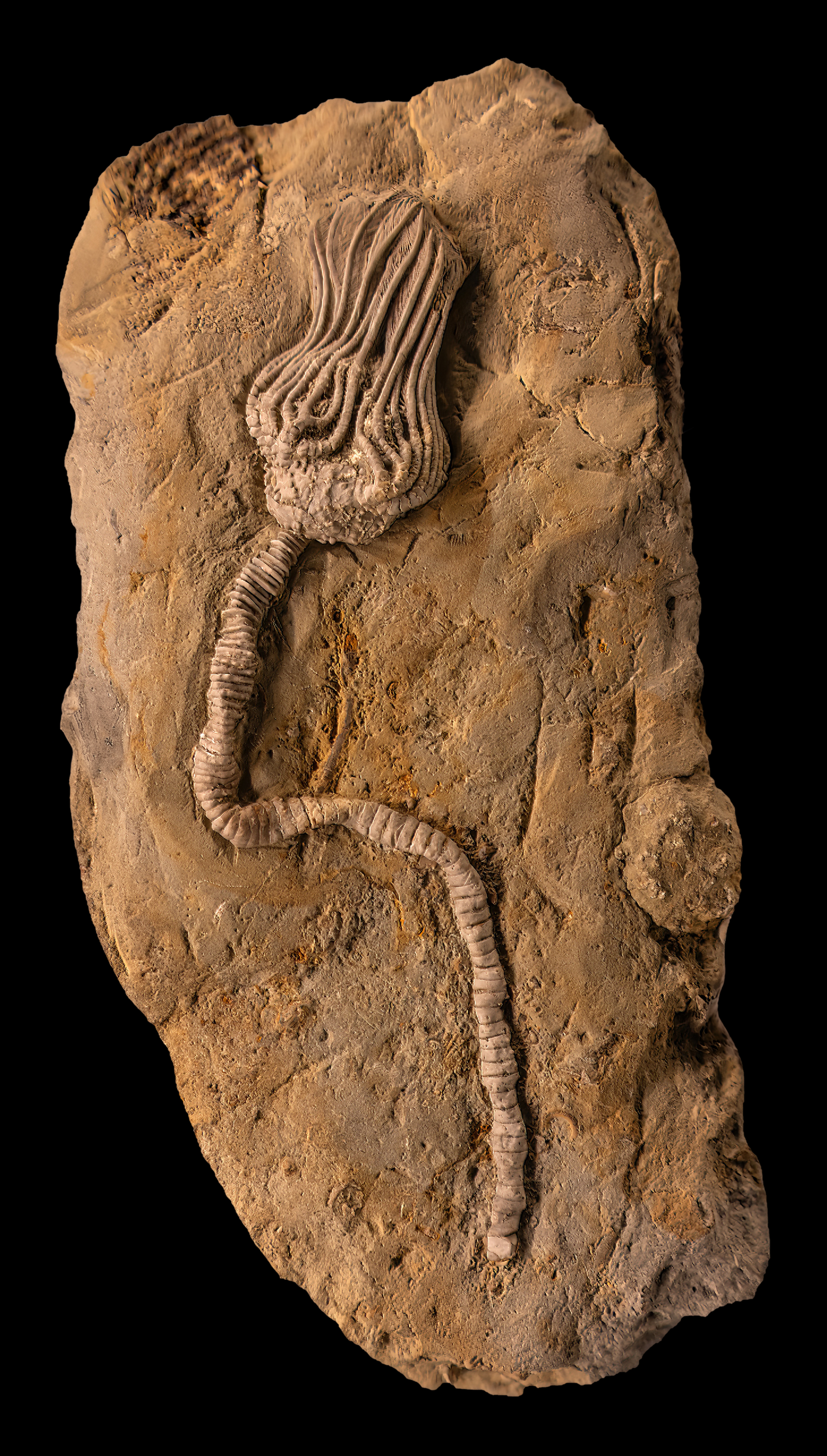
The platycrinitid Platycrinites hemisphaericus. Early Carboniferous, Muldraugh Formation, Indiana. At the Royal Tyrrell Museum of Palaeontology.

Anatomically, they are distinguished by:

- fused junctions between the plates of the cup
- brachial plates incorporated into the cup
- tegmen forming a rigid roof over the mouth
- no less than ten and sometimes a very large number of free arms, often pinnulate

== Subdivisions ==
- Order Cladida?
- Adelphicrinus
- Eknomocrinus
- Cnemecrinus
- Quechuacrinus
- Reteocrinus
- Eucamerata
  - Rosfacrinus
  - Order Diplobathrida
  - Order Monobathrida
