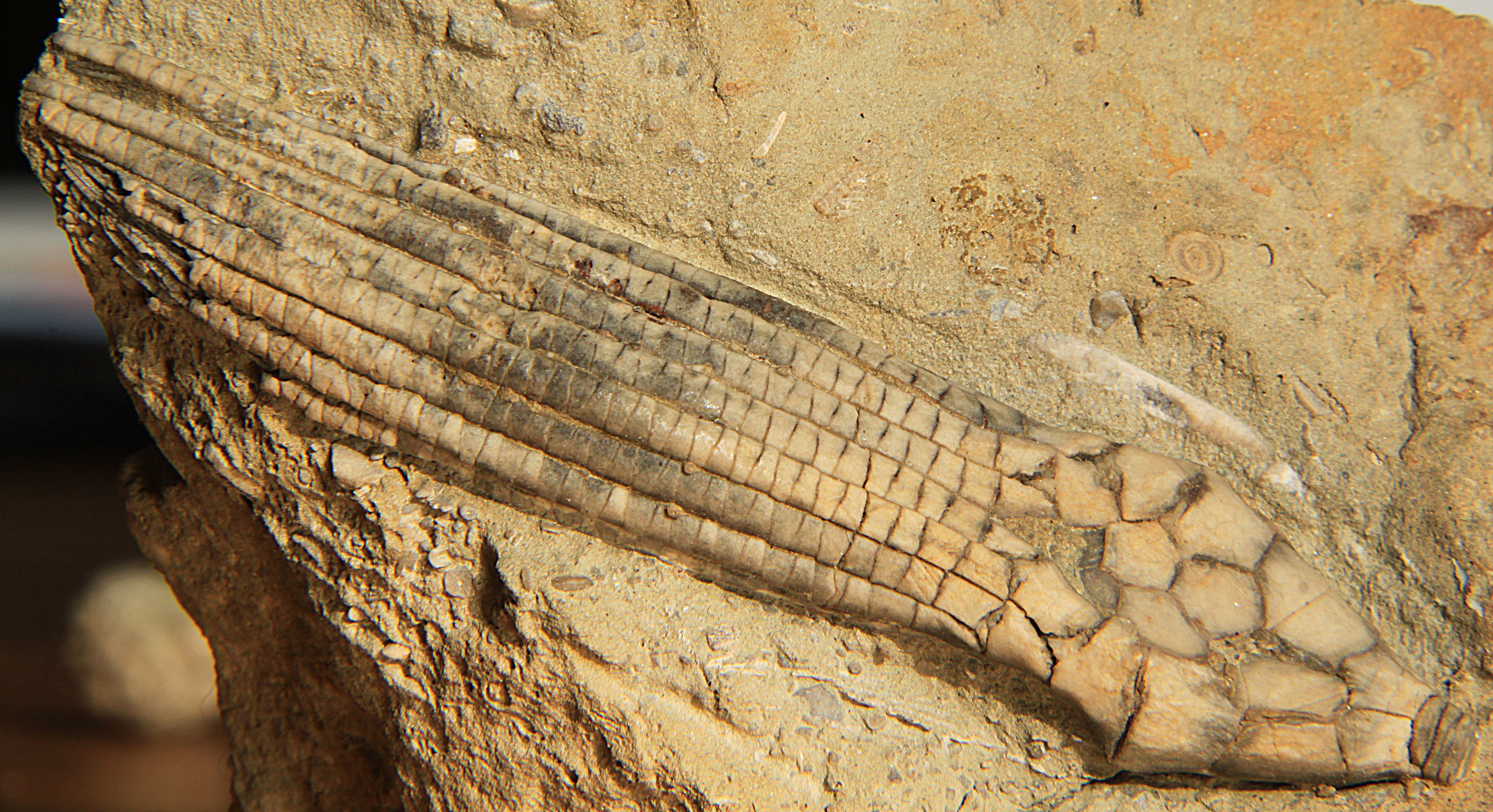
- Ulrichicrinus coryphaeus, a eucladid from the Mississippian-age Edwardsville Formation

Scientific classification
- Kingdom: Animalia
- Phylum: Echinodermata
- Class: Crinoidea
- Subclass: Pentacrinoidea
- Infraclass: Inadunata
- Parvclass: Cladida; Moore and Laudon (1943)

Subgroups
- †Porocrinoidea; †Flexibilia; Eucladida; †Ampelocrinida; †Cyathoformes; Articulata

= Cladida =

Cladida Temporal range: Ordovician–recent

Parvclass of crinoids

Cladida is a major subgroup of crinoids with a complicated taxonomic history. Cladida was originally applied to a wide assortment of extinct crinoids with a dicyclic calyx. Under this original definition, cladids would represent a paraphyletic order ancestral to several other major crinoid groups, particularly the living Articulata. More recently, Cladida has been redefined as a monophyletic parvclass of pentacrinoids which encompasses articulates and the extinct Flexibilia (flexibles). Cladids also include various minor taxa such as the hybocrinids and "cyathocrines". As flexibles were not originally considered cladids, the new subgroup Eucladida has been erected for cladids which are more derived than flexibles. Cladida is the sister group to Disparida, another large group of extinct crinoids.

== Taxonomy ==
- Parvclass Cladida
  - Superorder †Porocrinoidea
    - Order †Hybocrinida
    - Order †Porocrinida
  - Superorder †Flexibilia
    - Order †Sagenocrinida
    - Order †Taxocrinida
  - Magnorder Eucladida
    - †Ampelocrinida (incertae sedis)
    - Superorder †Cyathoformes ("primitive cladids")
      - †"Cyathocrinida"
      - †"Dendrocrinida" [in part]
      - †Poteriocrinites
    - Articuliformes ("intermediate and advanced cladids")
      - †"Poteriocrinida" [in part]
      - †"Dendrocrinida" [in part]
      - Superorder Articulata
        - Order †Encrinida
        - Order †Holocrinida
        - Order †Millericrinida
        - Order †Roveacrinida
        - Order †Uintacrinida
        - Order Comatulida
        - Order Cyrtocrinida
        - Order Hyocrinida
        - Order Isocrinida

== List of genera ==
- Aaglacrinus
- Aatocrinus
- Abrachiocrinus
- Acariaiocrinus
- Achradocrinus
- Acylocrinus
- Adinocrinus
- Aenigmocrinus
- Agassizocrinacea
- Agassizocrinoidea
- Agassizocrinus
- Aithriocrinus
- Alcimocrinus
- Allosycocrinus
- Alsopocrinus
- Ampelocrinida
- Ampheristocrinus
- Amphipsalidocrinus
- Anarchocrinus
- Anartiocrinus
- Ancyrocrinus
- Anemetocrinus
- Antihomocrinus
- Apektocrinidae
- Arachnocrinus
- Araeocrinus
- Armenocrinus
- Ascetocrinus
- Asymmetrocrinus
- Atelestocrinus
- Atractocrinus
- Atrapocrinus
- Atremacrinus
- Aulocrinus
- Aulodesocrinus
- Bactrocrinites
- Basleocrinus
- Bathericrinus
- Belanskicrinus
- Benthocrinus
- Bicidiocrinus
- Bolbocrinus
- Bollandocrinus
- Botryocrinidae
- Brabeocrinus
- Briseocrinus
- Bronaughocrinus
- Brychiocrinus
- Bursacrinus
- Cadocrinus
- Caelocrinus
- Carcinocrinus
- Carlopsocrinus
- Cathetocrinus
- Ceratocrinus
- Cercidocrinus
- Cestocrinus
- Clathrocrinus
- Clistocrinus
- Codiacrinus
- Coenocystis
- Contignatindocrinus
- Corematocrinus
- Corynecrinus
- Corythocrinus
- Cradeocrinus
- Cranocrinus
- Cricocrinus
- Cromyocrinacea
- Cromyocrinus
- Crotalocrinites
- Cryphiocrinus
- Culmicrinus
- Cyathocrinacea
- Cydrocrinus
- Cyliocrinus
- Dasciocrinus
- Denariocrinus
- Dendrocrinina
- Depaocrinus
- Derbiocrinus
- Dichostreblocrinus
- Dictenocrinus
- Dinotocrinus
- Edapocrinus
- Eifelocrinus
- Eirmocrinus
- Elicrinus
- Enallocrinus
- Eopilidiocrinus
- Epipetschoracrinus
- Eratocrinus
- Ethelocrinus
- Eucladida
- Euerisocrinus
- Eupachycrinus
- Euspirocrinus
- Exaetocrinus
- Exochocrinus
- Exoriocrinus
- Exterocrinus
- Fifeocrinus
- Flexibilia
- Follicrinus
- Forthocrinus
- Gastrocrinus
- Goniocrinus
- Gothocrinus
- Hallocrinus
- Harmostocrinus
- Harrellicrinus
- Hemiindocrinus
- Hemimollocrinus
- Hemistreptacron
- Holcocrinus
- Hosieocrinus
- Hydreionocrinus
- Hydriocrinus
- Hydroporocrinus
- Hylodecrinus
- Idaeumocrinus
- Idosocrinus
- Imitatocrinus
- Indocrinus
- Intermediacrinus
- Jahnocrinus
- Kalpidocrinus
- Kanabinocrinus
- Kansacrinus
- Kooptoonocrinus
- Kopficrinus
- Kophinocrinus
- Laccocrinus
- Lageniocrinus
- Lanecrinus
- Lasiocrinus
- Laudonocrinus
- Lebetocrinus
- Lecythocrinus
- Lekocrinus
- Linobrachiocrinus
- Linocrinus
- Lobalocrinus
- Lopadiocrinus
- Lophocrinacea
- Lophocrinus
- Malaiocrinus
- Manicrinus
- Mantikosocrinus
- Maragnicrinus
- Marathonocrinus
- Mathericrinus
- Menniscocrinus
- Metaffinocrinus
- Metasycocrinus
- Miatschkovocrinus
- Mictocrinus
- Moapocrinus
- Mollocrinus
- Monobrachiocrinus
- Mooreocrinus
- Moscovicrinus
- Myrtillocrinus
- Nacocrinus
- Nactocrinus
- Nanocrinus
- Nassoviocrinus
- Neocatacrinus
- Neolageniocrinus
- Nereocrinus
- Notiocrinus
- Nuxocrinus
- Oligobrachyocrinus
- Ophiurocrinus
- Oxynocrinus
- Pagecrinus
- Paianocrinus
- Parabotryocrinus
- Paracosmetocrinus
- Paracydonocrinus
- Paradelocrinus
- Paragraphiocrinus
- Parapernerocrinus
- Paraplasocrinus
- Parascytalocrinus
- Parastachyocrinus
- Parastephanocrinus
- Parasycocrinus
- Paratimorocidaris
- Parazeacrinites
- Parindocrinus
- Parisangulocrinus
- Parisocrinus
- Pegocrinus
- Pelecocrinus
- Pellecrinus
- Pentaramicrinus
- Pentececrinus
- Permiocrinus
- Pernerocrinus
- Petalambicrinus
- Petschoracrinus
- Phanocrinus
- Pilidiocrinus
- Pirasocrinus
- Platyfundocrinus
- Polygonocrinus
- Porocrinoidea
- Poteriocrinitina
- Premanicrinus
- Prininocrinus
- Proampelocrinus
- Probletocrinus
- Prochoidiocrinus
- Proctothylacocrinus
- Proindocrinus
- Prolobocrinus
- Psilocrinus
- Pskovicrinus
- Pulaskicrinus
- Pumilindocrinus
- Pyrenocrinus
- Ramulocrinus
- Retusocrinus
- Rhabdocrinus
- Rhadinocrinus
- Rhenocrinus
- Rhopalocrinus
- Rhopocrinus
- Rimosidocrinus
- Roemerocrinus
- Saccosompsis
- Sardinocrinus
- Sarocrinus
- Scammatocrinus
- Schedexocrinus
- Schistocrinus
- Schultzicrinus
- Scoliocrinus
- Scotiacrinus
- Sellardsicrinus
- Separocrinus
- Sigambrocrinus
- Simocrinus
- Sphaerocrinus
- Springericrinus
- Stachyocrinus
- Staphylocrinus
- Stinocrinus
- Streblocrinus
- Streptocrinus
- Sublobalocrinus
- Sycocrinites
- Syndetocrinus
- Tarachiocrinus
- Telikosocrinus
- Tenagocrinus
- Terpnocrinus
- Tetrabrachiocrinus
- Tetrapleurocrinus
- Texacrinacea
- Thalamocrinus
- Thenarocrinus
- Thetidicrinus
- Tholocrinus
- Thyridocrinus
- Timorechinus
- Treocrinus
- Trimerocrinus
- Tyrieocrinus
- Ulrichicrinus
- Ureocrinus
- Vasocrinus
- Wetherbyocrinus
- Woodocrinus
- Worthenocrinus
- Yakovlevicrinus
- Zeacrinitacea
- Zeacrinites
- Zeusocrinus
- Zostocrinus
- Zygotocrinus
