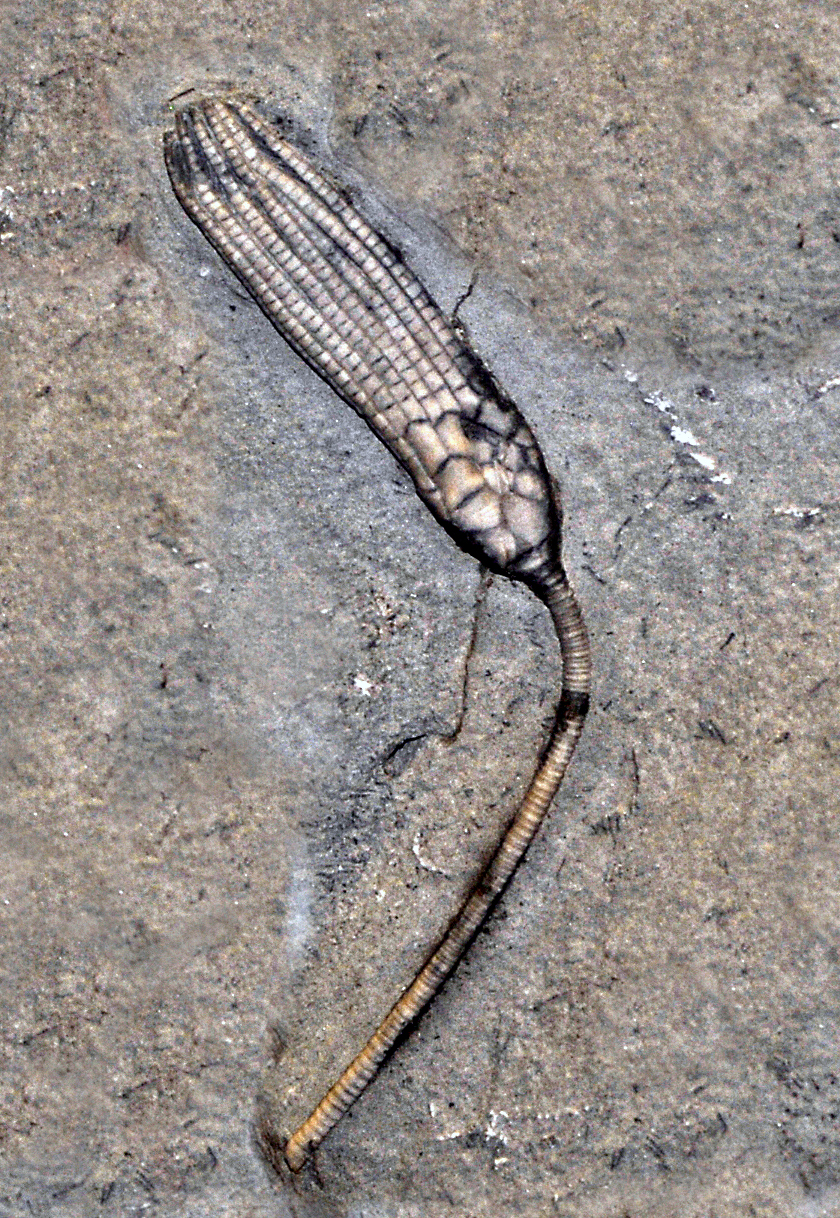
- Fossil of Ulrichicrinus from Carboniferous of United States

Scientific classification
- Kingdom: Animalia
- Phylum: Echinodermata
- Class: Crinoidea
- Parvclass: Cladida
- Genus: †Ulrichicrinus; Springer, 1926

= Ulrichicrinus =

Ulrichicrinus Temporal range: Carboniferous

Extinct genus of crinoids

Ulrichicrinus is an extinct genus of crinoids.

== Fossil records ==
This genus is known in the fossil records of the Carboniferous period of United States (age range: from 345.3 to 342.8 million years ago).
