= Aacocrinus =

Scientific classification
- Kingdom: Animalia
- Phylum: Echinodermata
- Class: Crinoidea
- Order: †Monobathrida
- Family: †Actinocrinitidae
- Genus: †Aacocrinus; Bowsher, 1955

Species
- See text

Extinct genus of crinoids

Aacocrinus is a genus of extinct sea lily from the family Actinocrinitidae.

There are currently 14 species within this genus:

- Aacocrinus acylus (Webster & Jell 1999)
- Aacocrinus algeriaensis (Webster, Maples, Sevastopulo, Frest & Waters 2004)
- Aacocrinus boonensis
- Aacocrinus chouteauensis
- Aacocrinus enigmaticus (Webster & Lane 1987)
- Aacocrinus milleri
- Aacocrinus nododorsatus (Bowsher 1955)
- Aacocrinus protuberoarmatus (Missouri)
- Aacocrinus sampsoni
- Aacocrinus senectus
- Aacocrinus spinosulus
- Aacocrinus spinulosus
- Aacocrinus tetradactylus (Missouri)
- Aacocrinus triarmatus
