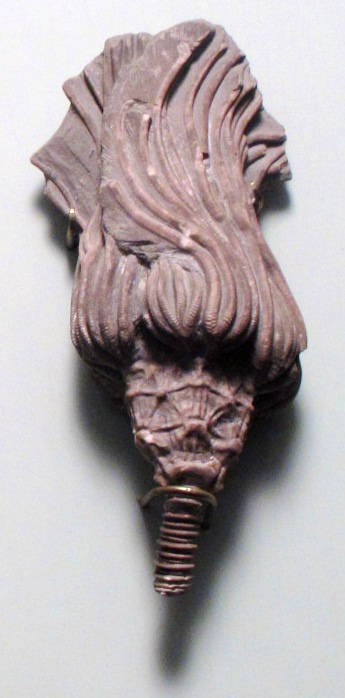
- Actinocrinus from Indiana, on display at Smithsonian Museum of Natural History

Scientific classification
- Kingdom: Animalia
- Phylum: Echinodermata
- Class: Crinoidea
- Order: †Monobathrida
- Genus: †Actinocrinus

= Actinocrinus =

Actinocrinus Temporal range: Early Carboniferous

Extinct genus of crinoids

Actinocrinus is an extinct genus of crinoid from the Early Carboniferous of Europe and North America. It belongs to the family Actinocrinidæ.
