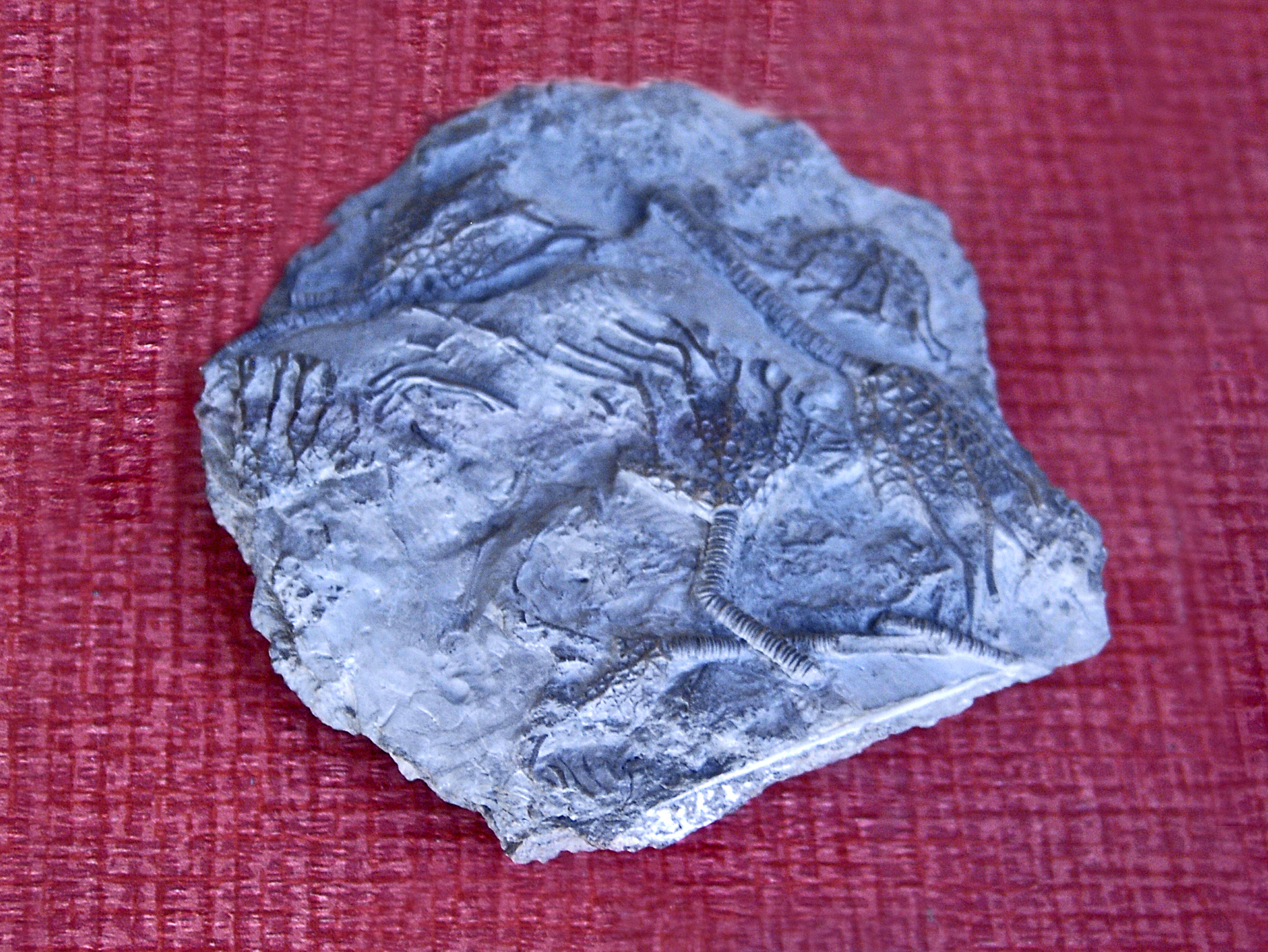
- Fossil specimen of Glyptocrinus decadactylus from United States, on display at Galerie de paléontologie et d'anatomie comparée in Paris

Scientific classification
- Kingdom: Animalia
- Phylum: Echinodermata
- Class: Crinoidea
- Order: †Monobathrida
- Family: †Glyptocrinidae
- Genus: †Glyptocrinus; Hall, 1847

= Glyptocrinus =

Glyptocrinus Temporal range: Middle Ordovician - Early Silurian

Extinct genus of crinoids

Glyptocrinus is an extinct genus of sea lily that lived from the Middle Ordovician to the Early Silurian (471.8 - 436.0 Ma). Its remains have been found in North America.
