= Reteocrinus =

Reteocrinus Temporal range: Middle Ordovician - Late Ordovician

Scientific classification
- Kingdom: Animalia
- Phylum: Echinodermata
- Class: Crinoidea
- Order: †Diplobathrida
- Family: †Reteocrinidae
- Genus: †Reteocrinus; Billings, 1859

Extinct genus of crinoids

Reteocrinus is an extinct genus of sea lily that lived in the Middle to Late Ordovician. Its remains have been found in North America.

== Sources ==
- Reteocrinus in the Field Museum's Evolving Planet
