= Alphacrinus =

Alphacrinus Temporal range: Ibexian

Scientific classification
- Kingdom: Animalia
- Phylum: Echinodermata
- Class: Crinoidea
- Parvclass: †Disparida
- Family: †Alphacrinidae; Guensburg, 2010
- Genus: †Alphacrinus; Guensburg, 2010
- Species: †A. mansfieldi

Binomial name
- †Alphacrinus mansfieldi Guensburg, 2010

Extinct genus of crinoids

Alphacrinus is an extinct genus of crinoids which existed during the early Ibexian period. It was named by Thomas E. Guensburg in 2010, and placed into its own family, Alphacrinidae. The type species is Alphacrinus mansfieldi.
