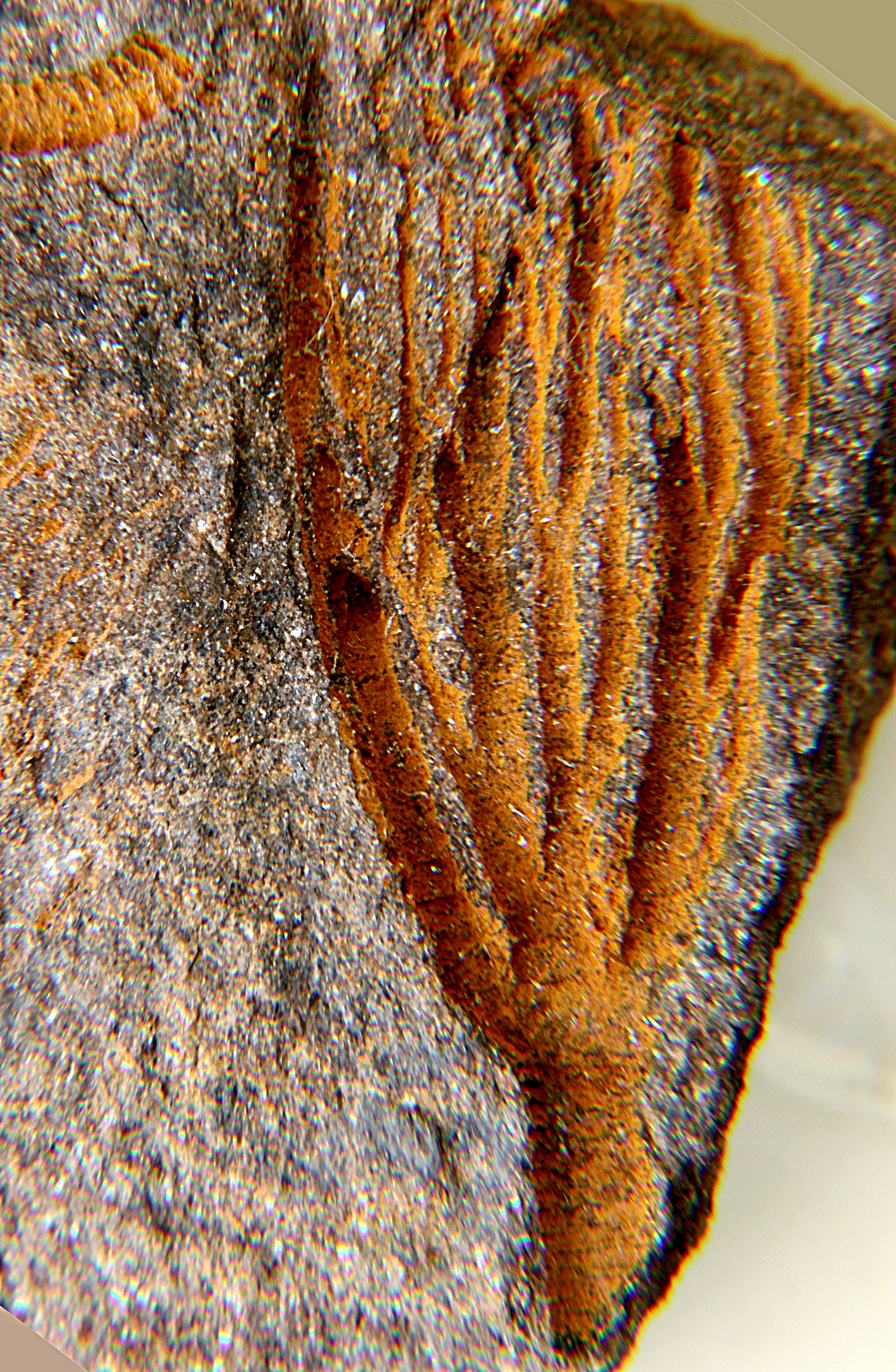
- Caleidocrinus multiramus, 26mm

Scientific classification
- Kingdom: Animalia
- Phylum: Echinodermata
- Class: Crinoidea
- Parvclass: †Disparida
- Family: †Iocrinidae
- Genus: †Caleidocrinus; Waagen & Jahn, 1899

Species
- Caleidocrinus multiramus Barrande, 1899 (type) = C. barrandei; Caleidocrinus turgidulus Ramsbottom, 1961

= Caleidocrinus =

Caleidocrinus Temporal range: Middle and early Upper Ordovician

Extinct genus of crinoids

Caleidocrinus is a genus of sea lily that lived during the Middle and early Upper Ordovician in what is now the Czech Republic and Wales.
