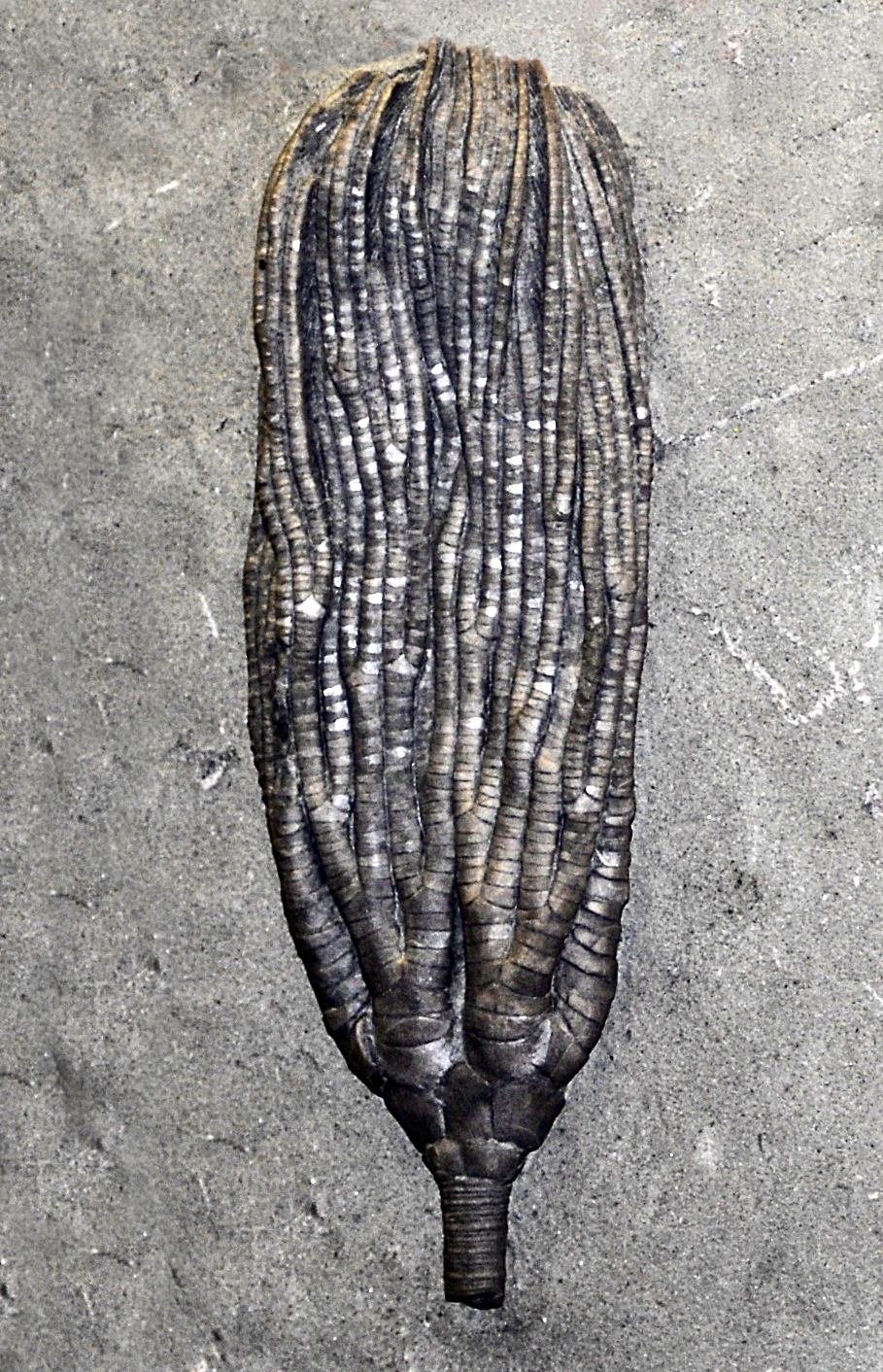
- Fossil of Cydrocrinus from Carboniferous of United States

Scientific classification
- Kingdom: Animalia
- Phylum: Echinodermata
- Class: Crinoidea
- Parvclass: Cladida
- Genus: †Cydrocrinus; Kirk, 1940

= Cydrocrinus =

Cydrocrinus Temporal range: Carboniferous

Extinct genus of crinoids

Cydrocrinus is an extinct genus of crinoids.

== Fossil record ==
This genus is known in the fossil record of the Carboniferous period of United States (age range: 345.3 to 342.8 million years ago).
