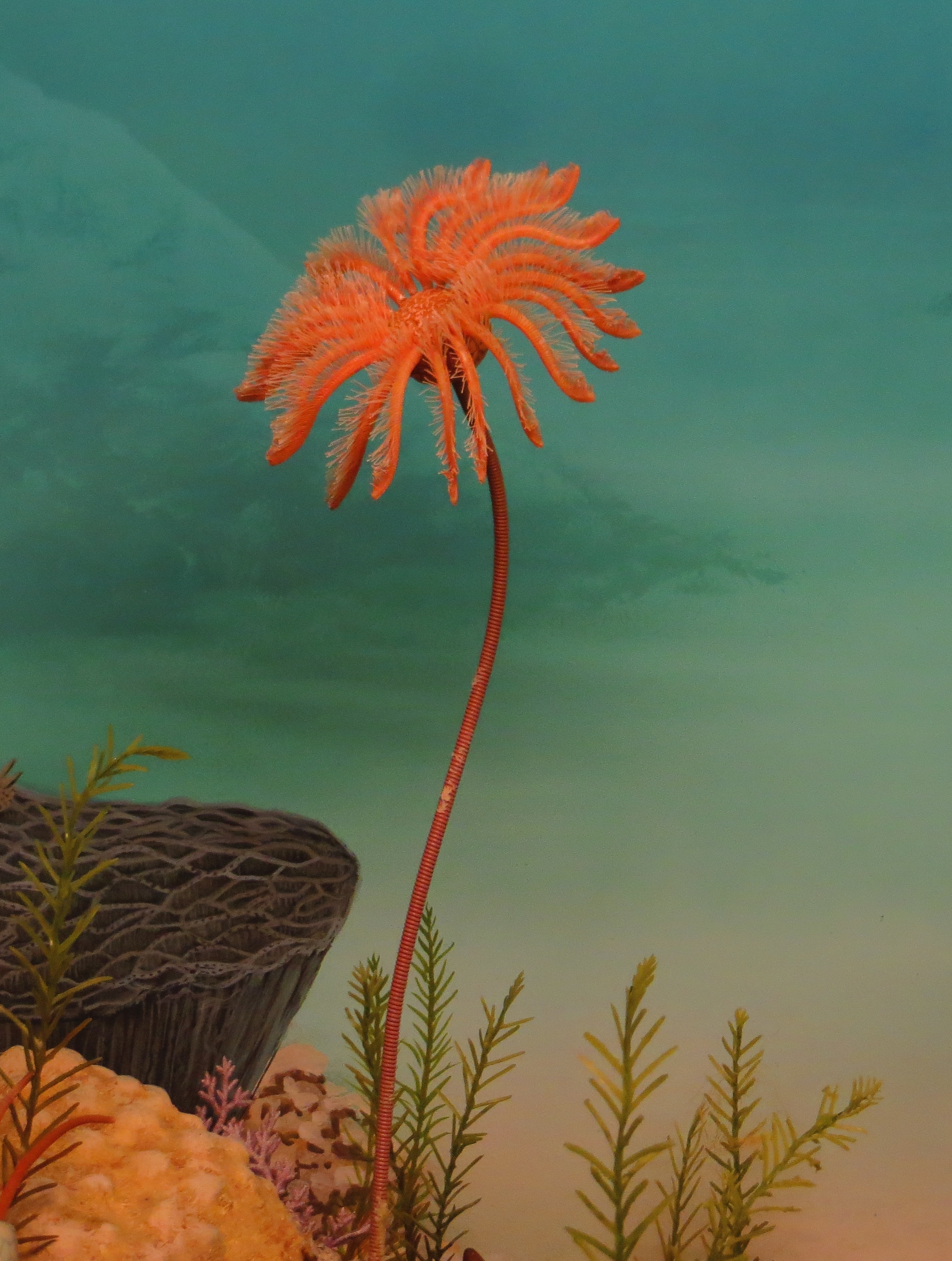
- Marsupiocrinus model

Scientific classification
- Kingdom: Animalia
- Phylum: Echinodermata
- Class: Crinoidea
- Order: †Monobathrida
- Family: †Marsupiocrinidae
- Genus: †Marsupiocrinus; Morris, 1843

= Marsupiocrinus =

Marsupiocrinus Temporal range: Silurian–Early Devonian

Extinct genus of crinoids

Marsupiocrinus is an extinct genus of crinoids that lived from the Silurian to the Early Devonian in North America.
