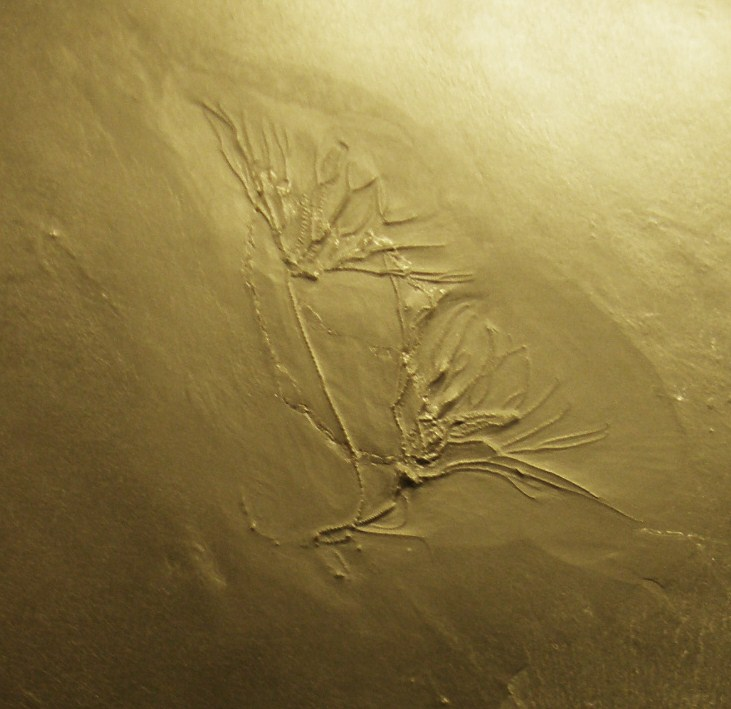
- Parisangulocrinus zeaeformis

Scientific classification
- Kingdom: Animalia
- Phylum: Echinodermata
- Class: Crinoidea
- Parvclass: Cladida
- Genus: †Parisangulocrinus

= Parisangulocrinus =

Parisangulocrinus Temporal range: Early Devonian

Extinct genus of crinoids

Parisangulocrinus is an extinct genus of crinoids from the Early Devonian of Europe.
