= Aaglacrinus =

Aaglacrinus Temporal range: 359.2–299.0 Ma Carboniferous

Scientific classification
- Kingdom: Animalia
- Phylum: Echinodermata
- Class: Crinoidea
- Order: Cladida
- Family: Dendrocrinidae
- Genus: Aaglacrinus G. D. Webster, 1981

Species
- See text

Synonyms
- Aaglaocrinus

Extinct genus of crinoids

Aaglacrinus is an extinct genus of crinoidea in the Cladida order. It has been proposed that it was a stationary (attached) suspension feeder the hard parts of which were composed of magnesium calcite.

== Species ==
There are currently two species in this genus, both of which are under the name Aaglaocrinus:

- Aaglaocrinus bowsheri (Webster & Kues, 2006)
- Aaglaocrinus sphaeri (Strimple 1949)
