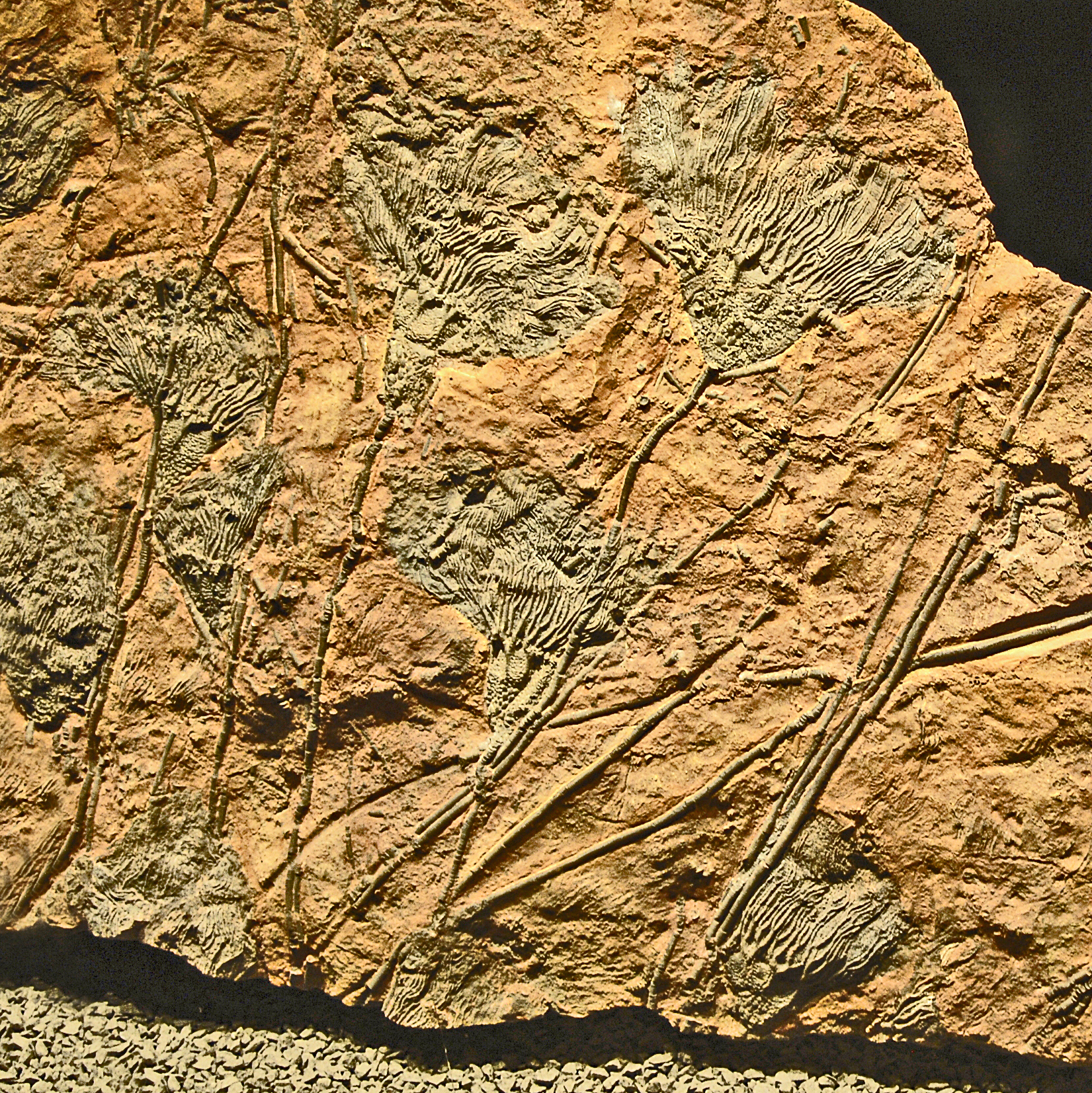
- Scyphocrinus elegans from Morocco. Lower Devonian (410 Ma)

Scientific classification
- Kingdom: Animalia
- Phylum: Echinodermata
- Class: Crinoidea
- Order: †Monobathrida
- Genus: †Scyphocrinus; Zenker

Synonyms
- Camarocrinus

= Scyphocrinus =

Scyphocrinus Temporal range: Silurian to Devonian

Extinct genus of crinoids

Scyphocrinus, is an extinct genus of crinoids. Species belonging to this genus lived during the Silurian and Devonian periods (from 443.4 to 358.9 Ma).

The crinoid genus Camarocrinus have been considered by some authors the bulbous distal end of the stem of Scyphocrinus, having the function of a root and fixing the crinoid to the sea button.

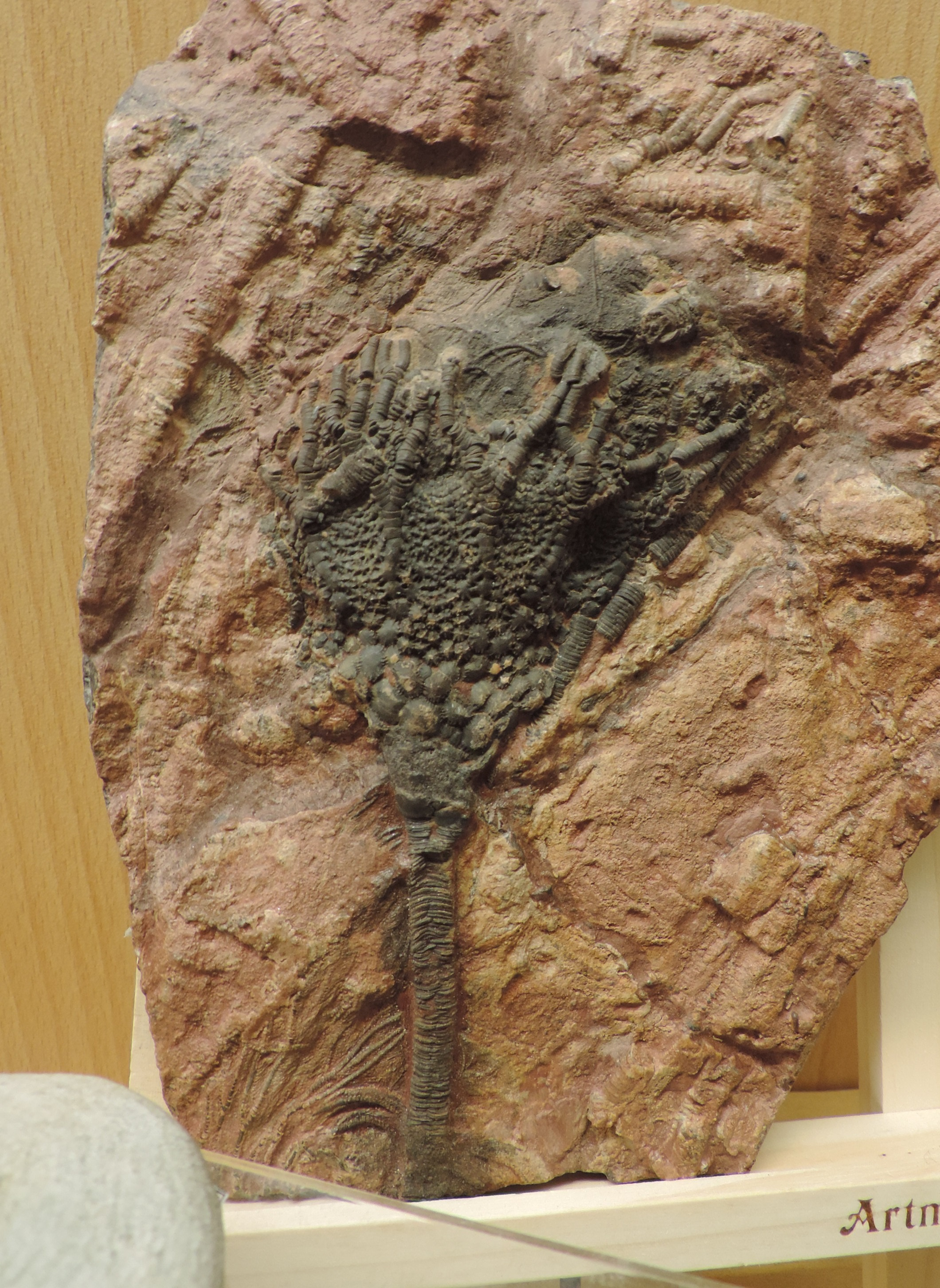
Fossil of Scyphocrinites from Silurian, found in Morocco.

== Species ==
- Scyphocrinus elegans Zenker, 1833

== See also ==
- List of prehistoric echinoderms
- Paleobiology Database
- Sepkoski, Jack phylum Echinodermata
- Stephen K. Donovan and David N. Lewis The mid-Palaeozoic camerate crinoid Scyphocrinites Zenker in southwest England
