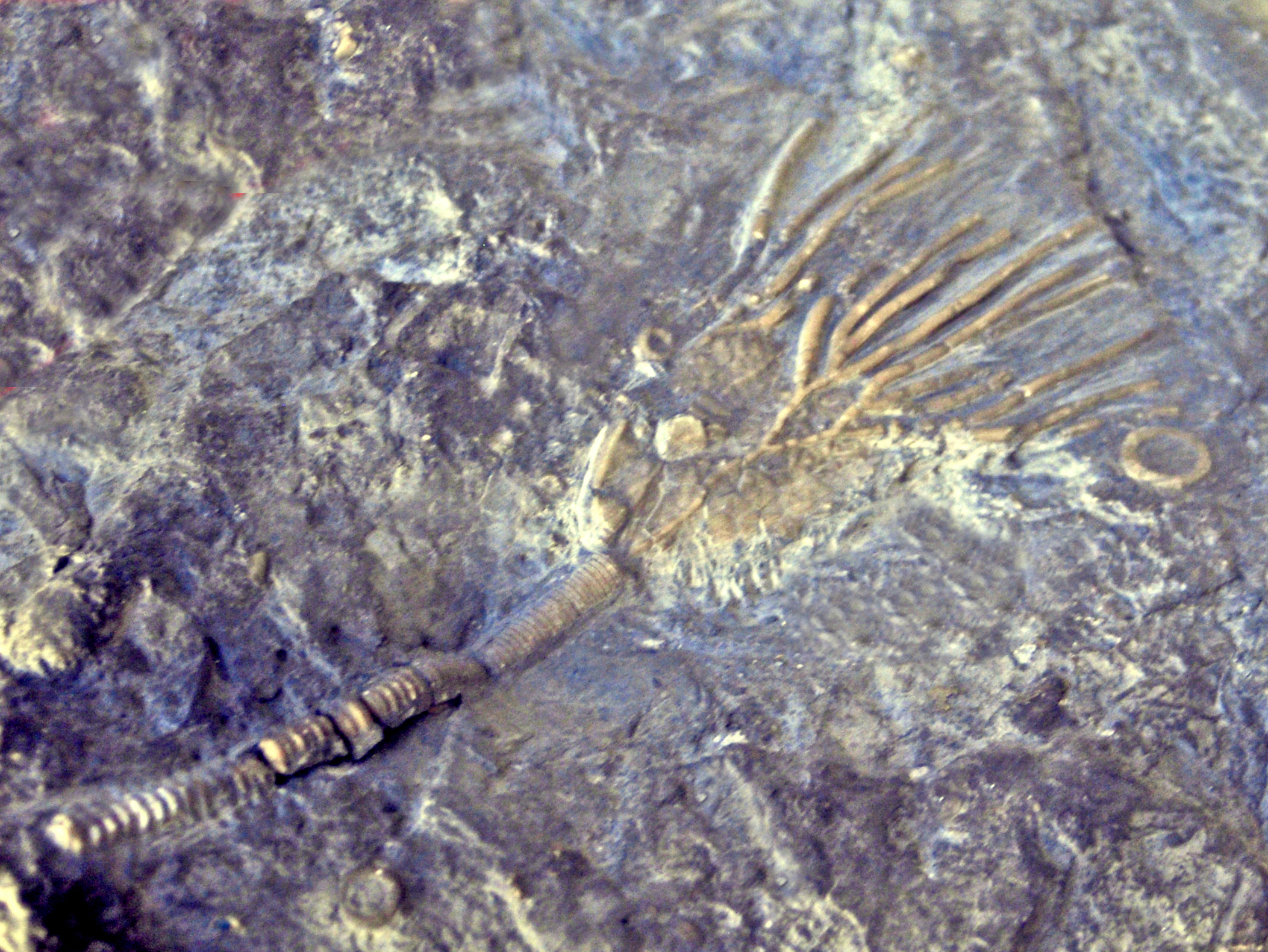
- Fossil specimen of Periechocrinus costatus from United Kingdom, on display at Galerie de paléontologie et d'anatomie comparée in Paris

Scientific classification
- Kingdom: Animalia
- Phylum: Echinodermata
- Class: Crinoidea
- Order: †Monobathrida
- Family: †Periechocrinidae
- Genus: †Periechocrinus; Morris, 1843

Synonyms
- Periechocrinites

= Periechocrinus =

Periechocrinus Temporal range: Silurian–Carboniferous

Extinct genus of crinoids

Periechocrinus is an extinct genus of crinoids belonging to the order Monobathrida, family Periechecrinidae.

These stationary upper-level epifaunal suspension feeders lived during the Carboniferous period and the Mississippian age of Australia, as well as in the Silurian of Canada, Czech Republic, United Kingdom and United States, from 436.0 to 345.3 Ma.

== Species ==
- Periechocrinus costatus (Austin and Austin)
- Periechocrinus indicator Etheridge Jr. 1892

== Description ==
Periechocrinus species were about 30 centimetres (12 in) high.
