= Charles Wachsmuth =

American paleontologist (1829–1896)

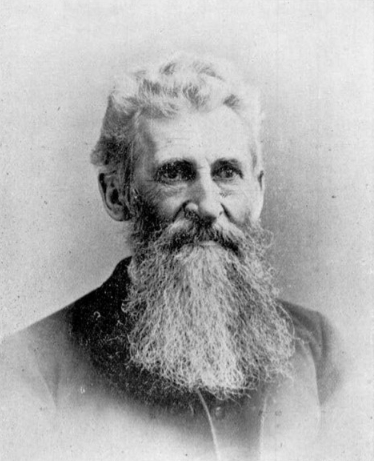
- Born: September 13, 1829; Kingdom of Hanover
- Died: February 7, 1896 (aged 66)
- Known for: Crinoid fossils
- Scientific career
- Fields: Paleontology
- Institutions: Museum of Comparative Zoology, Harvard University

Charles Wachsmuth (September 13, 1829 – February 7, 1896) was a German-American paleontologist and businessman. After emigrating to the United States, he became a renowned expert on the Paleozoic fossil animals known as crinoids. He and his collaborator, Frank Springer, published numerous articles on the subject and built an exceptional collection of crinoid fossils. The culmination of his work was the two-volume "Monograph of the North American Crinoidea Camerata", coauthored with Springer and published posthumously in 1897.

== Early life ==
Wachsmuth was born on September 13, 1829, in Hanover, Germany. His father, Christian Wachsmuth, was a lawyer and member of the Frankfurt parliament who intended his son to follow him in the legal profession. However, ill health forced Charles to leave school at age sixteen. His physician recommended a career in business. In 1852, he emigrated to the United States and worked in New York as an agent for a Hamburg shipping firm until 1854.

The climate in New York did not agree with Wachsmuth and after recovering from a severe attack of pneumonia he moved west in 1855 and settled in Burlington, Iowa. That same year he married Bernandina Lorenz and opened a grocery store.

== Paleontology ==
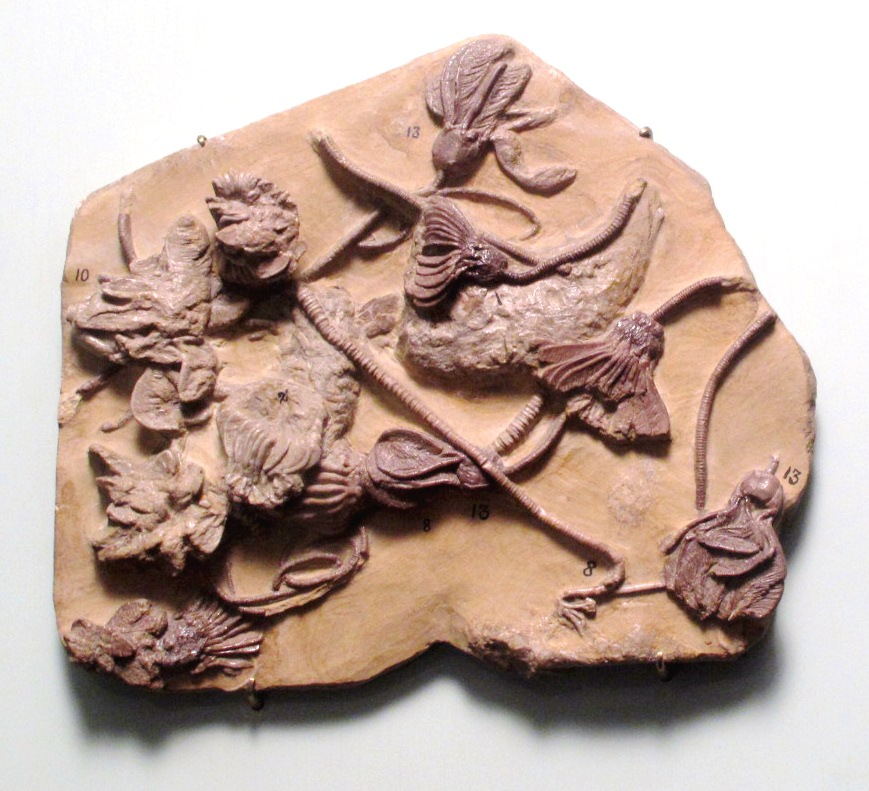
Crinoid fossils from Iowa

Poor health continued to plague Wachsmuth. His doctor recommended outdoor exercise and suggested fossil hunting as a pleasant and healthy pastime. Wachsmuth soon found that the local limestone formations held an extensive array of the Paleozoic fossil animals known as crinoids. Eventually, the region would be recognized as one of the world's richest sources of these fossils.

Wachsmuth became an enthusiastic collector and student of crinoid fossils. His health finally improved and he turned over the operation of his business to his wife so that he could devote all his time to his new passion. Over the next few years, the collection grew to the point where it began to attract the attention of scientists across the country. Geologists Amos Worthen and Fielding Meek borrowed specimens while preparing their geological survey of Illinois. In 1864, Louis Agassiz came to Burlington to meet Wachsmuth and view his collection.

By 1865, the grocery business had made Wachsmuth financially independent. He and his wife traveled first to Cambridge, Massachusetts, to visit Agassiz and the Museum of Comparative Zoology. Next, the Wachsmuths continued on to Europe where they examined museum collections and collected fossils to take home. His last stop was the British Museum in London where he was pleased to learn that the reputation of his collection in Burlington had preceded him.

When Wachsmuth returned to Burlington in 1866, he devoted all his energies to the continued collection and study of crinoid fossils. In 1866 he coauthored his first paper with Agassiz student William H. Niles, showing that the Burlington formation was actually composed of two geological horizons. At this time, Wachsmuth preferred to focus on research and let others publish.

In 1869, Frank Springer, a young attorney, began to practice law in Burlington. Springer had studied natural history at the University of Iowa but decided that law was a more practical career. In Burlington, he soon made friends with Wachsmuth and joined him in the collection and study of crinoids. In 1872, Springer moved his law practice to New Mexico but continued to collaborate with Wachsmuth and returned to Burlington whenever possible.

In 1872, Agassiz visited Burlington again and was impressed by the growth of the collection and the quality of the fossils. He purchased the collection for $6,000 and hired Wachsmuth to take charge of the entire crinoid assemblage at Harvard's Museum of Comparative Zoology. Agassiz encouraged Wachsmuth to study the literature on crinoids and publish his own findings. Wachsmuth held this position until Agassiz's death in December, 1873.

Wachsmuth traveled to Europe and Asia in 1874, bringing with him a small collection of crinoid fossils which he sold to the British Museum for £80. He returned to Burlington the same year and set out to build another, even larger collection of fossils.

With the help of his wife and Frank Springer, the new collection of crinoids soon rivaled any in the world. Because of his health, Wachsmuth spent winters collecting fossils in the warmer climate of the American South. Springer traveled to Europe and brought back an extensive selection of fossils from England, France, Russia, and Bohemia. Other fossils from around the world were purchased or acquired in trade. Wachsmuth built a special, fireproof museum behind his home to store the fossils. In addition a comprehensive library of crinoid literature was gathered.

Wachsmuth and Springer published their findings in a variety of scientific journals. They were not interested in naming and describing new species but instead concentrated on issues of morphology and classification. The culmination of their work was the two-volume "Monograph of the North American Crinoidea Camerata" (1897), published by the Museum of Comparative Zoology after Wachsmuth’s death. This work fundamentally revised contemporary crinoid taxonomy.

After a period of declining health, Wachsmuth died on February 7, 1896. Springer maintained the museum and library in Burlington for another fifteen years and then donated the collection to the Smithsonian.

Wachsmuth was a member of the American Association for the Advancement of Science, the Geological Society of America, the Iowa Academy of Science, the Imperial Society of Natural Sciences of Moscow, and corresponding member of the Philadelphia Academy of Science.

== Works ==
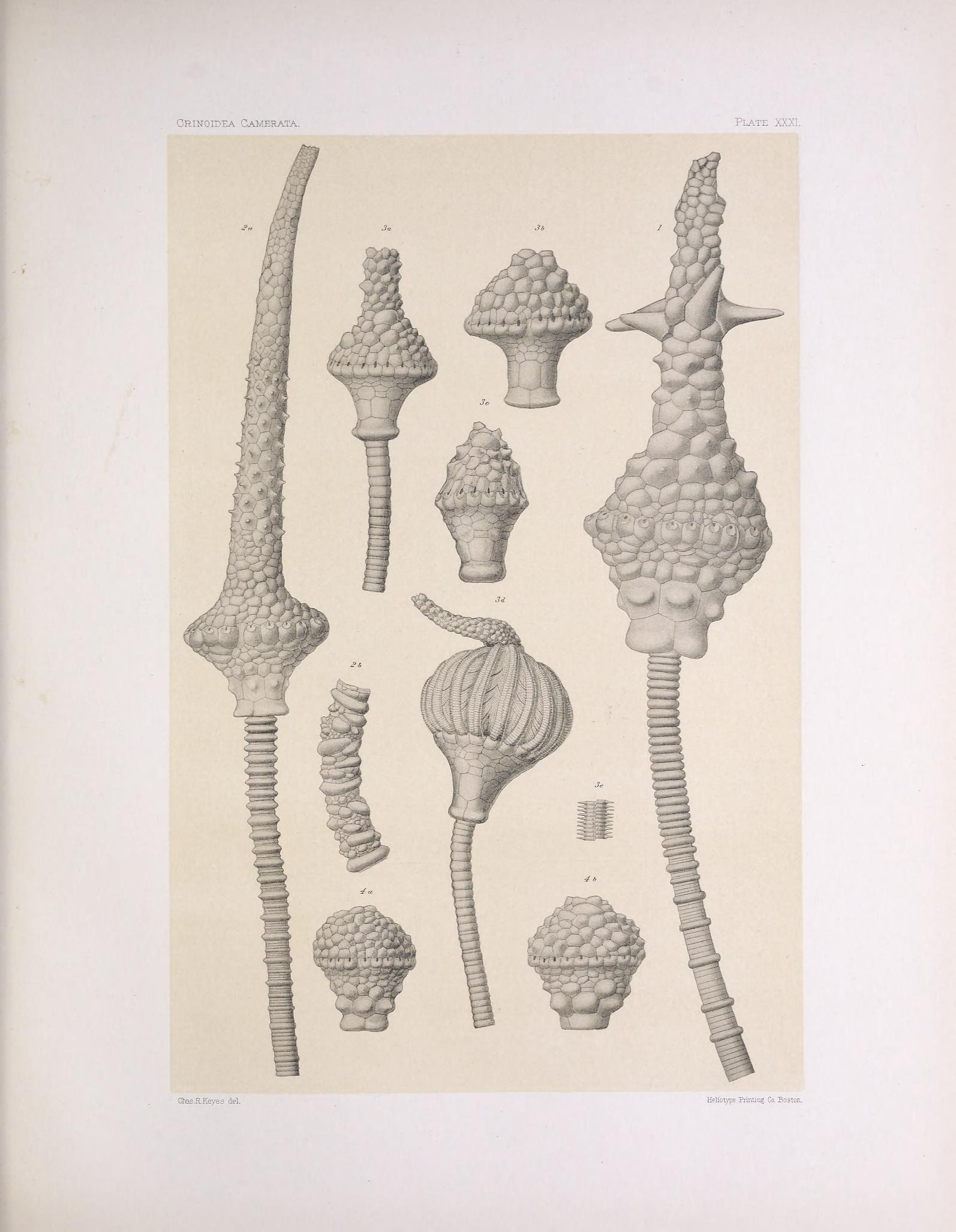
Plate XXXI from The North American Crinoidea camerata, Springer, Frank; Wachsmuth, Charles.

Wachsmuth contributed to a variety of regional and national scientific journals, often with Springer as his coauthor.

- 1866. Evidence of two distinct geological formations in the Burlington limestone (with Niles)
- 1877. Notes on the internal and external structure of Paleozoic crinoids
- 1877. Revision of the genus Belemnocrinus and description of two new species (with Springer)
- 1878. Transition Forms in Crinoids (with Springer)
- 1879-1886. "Revision of the Palaeocrinoidea" (with Springer)
- 1897. "Monograph of the North American Crinoidea Camerata" 2 vol. (posthumously, with Springer)

== Sources ==
- Bather, Francis Arthur (1896). "Obituary. Charles Wachsmuth". Geological Magazine. 33: 189–192. doi:10.1017/s001675680013078x.
- Caffey, David L. (2006). Frank Springer and New Mexico. Texas A&M University Press. pp. 98–111. ISBN 1585444642.
- Goldstein, Daniel (1999). "Wachsmuth, Charles". In Garraty, John A. (ed.). American National Biography. Oxford University Press. doi:10.1093/anb/9780198606697.article.1301731.
- Keyes, Charles Rollin (1896). "An Epoch in the History of American Science". Annals of Iowa. 2 (5): 345–364. doi:10.17077/0003-4827.2084.
- "Memorial of Charles Wachsmuth". Proceedings of the Iowa Academy of Science. 4 (1): 13–16. 1896.
- Biographical Review of Des Moines County, Iowa. Chicago: Hobart Publishing Company. 1905. pp. 159–160.
