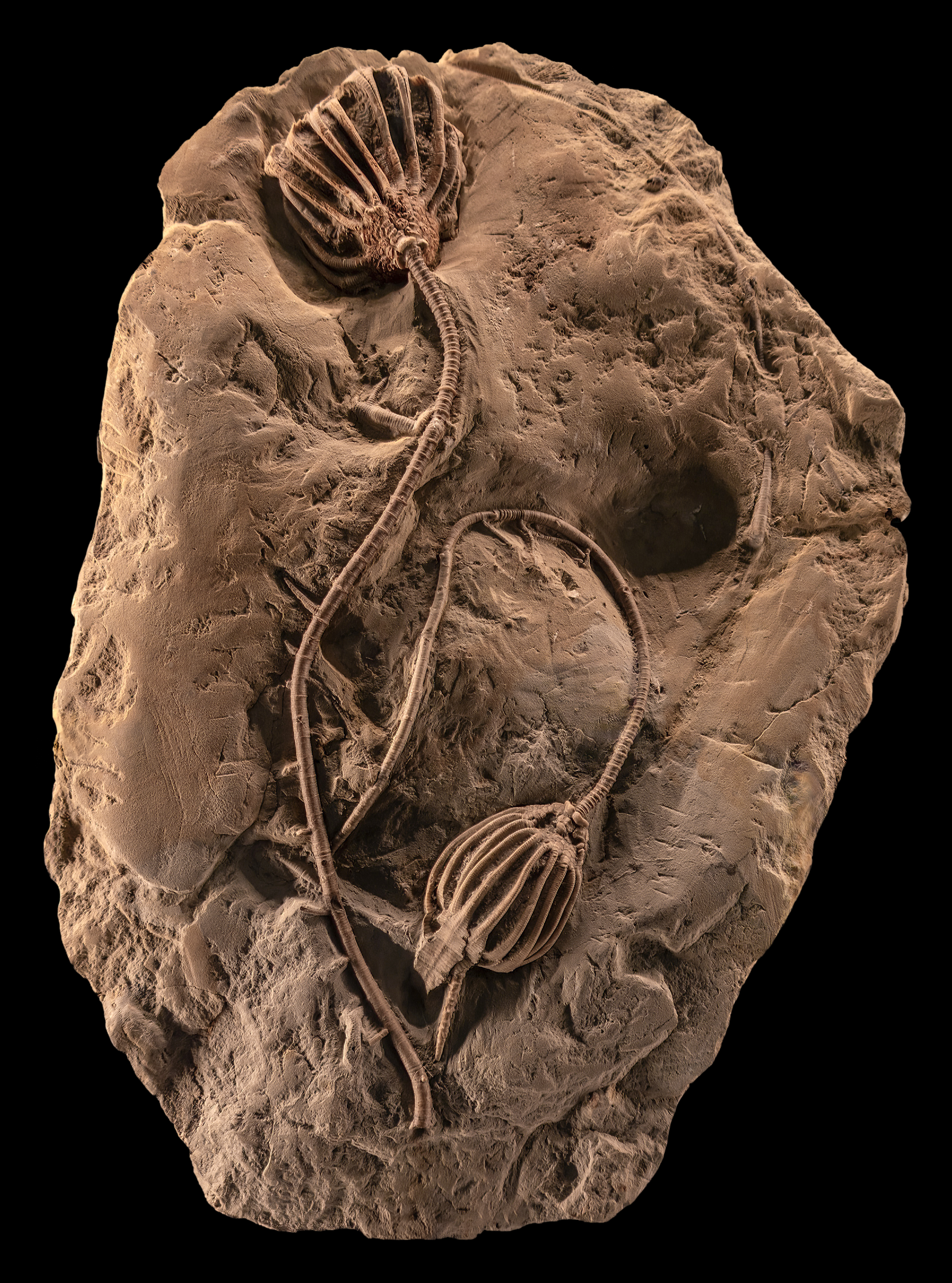
- Fossil of Forbesiocrinus multibrachiatus from Carboniferous of Indiana (U.S.A.)

Scientific classification
- Kingdom: Animalia
- Phylum: Echinodermata
- Class: Crinoidea
- Order: †Sagenocrinida
- Family: †Sagenocrinitidae
- Genus: †Forbesiocrinus; Koninck and Le Hon, 1854

= Forbesiocrinus =

Forbesiocrinus Temporal range: Devonian - Carboniferous

Extinct genus of crinoids

Forbesiocrinus is an extinct genus of crinoids.

== Fossil records ==
This genus is known in the fossil records from the Devonian period to the Carboniferous period (age range: 370.6 to 342.8 million years ago). Fossils of species within this genus have been found in Belgium, Canada, United States, Australia and China.
