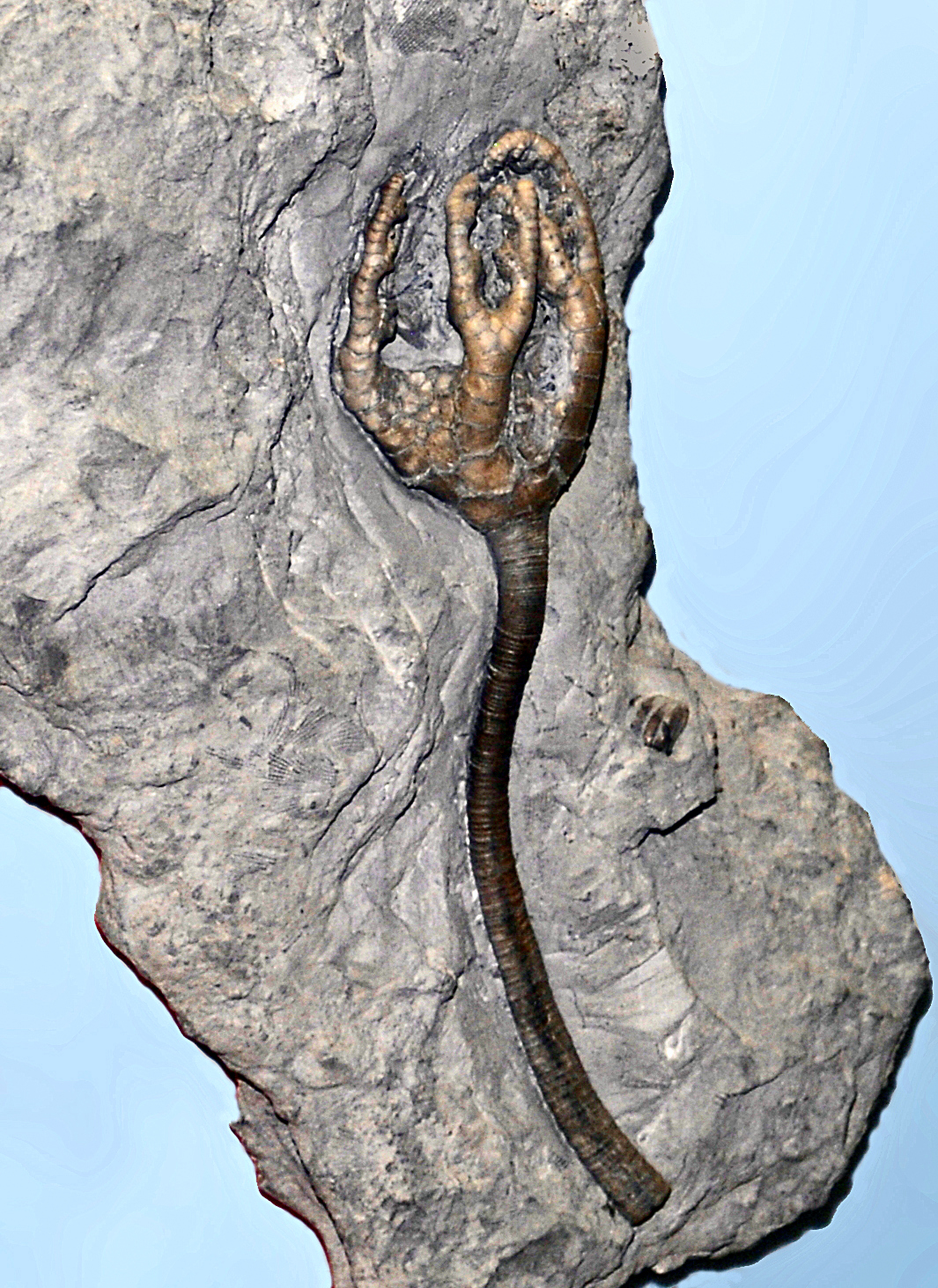
- Fossil of Onychocrinus species from Carboniferous of United States

Scientific classification
- Kingdom: Animalia
- Phylum: Echinodermata
- Class: Crinoidea
- Order: †Taxocrinida
- Family: †Synerocrinidae
- Genus: †Onychocrinus; Lyon and Casseday, 1860

= Onychocrinus =

Onychocrinus Temporal range: Carboniferous

Extinct genus of crinoids

Onychocrinus is an extinct genus of feathered crinoids that lived during the Carboniferous period, approximately 353.8 to 318.1 million years ago. It belonged to the family Synerocrinidae.

== Description ==
Onychocrinus exhibited the typical anatomy of crinoids, characterized by a cup-shaped calyx and multiple feathery arms used for suspension feeding. The dorsal cup was relatively low, and the arms were branching and often contracted in fossilized specimens. It also had a long stem (column).

== Fossil records ==
This genus is known in the fossil records of the Carboniferous period of United States and Canada.

== Bibliography ==
- F. Springer. 1906. Discovery of the Disk of Onychocrinus, and Further Remarks on the Crinoidea Flexibilia. The Journal of Geology, Volume 14.
- A. S. Horowitz. 1956. Fauna of Glen Dean Limestone (Chester) in Indiana and Northern Kentucky. unpublished Ph.D. thesis, Indiana University 1-449
- N. G. Lane, J. L. Matthews, E. G. Driscoll and E. L. Yochelson. 1973. Paleontology and paleoecology of the Crawfordsville fossil site (Upper Osagian: Indiana). University of California Publications in Geological Sciences 99:1-141
- W. I. Ausich. 1978. Community Organization, Paleontology, and Sedimentology of the Lower Mississippian Borden Delta Platform (Edwardsville Formation, Southern Indiana). Unpublished Doctoral Dissertation, Indiana University 1-433
- T. W. Kammer and W. I. Ausich. 2007. Stratigraphical and geographical distribution of Mississippian (Lower Carboniferous) Crinoidea from Scotland. Earth and Environmental Science Transactions of the Royal Society of Edinburgh 98:139-150
