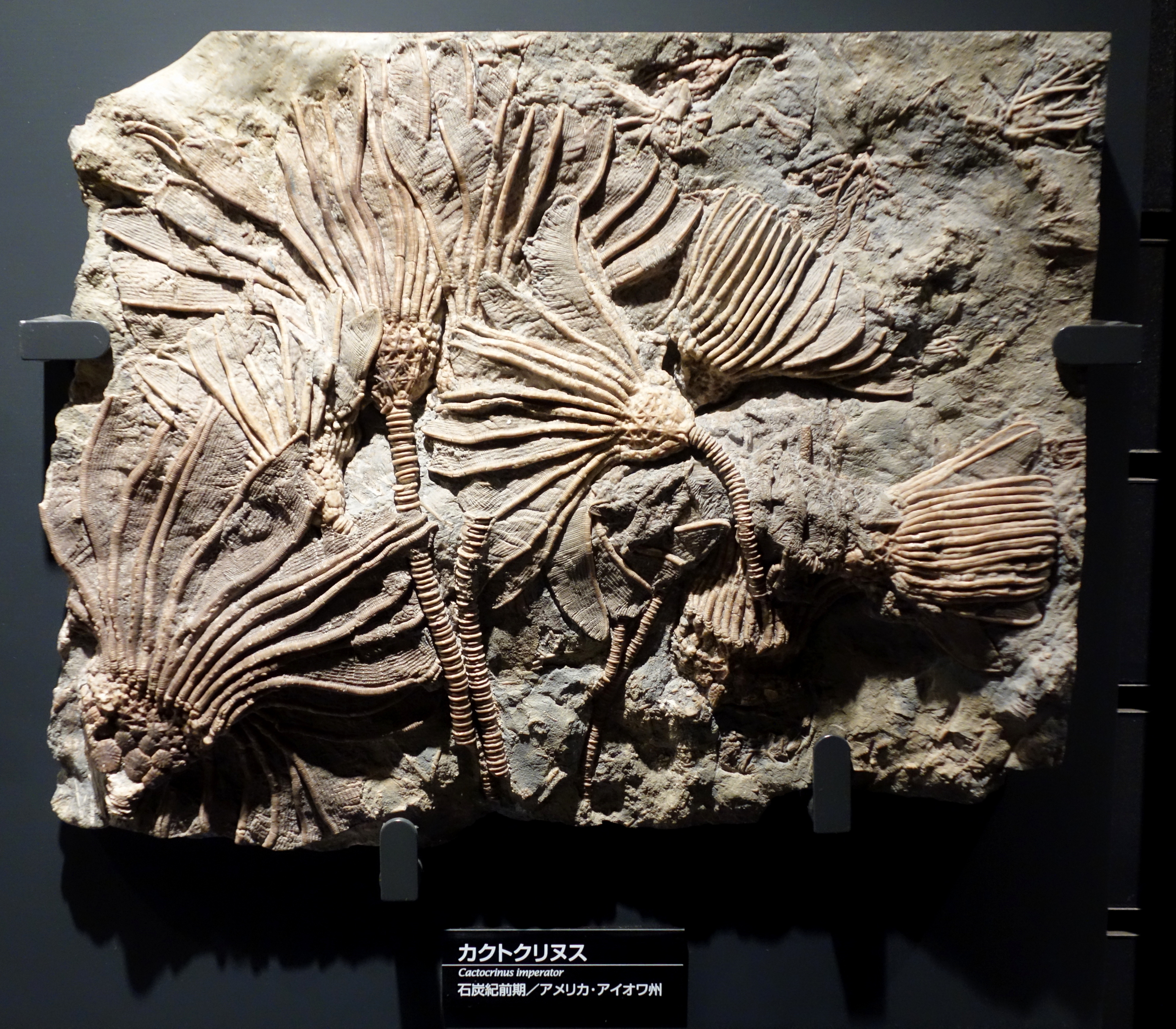
- Cactocrinus imperator

Scientific classification
- Kingdom: Animalia
- Phylum: Echinodermata
- Class: Crinoidea
- Subclass: †Camerata
- Order: †Monobathrida; Moore and Laudon, 1943

= Monobathrida =

Monobathrida Temporal range: Ordovician–Permian

Extinct order of crinoids

Monobathrida is an extinct order of crinoids, part of the extinct subclass Camerata, ranging from the Ordovician to Permian periods. They are characterised by a monocyclic calyx.

== Genera ==
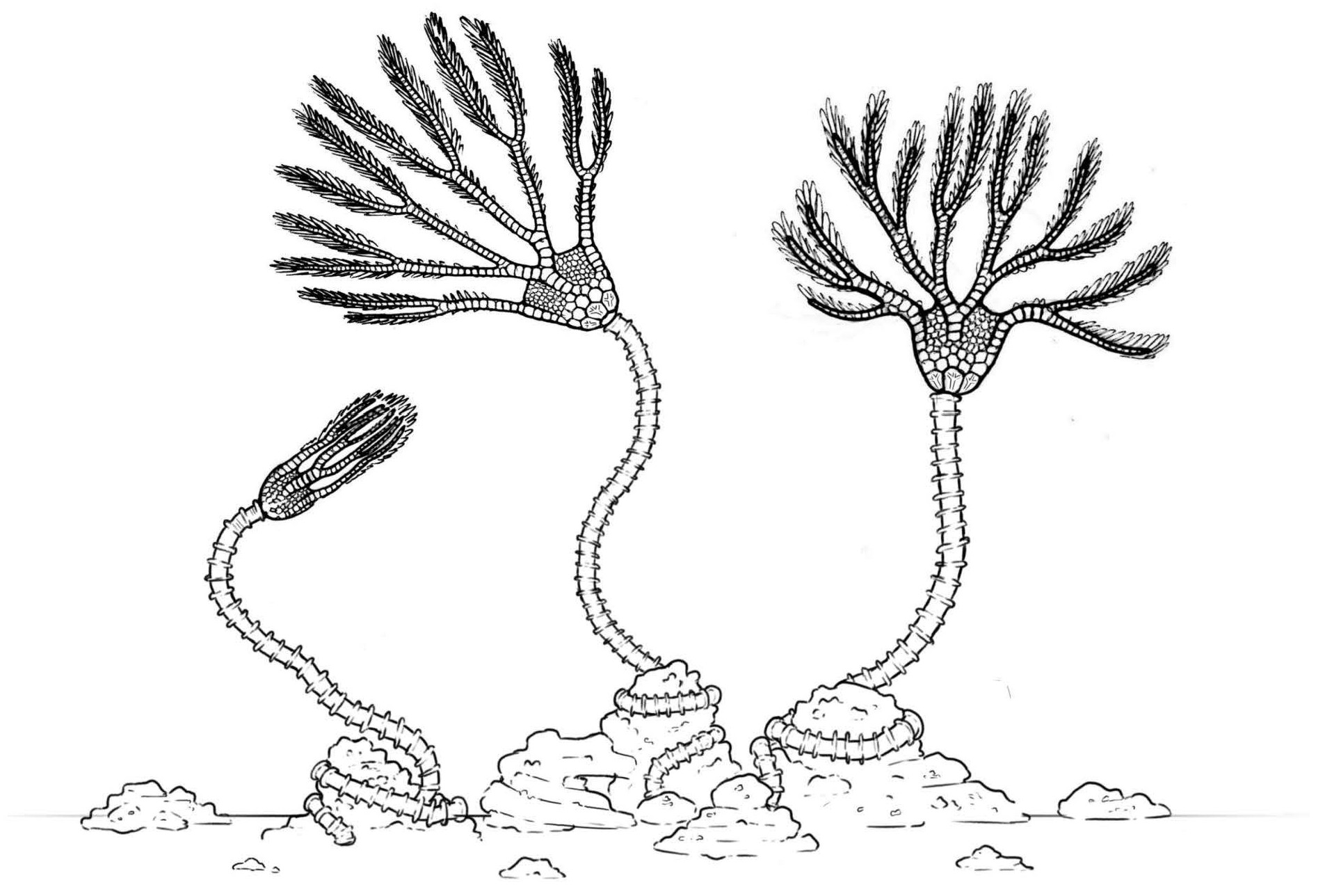
Life restoration of Pycnocrinus

- Aacocrinus
- Abacocrinus
- Abactinocrinus
- Abathocrinus
- Abatocrinus
- Abludoglyptocrinus
- Acacocrinus
- Actinocrinites
- Actinocrinus
- Acrocrinus
- Agaricocrinus
- Agathocrinus
- Alisocrinus
- Allocrinus
- Alloprosallocrinus
- Amarsupiocrinus
- Amblacrinus
- Amonohexacrinus
- Amphoracrinus
- Amphoracrocrinus
- Ancalocrinus
- Archaeocalyptocrinus
- Arthroacantha
- Aryballocrinus
- Athabascacrinus
- Azygocrinus
- Barrandeocrinus
- Batocrinus
- Beyrichocrinus
- Bikocrinus
- Blairocrinus
- Bogotacrinus
- Bohemicocrinus
- Bolicrinus
- Boliviacrinus
- Brahmacrinus
- Briarocrinus
- Cactocrinus
- Calliocrinus
- Camarocrinus
- Canistrocrinus
- Cantharocrinus
- Carolicrinus
- Carpocrinus
- Caucacrocrinus
- Celtocrinus
- Centriocrinus
- Cerasmocrinus
- Chinacrinus
- Clarkeocrinus
- Clematocrinus
- Clonocrinus
- Closterocrinus
- Coelocrinus
- Comanthocrinus
- Compsocrinina
- Compsocrinus
- Cordylocrinus
- Corocrinus
- Craterocrinus
- Ctenocrinus
- Culicocrinus
- Cusacrinus
- Cylicocrinus
- Cytidocrinus
- Cytocrinus
- Cyttarocrinus
- Desmidocrinus
- Dialutocrinus
- Diatorocrinus
- Dilatocrinus
- Dinacrocrinus
- Displodocrinus
- Dizygocrinus
- Dolatocrinicae
- Dorycrinus
- Ectocrinus
- Eocamptocrinus
- Eopatelliocrinus
- Eretmocrinus
- Eucladocrinus
- Eutelecrinus
- Eutrochocrinus
- Exsulacrinus
- Glaphyocrinus
- Globacrocrinus
- Glyptocrinina
- Glyptocrinus
- Hadrocrinus
- Harrelicrinus
- Hexacriniticae
- Himerocrinus
- Hyrtanecrinus
- Ibanocrinus
- Iberocrinus
- Ilmocrinus
- Ivanovaecrinus
- Krinocrinus
- Kylixocrinus
- Laurelocrinus
- Lenneocrinus
- Liomolgocrinus
- Lobomelocrinus
- Lyonicrinus
- Macrocrinus
- Maligneocrinus
- Manillocrinus
- Manticrinus
- Marhoumacrinus
- Marsupiocrinus
- Melocrinites
- Metacrocrinus
- Metaeutelecrinus
- Methabocrinus
- Nanicrinus
- Neocamtocrinus
- Neodichocrinus
- Nunnacrinus
- Oehlerticrinus
- Oenochoacrinus
- Paiderocrinus
- Pandanocrinus
- Paracrocrinus
- Paradichocrinus
- Paragaricocrinus
- Parahexacrinus
- Paramegaliocrinus
- Paramelocrinus
- Paratalarocrinus
- Patelliocrinidae
- Patelliocrinus
- Periechocrinoidea
- Periechocrinus
- Periglyptocrinus
- Phrygilocrinus
- Physetocrinus
- Pimlicocrinus
- Pithocrinus
- Planacrocrinus
- Platyacrocrinus
- Platyhexacrinus
- Plemnocrinus
- Plesiocrinus
- Polypeltes
- Pradocrinus
- Praedicticrinus
- Prohexacrinus
- Prokopicrinus
- Promelocrinus
- Protacrocrinus
- Pterotocrinus
- Pycnocrinus
- Pyxidocrinus
- Sampsonocrinus
- Schizocrinus
- Scyphocrinites
- Scyphocrinus
- Shimantocrinus
- Springeracrocrinus
- Stamnocrinus
- Steganocrinus
- Stelidiocrinus
- Stipatocrinus
- Stiptocrinus
- Strotocrinus
- Struszocrinus
- Sunwaptacrinus
- Talarocrinus
- Tanaocrinina
- Tarantocrinus
- Technocrinus
- Teleiocrinus
- Thallocrinus
- Thamnocrinus
- Theleproktocrinus
- Thomasocrinus
- Tirocrinus
- Trichotocrinus
- Trybliocrinus
- Tunisiacrinidae
- Typanocrinus
- Uperocrinus
- Wannerocrinus
- Xenocrinus
- Zenkericrinus
- Zirocrinus
