= Cicerocrinus =

Cicerocrinus Temporal range: 425.6–419.2 Ma

Scientific classification
- Kingdom: Animalia
- Phylum: Echinodermata
- Class: Crinoidea
- Parvclass: †Disparida
- Family: †Pisocrinidae
- Genus: †Cicerocrinus; Sollas 1900

Species
- †Cicerocrinus anglicus (Jaekel 1900); †Cicerocrinus elegans Sollas 1900 (syn. Lagarocrinus tenuis Jaekel 1900)

Extinct genus of crinoids

Cicerocrinus is an extinct genus of crinoids in the family Pisocrinidae. It is known from the Silurian of the United Kingdom. The type locality for C. elegans is Old Bridge near Ludlow.
