= Pernerocrinus =

Pernerocrinus Temporal range: Devonian

Scientific classification
- Kingdom: Animalia
- Phylum: Echinodermata
- Class: Crinoidea
- Order: †Cyathocrinida
- Family: †Crotalocrinitidae
- Genus: †Pernerocrinus; Bouška, 1946

Extinct genus of crinoids

Pernerocrinus is an extinct genus of crinoids from the Devonian.
