= Leintwardine Beds =

- Stratigraphic range: Silurian
- Type: Formation

Location
- Region: England
- Country: United Kingdom

The Leintwardine Beds is a geologic formation in England. It preserves marine fossils, notably of the brachiopod Lingula, dating back to the Ludlow stage of the late Silurian period.

== See also ==
- List of fossiliferous stratigraphic units in England
