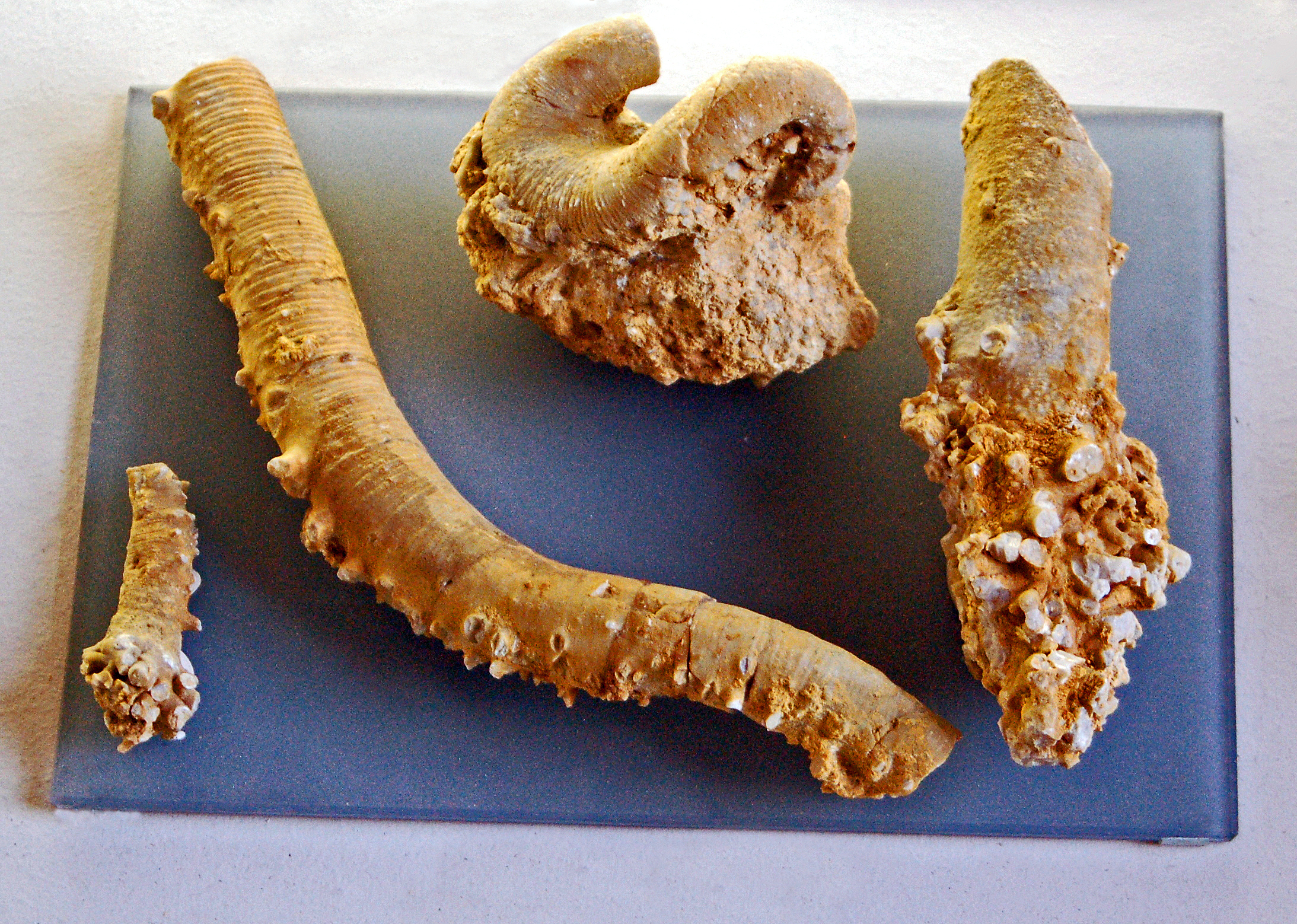
- Crotalocrinites sp. from Koněprusy (Czech Republic) at the National Museum (Prague)

Scientific classification
- Kingdom: Animalia
- Phylum: Echinodermata
- Class: Crinoidea
- Order: †Cyathocrinida
- Family: †Crotalocrinitidae
- Genus: †Crotalocrinites; Austin, 1842

= Crotalocrinites =

Crotalocrinites Temporal range: Silurian

Extinct genus of crinoids

Crotalocrinites is a genus of extinct crinoid belonging to the family Crotalocrinitidae. These feather stars were stationary intermediate-level organisms feeding on suspension epifauna. They lived in the Silurian period, from the Upper Wenlock age (428.2 ± 1.5 to 422.9 ± 2.8 mya) to the Ludlow age (422.9 ± 1.5 to 418.7 ± 2.8 mya).

== Distribution ==
Devonian of Australia, Kazakhstan, Mongolia. Silurian of Norway, Russia, Ukraine, the United Kingdom, and United States (Illinois, Indiana, Iowa, Wisconsin).

== Species ==
- Crotalocrinites cora
- Crotalocrinites rugosus
