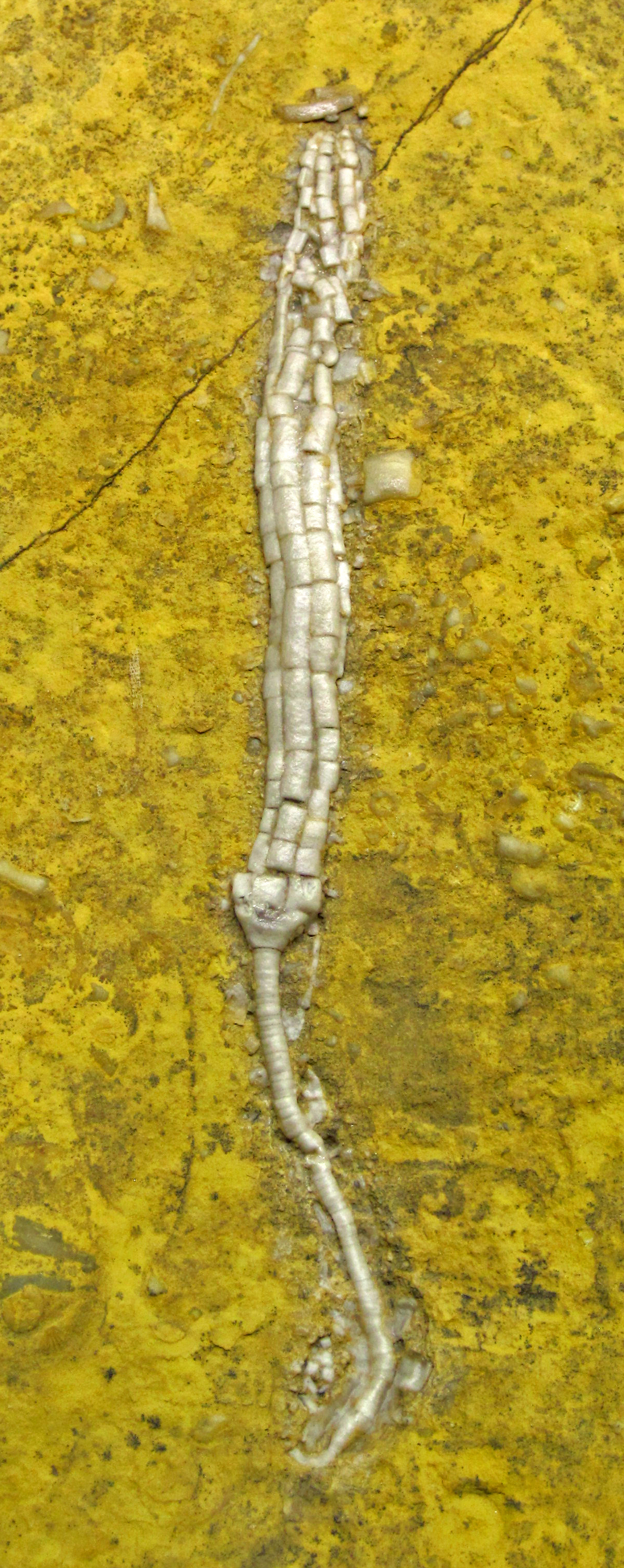
- Synbathocrinus from the Mississippian of Missouri, USA

Scientific classification
- Kingdom: Animalia
- Phylum: Echinodermata
- Class: Crinoidea
- Infraclass: Inadunata
- Parvclass: †Disparida; Moore & Laudon, 1943

Orders
- Calceocrinida; Eustenocrinida; Homocrinida; Maennilicrinida; Myelodactyla; Pisocrinoidea; Tetragonocrinida

= Disparida =

Disparida Temporal range: Tremadocian–Middle Permian

Extinct clade of crinoids

Disparida is an parvclass of extinct marine animals in the class Crinoidea. Disparids are a speciose and morphologically diverse group of crinoids distinguished by their monocyclic calyx and slender arms without pinnules. They range from the Early Ordovician (Tremadocian) to Middle Permian, reaching their highest diversity during the Late Ordovician.

While many disparids had a generalized shape typical of other stalked crinoids, some subgroups achieved strange forms. The long-lasting Calceocrinidae were recumbent forms, with a flattened crown bent back onto a stalk which rested on the seafloor. Other unusual disparid families include the armless Zophocrinidae, the spiral-armed Myelodactylidae, and the diminutive, simplified Pisocrinidae. Disparids have long been classified by the structure of their radial plates and different planes of symmetry, but a cumulative phylogenetic approach has failed to confirm the validity of many proposed subgroups. Nevertheless, Disparida itself is well-supported as a distinct monophyletic group.

Major traits of Disparida include:

- Small monocyclic calyx, without interbasal plates. Radial plates are proportionally large and may be compound (with multiple components), while basal plates are often reduced.
- Proximal branchial plates tend to fuse with their respective radials.
- Thin, uniserial arms without pinnules. Branching is typically frequent.
- Redevelopment of prominent bilateral symmetry via an axis aligned to one of the five rays making up the crown. This axis of symmetry may lie along the E ray (homocrinoid symmetry), D ray (heterocrinoid symmetry), C ray (isocrinoid symmetry), or A ray (crinoid/belemnocrinoid symmetry, which is developed to a lesser degree in other crinoids).
- Posterior plates lie above the C radial.

== List of families and genera ==
Disparida classification is undergoing revision. Many proposed families are paraphyletic or polyphyletic.

Family Acolocrinidae

- Acolocrinus
- Paracolocrinus

Family Allagecrinidae

- Allagecrinus
- Isoallagecrinus
- Kallimorphocrinus
- Litocrinus
- Metallagecrinus
- Wrightocrinus

Family Alphacrinidae

- Alphacrinus

Family Anamesocrinidae

- Anamesocrinus

Family Anomalocrinidae

- Anomalocrinus
- Geraocrinus

Family Aptocrinidae

- Othneiocrinus

Family Athenacrinidae

- Athenacrinus

Family Belemnocrinidae

- Belemnocrinus
- Whiteocrinus

Family Calceocrinidae

- Anulocrinus
- Calceocrinus
- Catatonocrinus
- Charactocrinus
- Chirocrinus
- Chiropinna
- Corvucrinus
- Cremacrinus
- Cunctocrinus
- Darraghcrinus
- Deltacrinus
- Diaphorocrinus
- Dolerocrinus
- Eohalysiocrinus
- Epihalysiocrinus
- Espanocrinus
- Grypocrinus
- Halysiocrinus
- Minicrinus
- Paracremacrinus
- Senariocrinus
- Stibarocrinus
- Synchirocrinus
- Trypherocrinus

Family Catillocrinidae

- Allocatillocrinus
- Catillocrinus
- Eucatillocrinus
- Kolvacrinus
- Isocatillocrinus
- Metacatillocrinus
- Mycocrinus
- Neocatillocrinus
- Notiocatillocrinus
- Paracatillocrinus
- Taucatillocrinus
- Ufacrinus
- Xenocatillocrinus

Family Cincinnaticrinidae (i.e. Heterocrinidae, paraphyletic / polyphyletic)

- Atyphocrinus
- Cincinnaticrinus
- Doliocrinus
- Dystactocrinus
- Glaucocrinus
- Heterocrinus
- Isotomocrinus
- Ohiocrinus
- Serendipocrinus
- Tenuicrinus
- Tryssocrinus

Family Columbicrinidae

- Columbicrinus
- Praecursoricrinus

Family Dulkumocrinidae

- Dulkumocrinus

Family Eustenocrinidae

- Cataractocrinus
- Coralcrinus
- Eustenocrinus
- Inyocrinus
- Peniculocrinus
- Pogonipocrinus
- Virucrinus

Family Haplocrinitidae

- Haplocrinites

Family Homocrinidae (paraphyletic / polyphyletic)

- Apodasmocrinus
- Bodacrinus
- Cataraquicrinus
- Daedalocrinus
- Difficilicrinus
- Drymocrinus
- Ectenocrinus
- Homocrinus
- Ibexocrinus
- Kastorcrinus
- Penicillicrinus
- Sygcaulocrinus
- Tunguskocrinus

Family Iocrinidae (paraphyletic)

- Caleidocrinus
- Grammocrinus
- Iocrinus
- Margoiocrinus
- Muicrinus
- Pariocrinus
- Peltacrinus
- Ristnacrinus
- Schaldichocrinus
- Tornatilicrinus
- Westheadocrinus

Family Maennilicrinidae

- Heviacrinus
- Maennilicrinus
- Putilovocrinus
- Vosekocrinus

Family Myelodactylidae

- Brachiocrinus
- Crinobrachiatus
- Eomyelodactylus
- Herpetocrinus
- Musicrinus
- Myelodactylus

Family Pisocrinidae

- Cicerocrinus
- Eocicerocrinus
- Parapisocrinus
- Pisocrinus
- Playfordicrinus
- Triacrinus
- Trichocrinus

Family Pygmaeocrinidae (polyphyletic)

- Kroppocrinus
- Pygmaeocrinus
- Storthingocrinus

Family Synbathocrinidae

- Abyssocrinus
- Phimocrinus
- Ramacrinus
- Stylocrinus
- Synbathocrinus
- Taidocrinus
- Theloreus

Family Tetragonocrinidae

- Ramseyocrinus
- Tetragonocrinus

Family Zophocrinidae

- Parazophocrinus
- Tiaracrinus
- Zophocrinus

Incertae sedis

- Agostocrinus?
- Aureocrinus
- Brutopisocrinus
- Calcycanthocrinus
- Changinocrinus
- Claviculacrinus
- Desmacriocrinus
- Gongrocrinus
- Heracrinus
- Holynocrinus
- Hypsocrinus
- Jaekelicrinus
- Junocrinus
- Macnamaratylus
- Paradoxocrinus
- Perissocrinus
- Perittocrinus?
- Quiniocrinus
- Regnellicrinus
- Resetocrinus
- Stereobrachicrinus
- Tetracionocrinus?
- Thaminocrinus
- Trophocrinus
- Xisoallegocrinus
