= List of prehistoric echinoid genera =

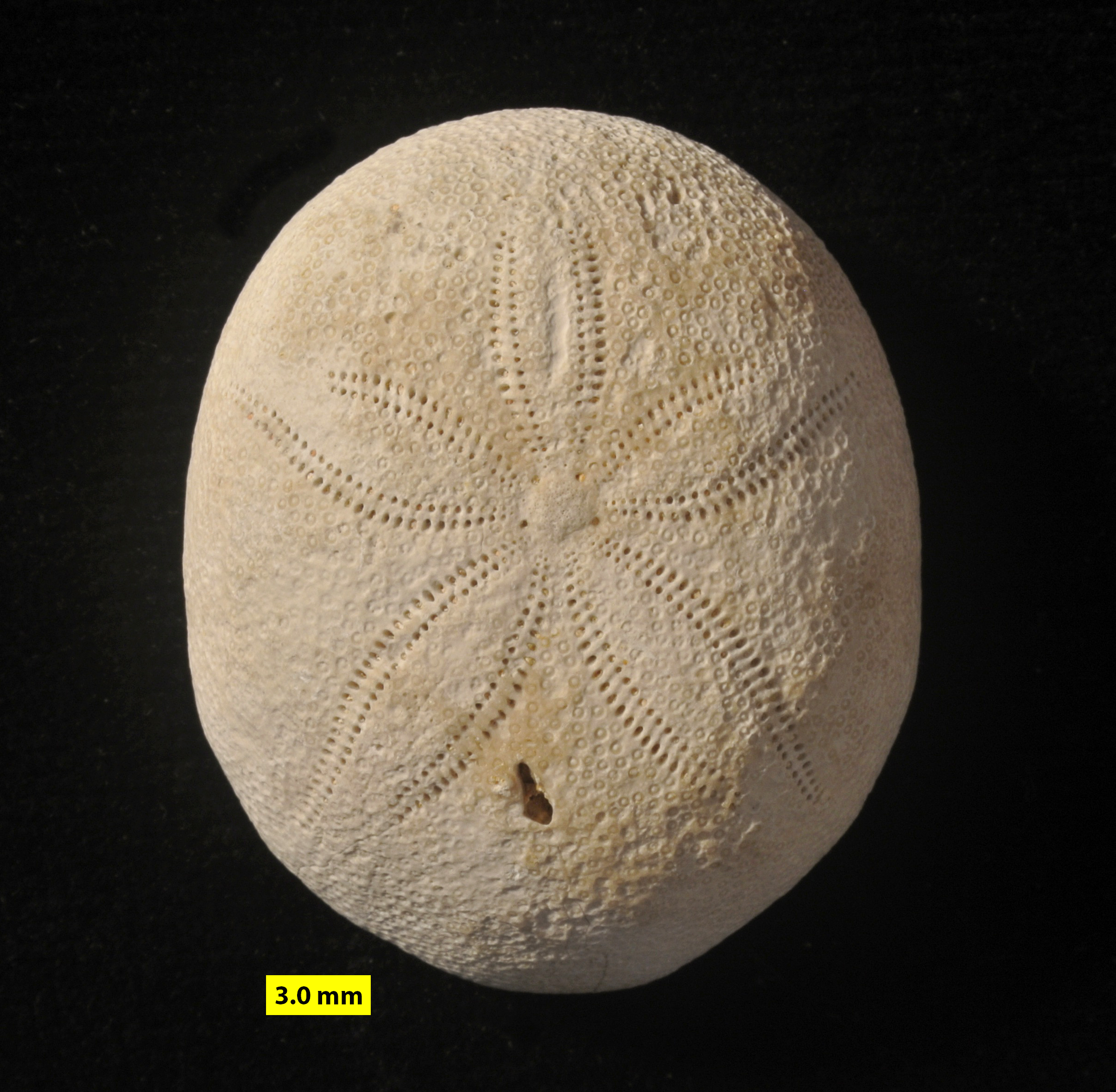
Echinolampas

This list of prehistoric echinoids is an attempt to create a comprehensive listing of all genera from the fossil record that have ever been considered to be echinoids, excluding purely vernacular terms. The list includes all commonly accepted genera, but also genera that are now considered invalid, doubtful (nomina dubia), or were not formally published (nomina nuda), as well as junior synonyms of more established names, and genera that are no longer considered echinoids.

== Naming conventions and terminology ==
Naming conventions and terminology follow the International Code of Zoological Nomenclature. Technical terms used include:

- Junior synonym: A name which describes the same taxon as a previously published name. If two or more genera are formally designated and the type specimens are later assigned to the same genus, the first to be published (in chronological order) is the senior synonym, and all other instances are junior synonyms. Senior synonyms are generally used, except by special decision of the ICZN, but junior synonyms cannot be used again, even if deprecated. Junior synonymy is often subjective, unless the genera described were both based on the same type specimen.
- Nomen nudum (Latin for "naked name"): A name that has appeared in print but has not yet been formally published by the standards of the ICZN. Nomina nuda (the plural form) are invalid, and are therefore not italicized as a proper generic name would be. If the name is later formally published, that name is no longer a nomen nudum and will be italicized on this list. Often, the formally published name will differ from any nomina nuda that describe the same specimen.
- Nomen oblitum (Latin for "forgotten name"): A name that has not been used in the scientific community for more than fifty years after its original proposal.
- Preoccupied name: A name that is formally published, but which has already been used for another taxon. This second use is invalid (as are all subsequent uses) and the name must be replaced. As preoccupied names are not valid generic names, they will also go unitalicized on this list.
- Nomen dubium (Latin for "dubious name"): A name describing a fossil with no unique diagnostic features. As this can be an extremely subjective and controversial designation, this term is not used on this list.

== The list ==
Genus	Authors	Year	Status	Age	Location	Notes
Abatus						
Abertella						
Acanthechinus						
Acriaster						
Acrocidaris						
Acrolusia						
Acropeltis						
Acrosalenia						
Acrosaster						
Actinophyma						
Adytaster						
Aeolopneustes						
Agassizia						
Aguayoaster						
Albertechinus						
Allocentrotus						
Allomma						
Allotoxaster						
Alpicidaris						
Ambipleurus						
Amblypgus						
Amblypneustes						
Ammotrophus						
Amoraster						
Amphiope						
Anaulocidaris						
Ancylocidaris						
Anisaser						
Anisocidaris						
Anorthopygus						
Antillaster						
Apatopygus						
Aphelaster						
Apoxypetalum						
Aprilechinus						
Arachniopleurus						
Arachnoides						
Araeosoma						
Arbacia						
Arbacina						
Arbia						
Archaechinus						
Archaeocidaris						
Archiacia						
Arnaudaster						
Asaphechinus						
Asterocidaris						
Asterostoma						
Asthenosoma						
Astriclypeus						
Astrodapsis						
Astrolampus						
Astropygaulus						
Atactus						
Atelospatangus						
Atlasaster						
Atopechinus						
Aulechinus						
Aurelianaster						
Australanthus						
Austrocidaris						
Balanocidaris						
Barnumia						
Basseaster						
Baueria						
Besairecidaris						
Boletechinus						
Bothriocidaris						
Bothryopneutes						
Bramus						
Breynia						
Brightonia						
Brisaster						
Brissolampas						
Brissomorpha						
Brissopatagus						
Brissopneustes						
Brissopsis						
Brissus						
Brochechinus						
Brochopleurus						
Caenholectypus						
Caenocidaris						
Cagaster						
Calilampus						
Calocidaris						
Camerogalerus						
Cardabia						
Cardiaster						
Cardiolampas						
Cardiopelta						
Cardiotaxis						
Caribbaster						
Cassidulus						
Catopygus						
Cavanechinus						
Centropygus						
Centrostephanus						
Cestobrissus						
Chelonechinus						
Cheopsia						
Chondrocidaris						
Chuniola						
Cibaster						
Cidaris						
Cidaropsis						
Cionobrissus						
Circopeltis						
Claviaster						
Cleistechinus						
Cluniaster						
Clypeanthus						
Clypeaster						
Clypeolampas						
Clypeopygus						
Clypeus						
Codechinus						
Codiopsis						
Coelopleurus						
Colliclypeus						
Collyrites						
Collyropsis						
Colpotiara						
Conoclypus						
Conulus						
Coptodiscus						
Coraster						
Corechinus						
Corthya						
Coryslus						
Cottaldia						
Cotteaudia						
Cottreaucorys						
Cravenechinus						
Crinocidaris						
Crucibrissus						
Cryptechinus						
Cubanaster						
Cyamidia						
Cyathocidaris						
Cyclaster						
Cyclolampas						
Daradaster						
Delocidaris						
Dendraster						
Deneechinus						
Desmechinus						
Desorella						
Devonocidaris						
Diadema						
Diademopsis						
Dialyaster						
Dictyopleurus						
Dicyclocidaris						
Diplechinus						
Diplocidaris						
Diplodetus						
Diplopodia						
Diploporaster						
Diplosalenia						
Diplotagma						
Disaster						
Discholectypus						
Discoides						
Distefanaster						
Ditremaster						
Dixieus						
Dixonia						
Domechinus						
Dorocidaris						
Douvillaster						
Dubarechinus						
Dumblea						
Duncaniaster						
Duperieria						
Durhamella						
Echinanthus						
Echinarachnius						
Echinocardium						
Echinocorys						
Echinocyamus						
Echinocyphus						
Echinocyphus						
Echinocystites						
Echinodiscus						
Echinogalerus						
Echinolampas						
Echinometra						
Echinoneus						
Echinopedina						
Echinopsis						
Echinostrephus						
Echinothuria						
Echinotiara						
Echinus						
Ectinechinus						
Ellipsechinus						
Emiratia						
Enallopneustes						
Encope						
Endeodiadema						
Engelia						
Enichaster						
Entomaster						
Eodiadema						
Eogaleropygus						
Eosalenia						
Eoscutella						
Eoscutum						
Eothuria						
Epiaster						
Erbechinus						
Eucidaris						
Eupatagus						
Eurhodia						
Eurypetalum						
Eurypneustes						
Eurysalenia						
Evechinus						
Faorina						
Farquharsonia						
Faujasia						
Fauraster						
Fellaster						
Fellius						
Fernandezaster						
Fibularia						
Fibulaster						
Fibulina						
Firmacidaris						
Fossulaster						
Fournierechinus						
Fourtaunia						
Gagaria						
Galeaster						
Galeola						
Galeraster						
Galerites						
Galeroclypeus						
Galeropygus						
Ganbirretia						
Garumnaster						
Gauthieria						
Gauthiosoma						
Gentilia						
Gibbaster						
Gillechinus						
Giraliaster						
Gitolampas						
Globator						
Glyphocyphus						
Glyphopneustes						
Glypotocidaris						
Glyptechinus						
Glypticus						
Glyptocyphus						
Gomphechinus						
Gongrochanus						
Goniocidaris						
Goniophorus						
Goniopygus						
Goniosigma						
Gonzalezaster						
Gotlandechinus						
Gracilechinus						
Grammechinus						
Granobrissoides						
Graphepleurus						
Grasia						
Gualtieria						
Guettaria						
Gymnocidaris						
Gymnodiadema						
Habanaster						
Hagenowia						
Haimea						
Hardouinia						
Hattopsis						
Heliocidaris						
Heliophora						
Helodiadema						
Hemiaster						
Hemicara						
Hemicidaris						
Hemidiadema						
Hemifaorina						
Hemigymnia						
Hemipedina						
Hemipneustes						
Hemithylus						
Hemitiaris						
Hernandezaster						
Herreraster						
Hesperaster						
Hessotiara						
Heteraster						
Heterobrissus						
Heterocentrotus						
Heterocidaris						
Heterodiadema						
Heterolampas						
Heteropedina						
Heterosalenia						
Hikelaster						
Hirudocidaris						
Histocidaris						
Holaster						
Holcopneustes						
Holectypus						
Homoeaster						
Homoeopetalus						
Hupea						
Huttonechinus						
Hyattechinus						
Hyboclypus						
Hypechinus						
Hypodiadema						
Hypopygurus						
Hyposalenia						
Hypsopatagus						
Hypsopygaster						
Hysteraster						
Idiocidaris						
Iheringiella						
Ilarionia						
Infraclypeus						
Infulaster						
Iraniaster						
Irenechinus						
Isaster						
Isechinus						
Ismidaster						
Isomicraster						
Isopetalum						
Isopneustes						
Jacksonaster						
Jacquiertia						
Jeannetia						
Jeronia						
Karlaster						
Kephrenia						
Kertaster						
Kewia						
Kierechinus						
Kina						
Kongielechinus						
Koninckocidaris						
Labrotaxis						
Laevipatagus						
Laganum						
Lajanaster						
Lambertechinus						
Lambertiaster						
Lambertona						
Lampadaster						
Lampadocorys						
Lanieria						
Lanternarius						
Laticlypus						
Ledidocidaris						
Lefortia						
Leiocyphus						
Leioechinus						
Leiopedina						
Leiostomaster						
Lenicyamidia						
Leniechinus						
Lenita						
Lenticidaris						
Leodia						
Lepidechinoides						
Lepidechinus						
Lepidesthes						
Lepidocentrus						
Leptechinus						
Leptocidaris						
Leptopleurus						
Leptosalenia						
Leurocidaris						
Levicidaris						
Leviechinus						
Linthia						
Loriolella						
Loriolia						
Loriolipedina						
Lovenechinus						
Lovenia						
Lovenilampas						
Lutetiaster						
Lytechinus						
Maccoya						
Macraster						
Macrodiadema						
Macropneustes						
Magnosia						
Maretia						
Mariania						
Martinechinus						
Mattsechinus						
Mauritanaster						
Mazzettia						
Medocechinus						
Meekechinus						
Megacidaris						
Megapetalus						
Megapneustes						
Megaporocidaris						
Mellita						
Mellitella						
Melonechinus						
Menocidaris						
Menopygus						
Menuthiaster						
Meoma						
Mepygurus						
Merocidaris						
Merriamaster						
Mesodiadema						
Mesodiadema						
Messaoudia						
Metalia						
Metaporinus						
Metholectypus						
Micraster						
Microcyphus						
Microdiadema						
Microlampas						
Micropedina						
Micropsis						
Migliorinia						
Mikrocidarió						
Minicidaris						
Miocidaris						
Mirechinus						
Moira						
Moiropsis						
Mokotibaster						
Monodiadema						
Monophoraster						
Monostychia						
Moronaster						
Mortensenaster						
Mortonella						
Mundaster						
Murravechinus						
Myriastiches						
Narindechinus						
Neobothriocidaris						
Neocatopygus						
Neoglobator						
Neolaganum						
Neoproraster						
Neorumphia						
Nipponaster						
Nipponaster						
Noetlingaster						
Nordenskjoeldaster						
Nortonechinus						
Notocidaris						
Notolampas						
Nucleolites						
Nucleopygus						
Nudechinus						
Nudobrissus						
Ochetes						
Oedematocidaris						
Offaster						
Oligophyma						
Oligoporus						
Oligopygus						
Oolopygus						
Opechinus						
Opisopneustes						
Opissaster						
Orbignyana						
Ornithaster						
Orthaster						
Orthocidaris						
Orthopsis						
Oustechnius						
Oviclypeus						
Ovulaster						
Ovulechinus						
Pachycidaris						
Palaechinus						
Palaeodiadema						
Palaeodiscus						
Palaeopedina						
Palaeostoma						
Paleopneustes						
Palhemiaster						
Palmeraster						
Palmerius						
Parabrissus						
Paracidaris						
Paradoxechinus						
Paraheteraster						
Parapygus						
Parasalenia						
Parascutella						
Paraster						
Parhabdocidaris						
Parmulechinus						
Paronaster						
Parvicidaris						
Paurocidaris						
Pedina						
Pedinopsis						
Pedinothuria						
Pelanechinus						
Pelanodiadema						
Pentechinus						
Pentedium						
Peraspatangus						
Periarchus						
Periaster						
Peribrissus						
Pericosmus						
Perischocidaris						
Perischodomus						
Peronella						
Peronellites						
Petalobrissus						
Phalacrocidaris						
Phalacropedina						
Pharaonaster						
Pholidechinus						
Pholidocidaris						
Phyllacanthus						
Phyllobrissus						
Phymechinus						
Phymopedina						
Phymosoma						
Phymotaxis						
Physaster						
Pictaviechinus						
Pileus						
Pisolampas						
Plagiobrissus						
Plagiochasma						
Platipygus						
Platybrissus						
Plegiocidaris						
Pleiechinus						
Pleiocyphus						
Plesiaster						
Plesiocidaris						
Plesiolampas						
Plesiopatagus						
Pleurodiadema						
Pliolampas						
Plococidaris						
Polycidaris						
Polycyphus						
Polydesmaster						
Polydiadema						
Polyplacida						
Polysalenia						
Polytaxicidaris						
Pomaster						
Porechinus						
Poriocidaris						
Porocidaris						
Poropeltaris						
Porosoma						
Porpitella						
Pourtalesia						
Prenaster						
Printechinus						
Prionechinus						
Prionocidaris						
Procidaris						
Proescutella						
Progonechinus						
Proholaster						
Pronechinus						
Prophyllacanthus						
Proraster						
Prosostoma						
Protenaster						
Proterocidaris						
Protobrissus						
Protocidaris						
Protolampas						
Protoscutella						
Prowillungaster						
Psammechinus						
Psephechinus						
Psephoaster						
Pseudananchys						
Pseudarbacia						
Pseudarbacina						
Pseudechinus						
Pseudholaster						
Pseudobrissus						
Pseudocentrotus						
Pseudocidaris						
Pseudodiadema						
Pseudodicoptella						
Pseudoffaster						
Pseudogibbaster						
Pseudolinthia						
Pseudopedina						
Pseudopygaulus						
Pseudopygurus						
Pseudorthopsis						
Pseudosalenia						
Pseudosorella						
Pseudowashitaster						
Pusillaster						
Pygaster						
Pygaulus						
Pygidiolampas						
Pygomalus						
Pygopistes						
Pygopyrina						
Pygorhynchus						
Pygorhytis						
Pygospatangus						
Pygurostoma						
Pygurus						
Pyrina						
Rachiosoma						
Radiobrissus						
Radiocyphus						
Radiolus						
Recrosalenia						
Remondella						
Rhabdocidaris						
Rhenechinus						
Rhopostoma						
Rhyncholampas						
Rhynchopygus						
Rhynobrissus						
Rispolia						
Rojasia						
Rotula						
Rotuloidea						
Royasendia						
Rumphia						
Runa						
Salenia						
Salenidia						
Salmacis						
Samlandaster						
Sanchezaster						
Sanchezella						
Santeelampas						
Sardocidaris						
Savainiaster						
Scagliaster						
Scaphechinus						
Scaptodiadema						
Schizaster						
Schizechinus						
Schizopneustes						
Scolechinus						
Scoliechinus						
Scutaster						
Scutella						
Scutellaster						
Scutellina						
Scutellinoides						
Scutulum						
Semipetalion						
Serpianotiaris						
Seunaster						
Silurocidaris						
Sinaecidaris						
Sismondia						
Somalechinus						
Somaliaster						
Spaniocyphus						
Spatagoides						
Spatangomorpha						
Spatangus						
Sphaerechinus						
Sphaerotiaris						
Stegaster						
Stegopygus						
Stenechinus						
Stenoaster						
Stereocidaris						
Sternotaxis						
Stigmatopygus						
Stirechinus						
Stomaporus						
Stomechinus						
Stomopneutes						
Strongylocentrotus						
Studeria						
Stylocidaris						
Taimanawa						
Taphraster						
Tarphypygus						
Tatechinus						
Temnechinus						
Temnocidaris						
Temnopleurus						
Temnotrema						
Tenuirachnius						
Termieria						
Tessieria						
Tetracidaris						
Tetragramma						
Tetraramania						
Thagastea						
Thierychinus						
Tholaster						
Thylechinus						
Tiarechinopsis						
Tiarechinus						
Tiaridia						
Tiaromma						
Titanaster						
Tithonia						
Togocyamus						
Tornquistellus						
Tournoueraster						
Toxaster						
Toxopatagus						
Toxopneustes						
Trachypatagus						
Tretocidaris						
Triadechinus						
Triadocidaris						
Triassicidaris						
Triplacidia						
Tripneustes						
Tripylus						
Trisalenia						
Trochalosoma						
Trochodiadema						
Trochoechinus						
Trochotiara						
Turanglaster						
Tylocidaris						
Unibothriocidaris						
Unifascia						
Valsalenia						
Vaquerosella						
Verbeekia						
Vernius						
Victoriaster						
Vinchuscanchaia						
Vologesia						
Vomeraster						
Washitaster						
Weisbordella						
Willungaster						
Winkleria						
Wrightia						
Wuarnia						
Wythella						
Xenechinus						
Xenocidaris						
Xysteria						
Zardinechinus						
Zenocentrotus						
Zeuglopleurus						
Zeugopleurus						
Zuffardia						
Zumoffenia						

== See also ==
- List of prehistoric brittle stars
- List of prehistoric sea cucumbers
- List of crinoid genera
