= Rotula (disambiguation) =

A rotula is a long and narrow strip of writing material, historically papyrus or parchment, that is wound around a wooden axle or rod.

Rotula may also refer to:

- Rotula (plant), a genus of flowering plants in the family Boraginaceae
- Rotula (echinoderm), a genus of echinoderms in the family Rotulidae
- Rotula, a prehistoric echinoderm genus
