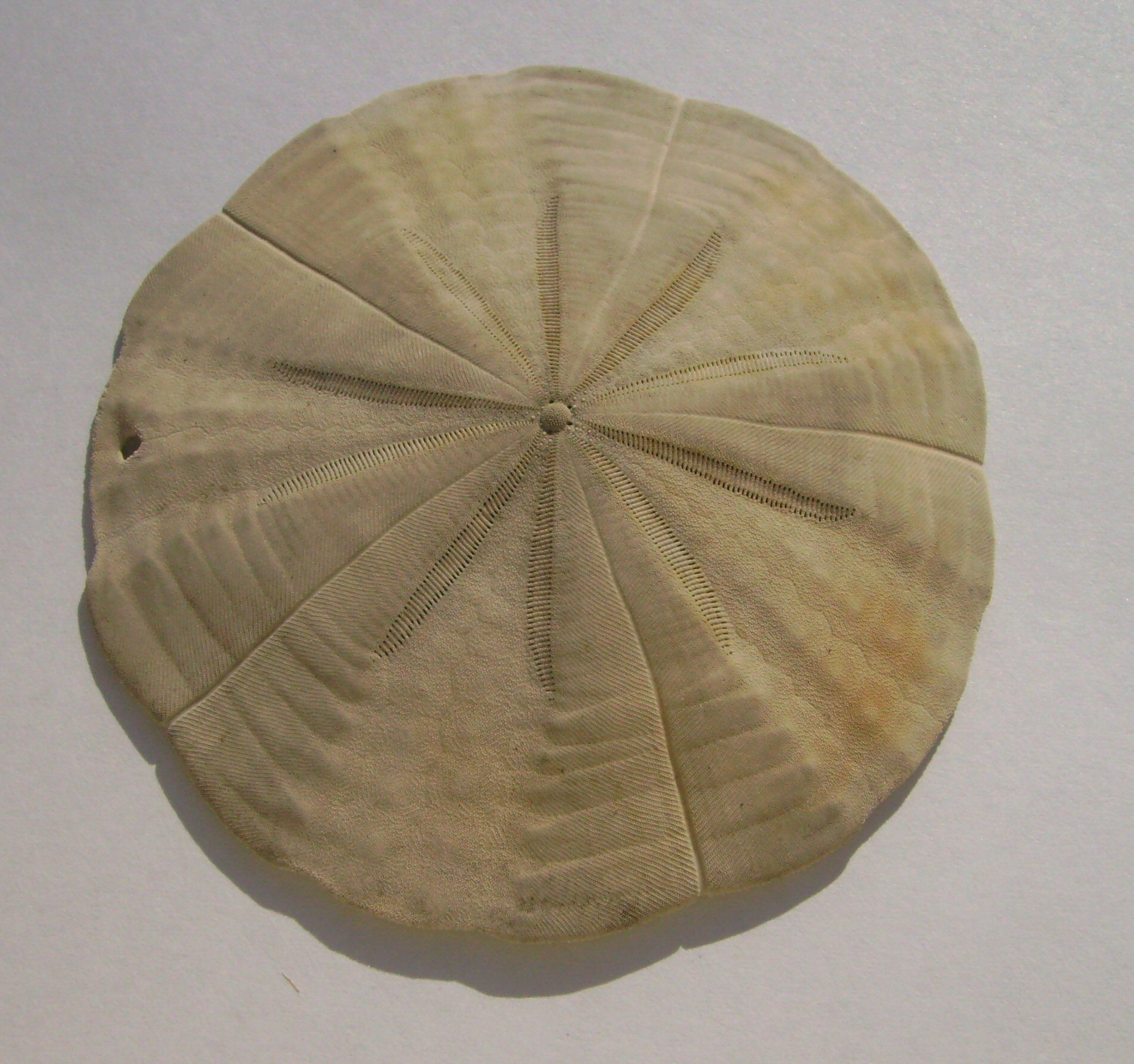
- Arachnoides zelandiae or snapper biscuit

Scientific classification
- Kingdom: Animalia
- Phylum: Echinodermata
- Class: Echinoidea
- Order: Clypeasteroida
- Family: Arachnoididae; Duncan, 1889

Genera
- See text

= Arachnoididae =

Family of sea urchins

Arachnoididae is a family of echinoderms of the order Clypeasteroida.

== Genera ==
- Ammotrophus H. L. Clark, 1928
- Arachnoides Leske, 1778
- Fellaster Durham, 1955
- Fossulaster Lambert & Thiery, 1925
- Monostychia Laube, 1869
- Philipaster Wang, 1994
- Prowillungaster Wang, 1994
- Scutellinoides Durham, 1955
- Willungaster Philip & Foster, 1971
