= Studeria =

Scientific classification
- Kingdom: Animalia
- Phylum: Echinodermata
- Class: Echinoidea
- Order: Cassiduloida
- Family: Neolampadidae
- Genus: Studeria; Duncan 1889

Species
- †Studeria elegans (Laube, 1869); Studeria recens (Agassiz, 1869); †Studeria rositae Sánchez Roig, 1953

Synonyms
- Hypselolampas Clark, 1917; †Pliolampas (Tristomanthus) Bittner, 1892; †Tristomanthus Bittner, 1892

Genus of sea urchins

Studeria is a genus of sea urchins in the family Neolampadidae.

†Studeria elegans (syn. Catopygus elegans Laube, 1869) is the type species.

== See also ==
- List of prehistoric echinoid genera
- List of prehistoric echinoderm genera
