= Echinolampas posterocrassa =

Echinolampas posterocrassa Temporal range: Eocene

Scientific classification
- Kingdom: Animalia
- Phylum: Echinodermata
- Class: Echinoidea
- Order: Cassiduloida
- Family: Echinolampadidae
- Genus: Echinolampas
- Species: †E. posterocrassa

Binomial name
- †Echinolampas posterocrassa Gregory, 1890

Species of fossil sea urchin

Echinolampas posterocrassa is an extinct species of echinolampadid echinoderm belonging to the genus Echinolampas that lived during the Eocene epoch.

== Palaeoecology ==
Numerous E. posterocrassa fossils have been found in deposits in Western Australia dating to the Middle Eocene containing boreholes evidencing that they were preyed on by cassid gastropods.
