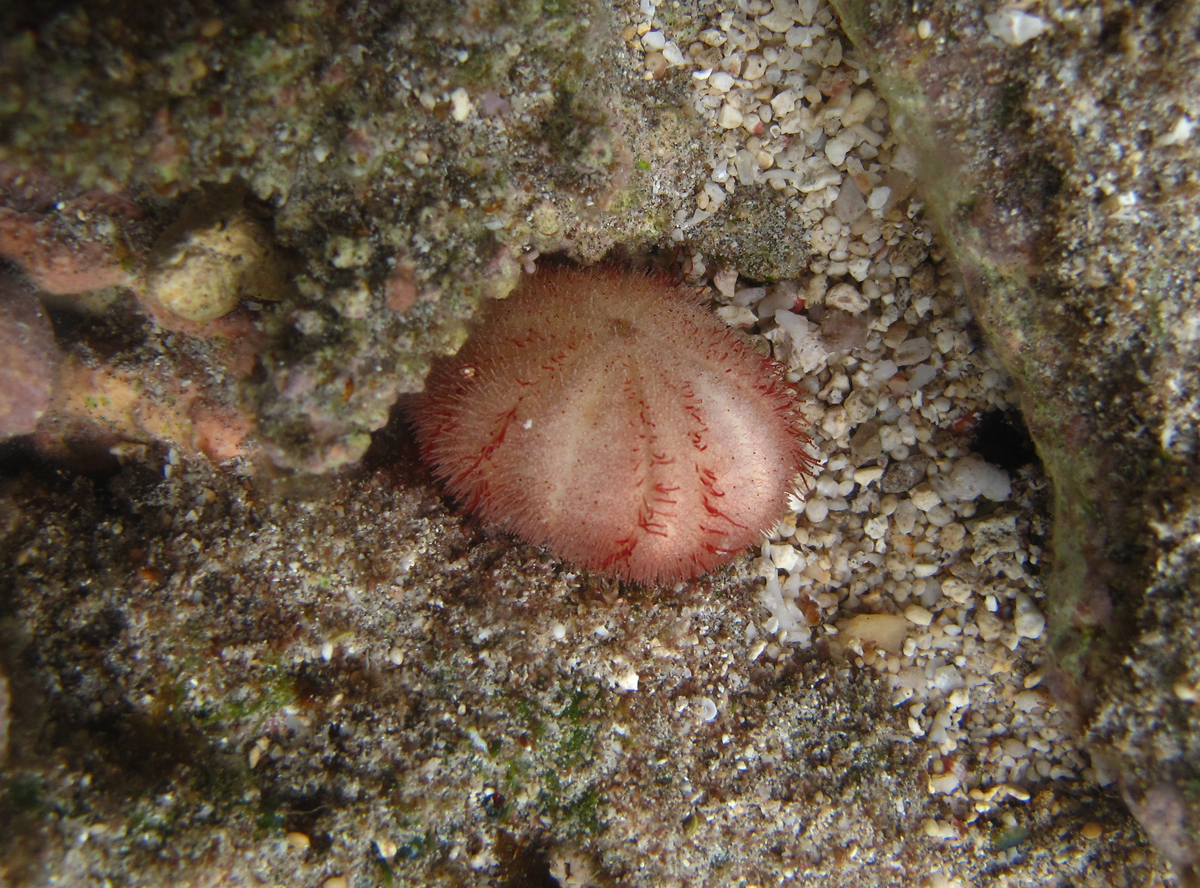
- Echinoneus cyclostomus

Scientific classification
- Kingdom: Animalia
- Phylum: Echinodermata
- Class: Echinoidea
- Order: Echinoneoida
- Family: Echinoneidae

= Echinoneidae =

Family of sea urchins

Echinoneidae is a family of echinoderms belonging to the order Echinoneoida.

Genera:

- Amblypygus L. Agassiz, 1840
- Duperieria Roman, 1968
- Echinoneus Leske, 1778
- Echinoneus van Phelsum, 1774
- Koehleraster Lambert & Thiéry, 1921
- Micropetalon A. Agassiz & H.L. Clark, 1907
- Paramblypygus Tessier & Roman, 1973
- Pseudohaimea Pomel, 1885
