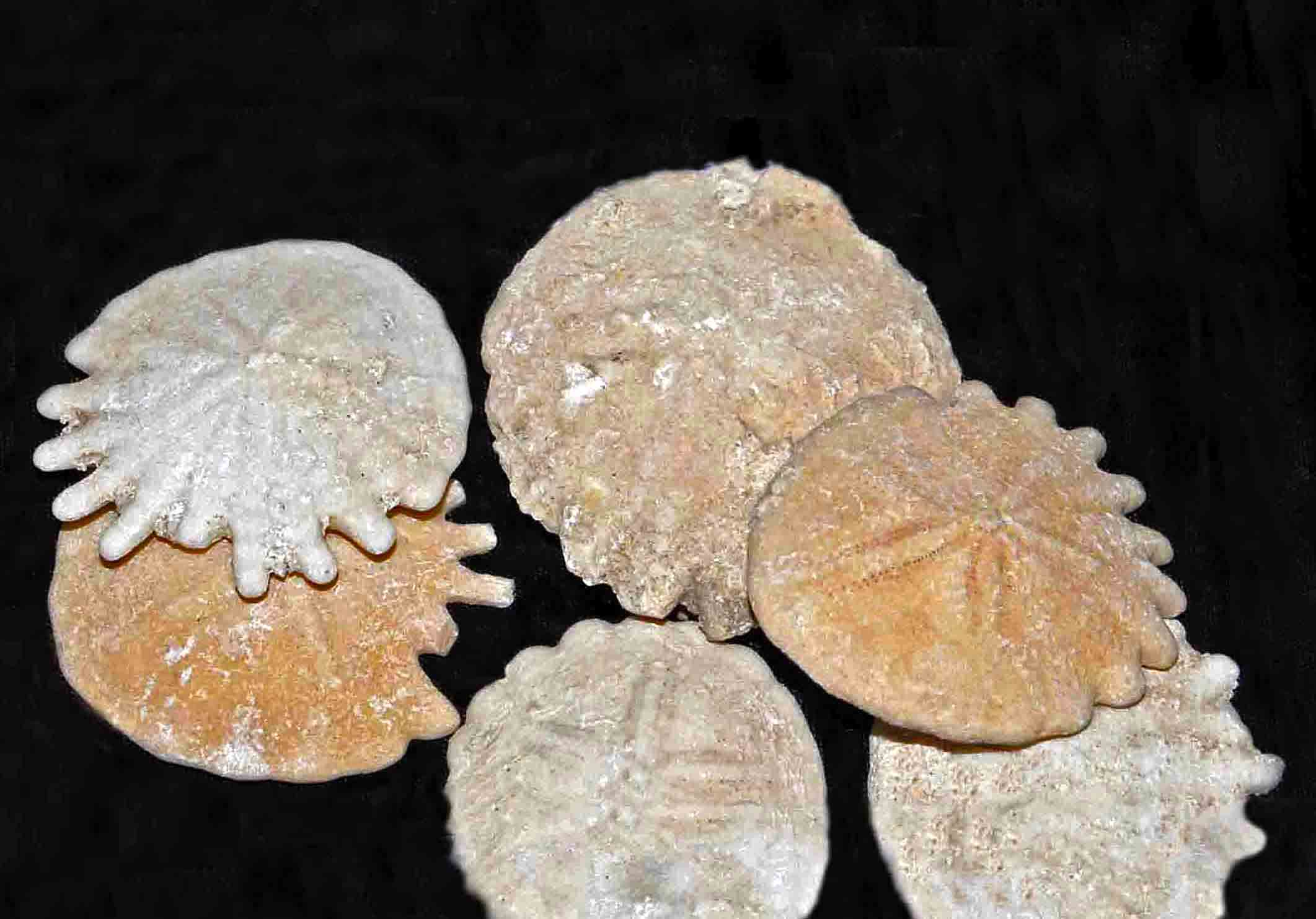
- Pliocene-aged fossils from Morocco

Scientific classification
- Kingdom: Animalia
- Phylum: Echinodermata
- Class: Echinoidea
- Order: Clypeasteroida
- Family: Rotulidae
- Genus: Heliophora; Agassiz 1840
- Species: H. orbicularis

Binomial name
- Heliophora orbicularis Agassiz 1840

= Heliophora =

Heliophora Temporal range: 9 –0 Ma Late Miocene to Recent

Genus of sea urchins

Heliophora orbicularis, also known as the West African sand dollar, is a small sand dollar in to the family Rotulidae, and the only species in the genus Heliophora. It, and other members of Rotulidae have been found in West African marine strata from the Late Miocene onward. Like the related Rotula, it is still extant.

== Description ==
Individuals of H. orbicularis are very distinctive in appearance and also highly morphic, with a remarkable diversity in individual specimens. This genus has an extremely variable circular to oval-shaped test. The indentations may remain restricted to the posterior edge or may be found along the entire margin of the test. The indentations may be very shallow or quite deep, forming long "fingers," or digits. The digits are very fragile, and prone to breaking off.

== Ecology and feeding ==
Heliophora orbicularis live in large groups in very shallow water of lagoons and estuaries, usually lightly buried in mud.

Food particles are picked out of the substrate by the tube feet, and are maneuvered into the food grooves along the oral side of the test, which are underneath the digits of the test. Once placed into a food groove, food particles are caught in a string of mucus and moved into the mouth, which is located in the very center of the oral side of the test.

== Distribution ==
This sand dollar is present from western coast of Sahara and Senegal to Angola.

== Morphology ==
Within a group of organisms, taxa showing morphological extremes are favorite objects in constructional morphology, and the West African Sand Dollar is no exception. The West African Sand Dollar is a bilaterian (animals with bilateral symmetry) even though adults possess radial symmetry, because the larvae possess bilateral symmetry. Since the organism is a bilaterian, it has three tissue layers: endoderm, ectoderm, and mesoderm. The sand dollar is part of the phylum Echinodermata, and so the organism has an endoskeleton composed of calcareous ossicles which grow from the mesodermal tissue. This endoskeleton is covered in ciliated tissue. The West African Sand Dollar is a deuterostome, meaning that the blastopore forms an anus instead of the mouth. The organism has an oral surface with podia (tube feet) and ambulacral grooves and an aboral surface. These tube feet are not used for locomotion in sand dollars, but instead for gas exchange. Instead, locomotion is achieved by movable spines. In the center of the test, the West African Sand Dollar has a feeding device called “Aristotle’s lantern.” Aristotle’s lantern is a complex system of jaws and muscles which are capable of a variety of feeding types including suspension feeding, herbivory and detritivory feeding, and occasionally predation. Adaptations to this lantern have allowed sand dollars to live in habitats which have fine, shifting substrates.

Just like other sand dollars, the West African Sand Dollar has a shallow dome with a thin edge that is ideal for burrowing. Equally important, as echinoids living on an unstable sediment surface swept by waves and currents, their form minimizes drag and facilitates maintenance of position. However, their low, domed profile acts as a hydrofoil and generates lift, which could send the sand dollar flowing into a harsh current. One adaptation to this generation of lift is the presence of lunules. Lunules reduce lift by interfering with attachment of flow or by bleeding off pressure from the under surface. Excess pressure on the oral surface of lunulate sand dollars is relieved by flow along pressure drainage channels which lead from the central region of the disc into the lunules and ambital notches. It is also hypothesized that lunules shorten the food path of sand dollars, however this is not fully supported by observation. West African Sand Dollars also have small spines that help them sieve food particles from sandy or silty sediments. These spines have lost their protection function and are used more for burrowing and feeding. Types of sand dollar spines include: Shoe spines (broad and tuberculate), Ambulatory spines (longer than shoe spines on lower surface), frill spines (flatter than ambulatory and larger), non-ambulatory spines (food collecting spines of ventral surface), and miliary spines (small and short).

== Delayed metamorphosis ==
The West African Sand Dollar, just like all other sand dollars, is capable of delaying metamorphosis for a limited amount of time. One study by Raymond C. Highsmith and Richard B. Emlet studied two sand dollar relatives of the West African Sand Dollar during the delayed metamorphosis period, testing with differing lengths of time in replicate fed and unfed treatments. Their results showed that spontaneous metamorphosis increased gradually during the first 3 weeks of competence, peaked sharply in the fourth week, and then declined to approximately 20% for each of the remaining 3 weeks. Their evidence also supports that growth rates of juveniles from weeks 2 and 4 that were maintained at 20 °C with and without sand indicate that juveniles grew more rapidly if sand was present. The reason this adaptation is beneficial is because sand dollars with higher growth rates also have higher mortality rates, which suggests that either the larvae did not use a significant amount of lipid energy reserves to survive or that energy reserves are not critical for the survival of the larvae. Another reason this adaptation is beneficial is because newly metamorphosed sand dollars are extremely vulnerable to tube-building predators such as Leptochelia dubia.
