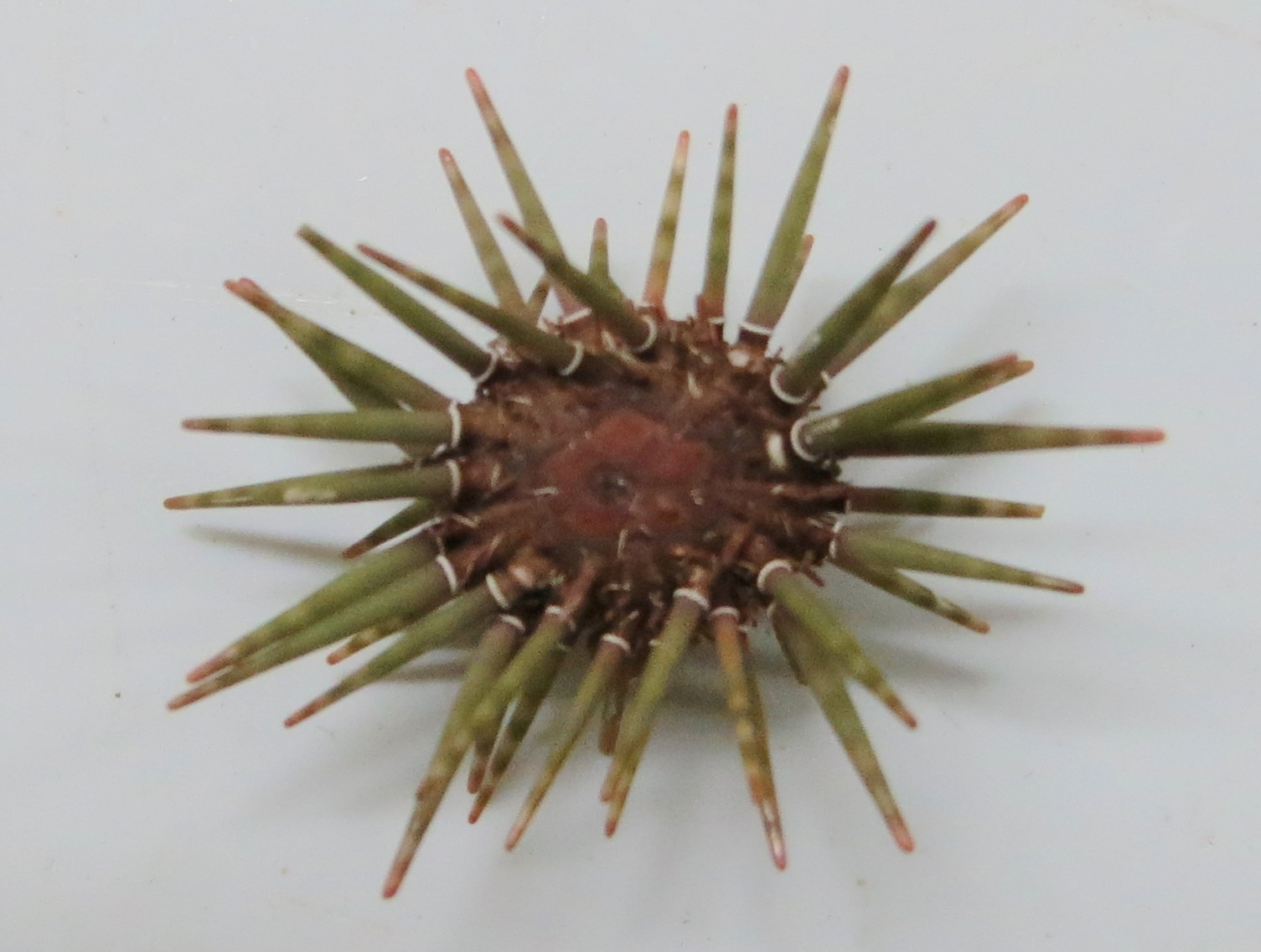
- Parasalenia poehlii

Scientific classification
- Kingdom: Animalia
- Phylum: Echinodermata
- Class: Echinoidea
- Order: Camarodonta
- Family: Parasaleniidae; Mortensen, 1903

= Parasaleniidae =

Family of sea urchins

Parasaleniidae is a family of echinoderms belonging to the order Camarodonta.

Genera:

- Diplosalenia
- Parasalenia
