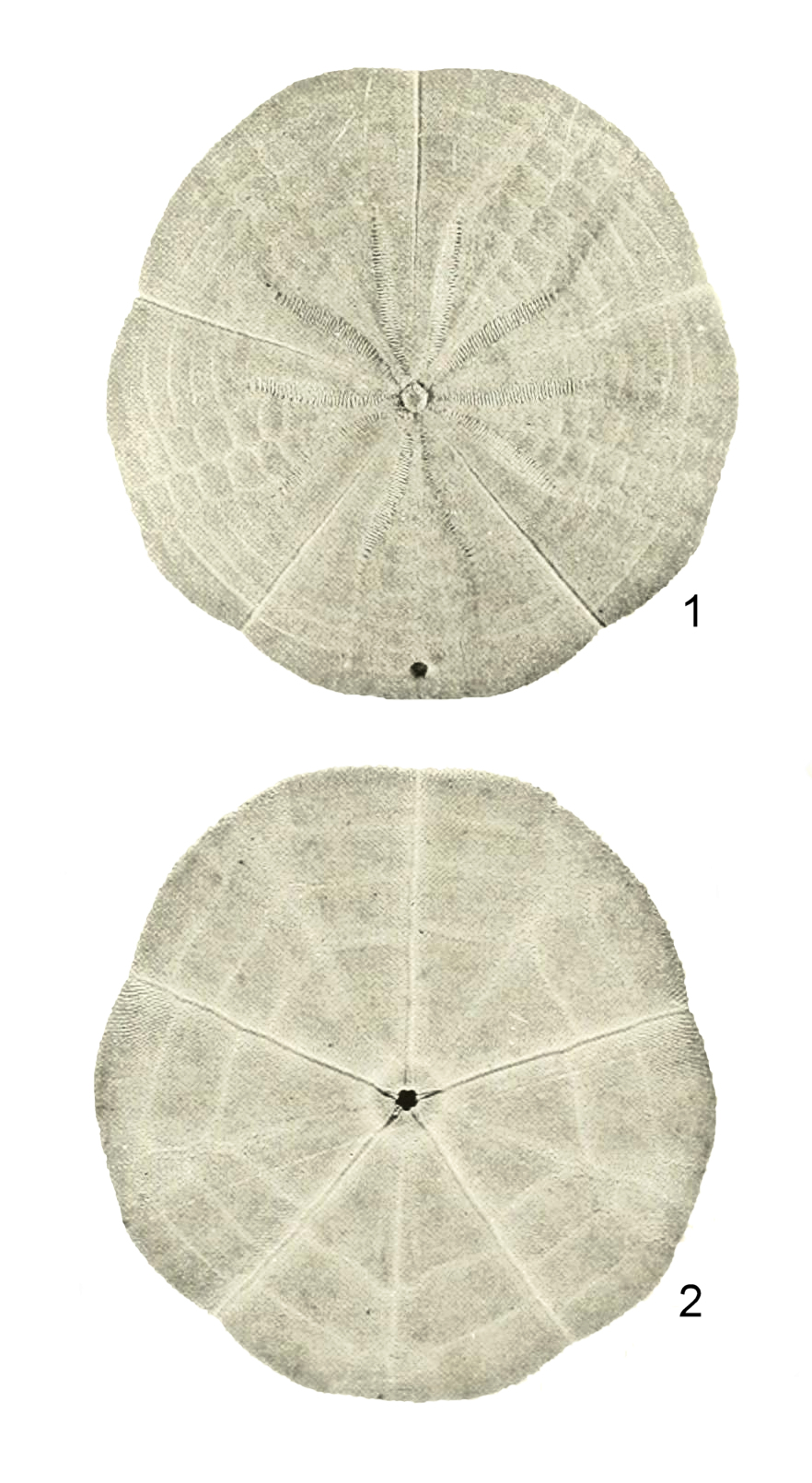

Scientific classification
- Domain: Eukaryota
- Kingdom: Animalia
- Phylum: Echinodermata
- Class: Echinoidea
- Order: Clypeasteroida
- Family: Clypeasteridae
- Genus: Arachnoides
- Species: A. tenuis

Binomial name
- Arachnoides tenuis Clark, 1938

= Arachnoides tenuis =

Species of sea urchin

Arachnoides tenuis is a species of sea urchin of the family Clypeasteridae. Their armour is covered with spines. It is placed in the genus Arachnoides and lives in the sea. Arachnoides tenuis was first scientifically described in 1938 by Hubert Lyman Clark.
