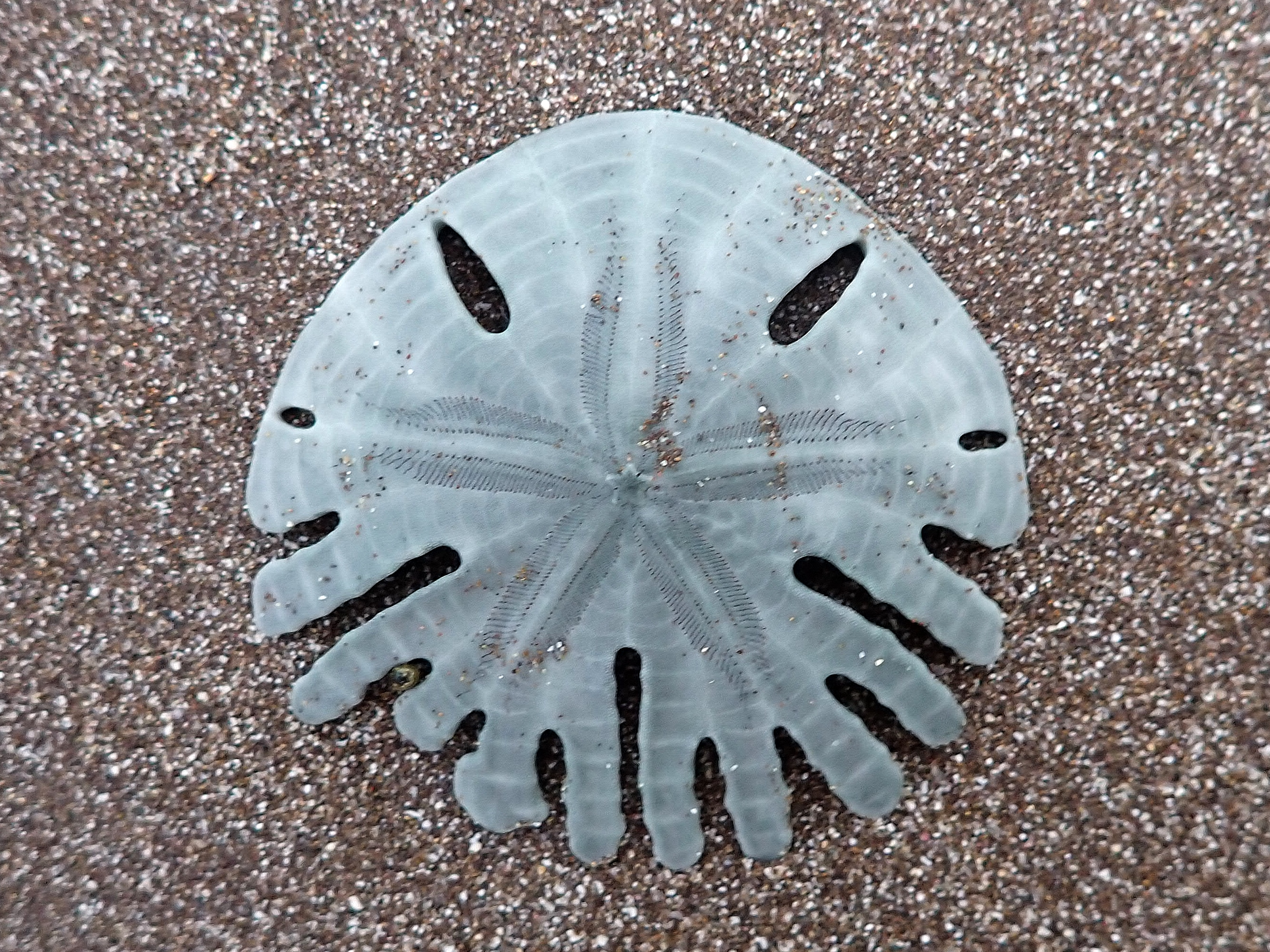
- Rotula deciesdigitatus from Sao Tomé.

Scientific classification
- Kingdom: Animalia
- Phylum: Echinodermata
- Class: Echinoidea
- Order: Clypeasteroida
- Family: Rotulidae; Gray, 1855

Genera
- Rotula; Heliophora; †Rotuloidea

= Rotulidae =

Rotulidae Temporal range: 9 –0 Ma Miocene to Recent

Family of sea urchins

Rotulidae is a family of small sand dollars native to the Atlantic coast of Africa, with 3 genera, with Rotula and Heliophora being extant, the other, Rotuloidea, being extinct since the Pliocene, but all three being found in the fossil record along the Atlantic African coast since the Miocene.

== Morphology ==
The generalized rotulid has a circular to oval-shaped test, and indentations starting along the posterior edge. In Heliophora, the indentations may remain restricted to the posterior edge, or they may reach to the anterior edges of the test. Depending on the individual, the indentations may be very shallow, or very deep, forming very long "fingers," or digits. While rotulids are very distinctive in appearance, they are also highly morphic, with a tremendous diversity seen in individual specimens. That the digits are very fragile, and prone to breaking off and regenerating only adds to individual variations.

In the genus Heliophora, the test is extremely variable. Depending on the individual, indentations may be shallow or deep, and may be restricted to the posterior edge, or may be found along the entire margin of the test.

In the genus Rotula, the test has up to eleven indentations along the posterior edge, forming up to twelve digits. The primary way to distinguish Rotula from Heliophora is that adult specimens of Rotula have up to four holes, or lunules, set into the anterior portion of the test.

In the extinct genus Rotuloidea, the test is oval-shaped, and comes to a blunt point at the anterior end of the test. There are nine, very shallow indentations along the posterior edge of the test. The tests of this genus are extremely similar to those of Heliophora, especially of young specimens, sometimes to the point of confusion.

== Ecology and feeding ==
The two living genera, Rotula and Heliophora, live in very shallow water of lagoons and estuaries, usually lightly buried in mud. As with many sand dollars, both live in large groups.

Food particles are picked out of the substrate by the tube feet, and are maneuvered into the food grooves along the oral side of the test, which are underneath the digits of the test. Once placed into a food groove, food particles are caught in a string of mucus and moved into the mouth, which is located in the very center of the oral side of the test.

== List of genera ==
According to WoRMS :

- genus Fibulariella Mortensen, 1948b
  - Fibulariella acuta (Yoshiwara, 1898)
  - Fibulariella angulipora (Mortensen, 1948)
  - Fibulariella oblonga (Gray, 1851)
  - Fibulariella volva (L. Agassiz in L. Agassiz & Desor, 1847a)
- genus Heliophora L. Agassiz, 1840a
  - Heliophora orbiculus (Linnaeus, 1758)
- genus Rotula Schumacher, 1817
  - Rotula deciesdigitatus (Leske, 1778)
- genus Rotuloidea Etheridge, 1872 †
  - Rotuloidea fimbriata Etheridge, 1872 †
  - Rotuloidea vieirai Dartevelle, 1953b †

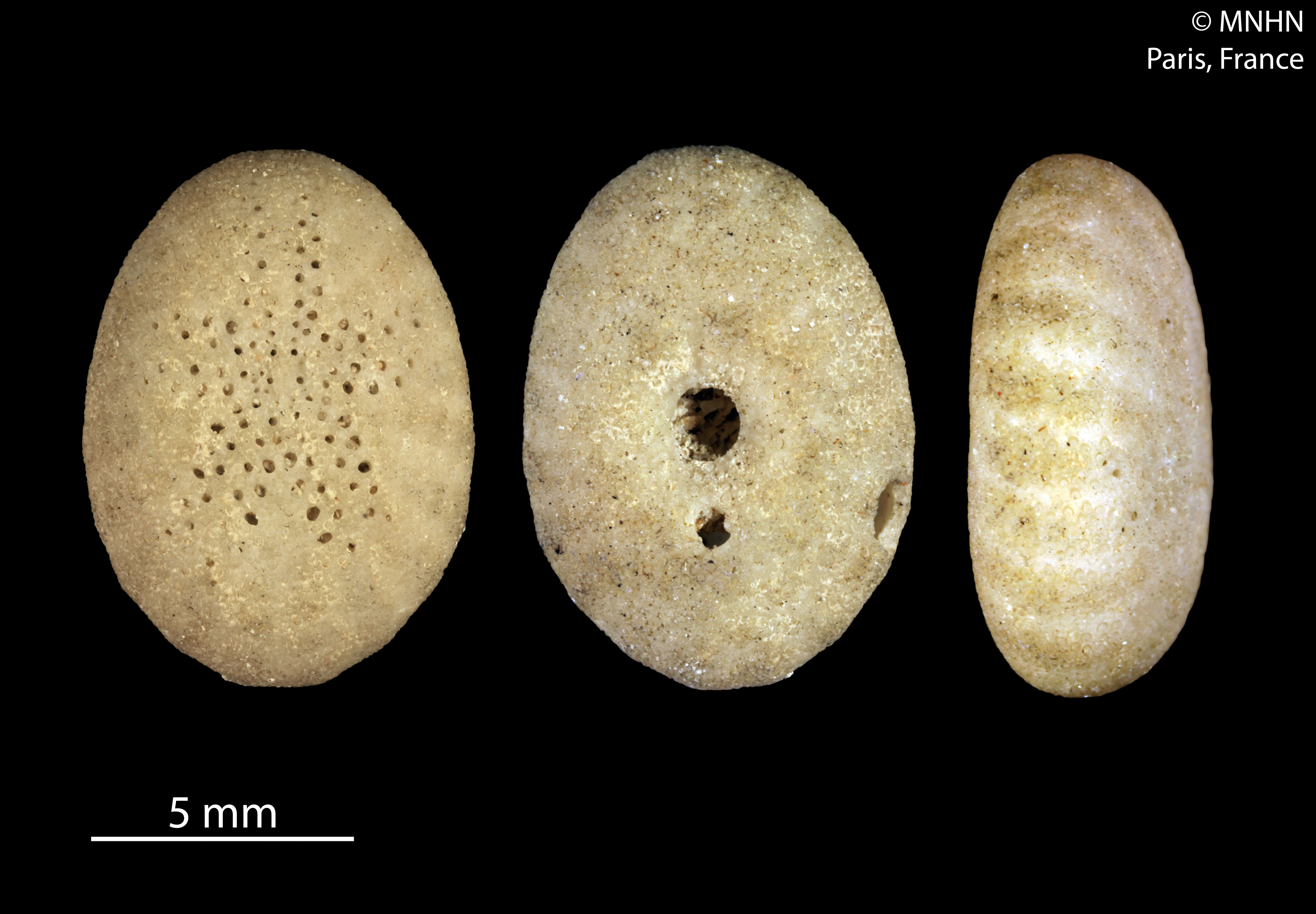
Fibulariella volva

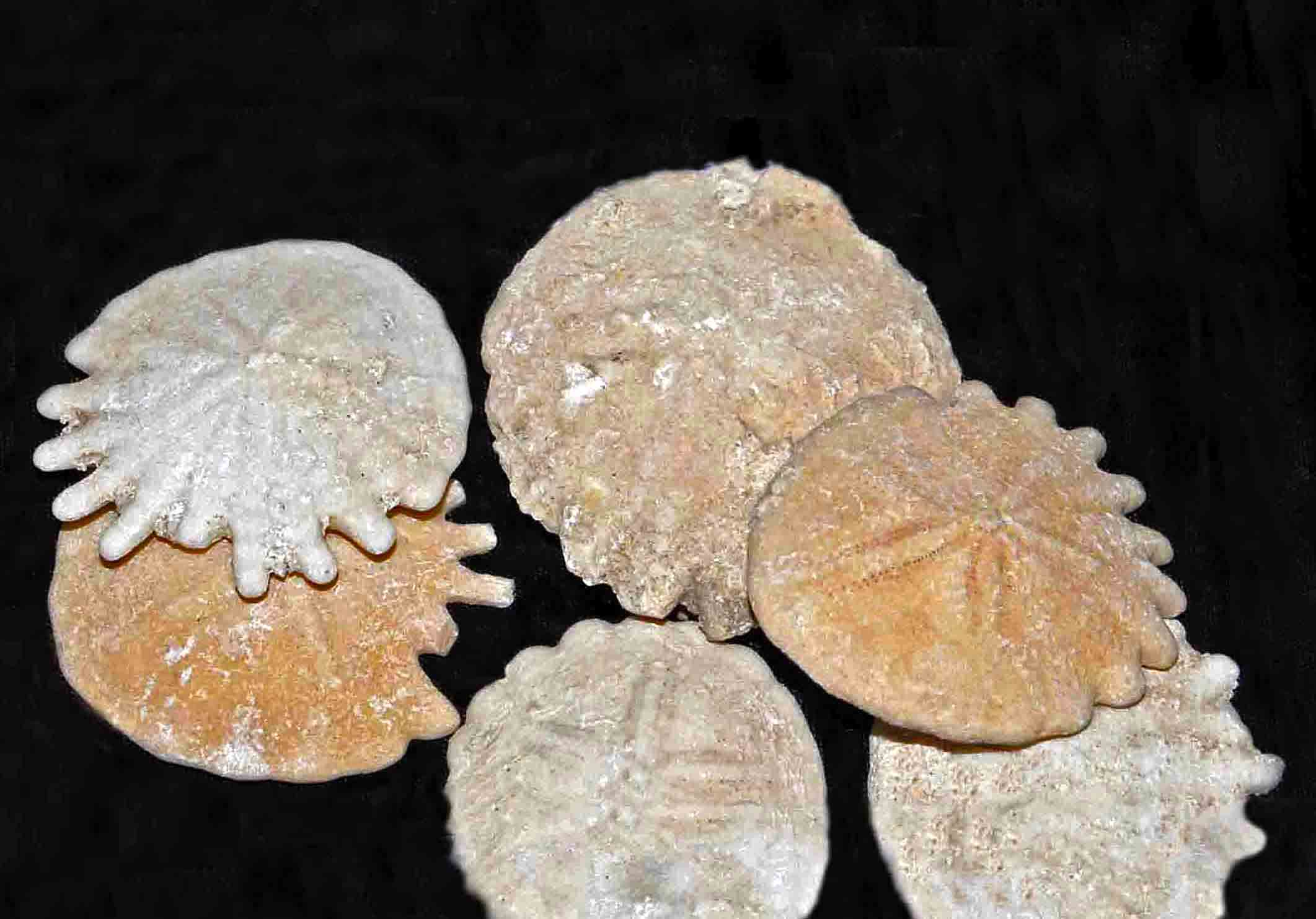
Several specimens of fossile Heliophora (Pliocene).

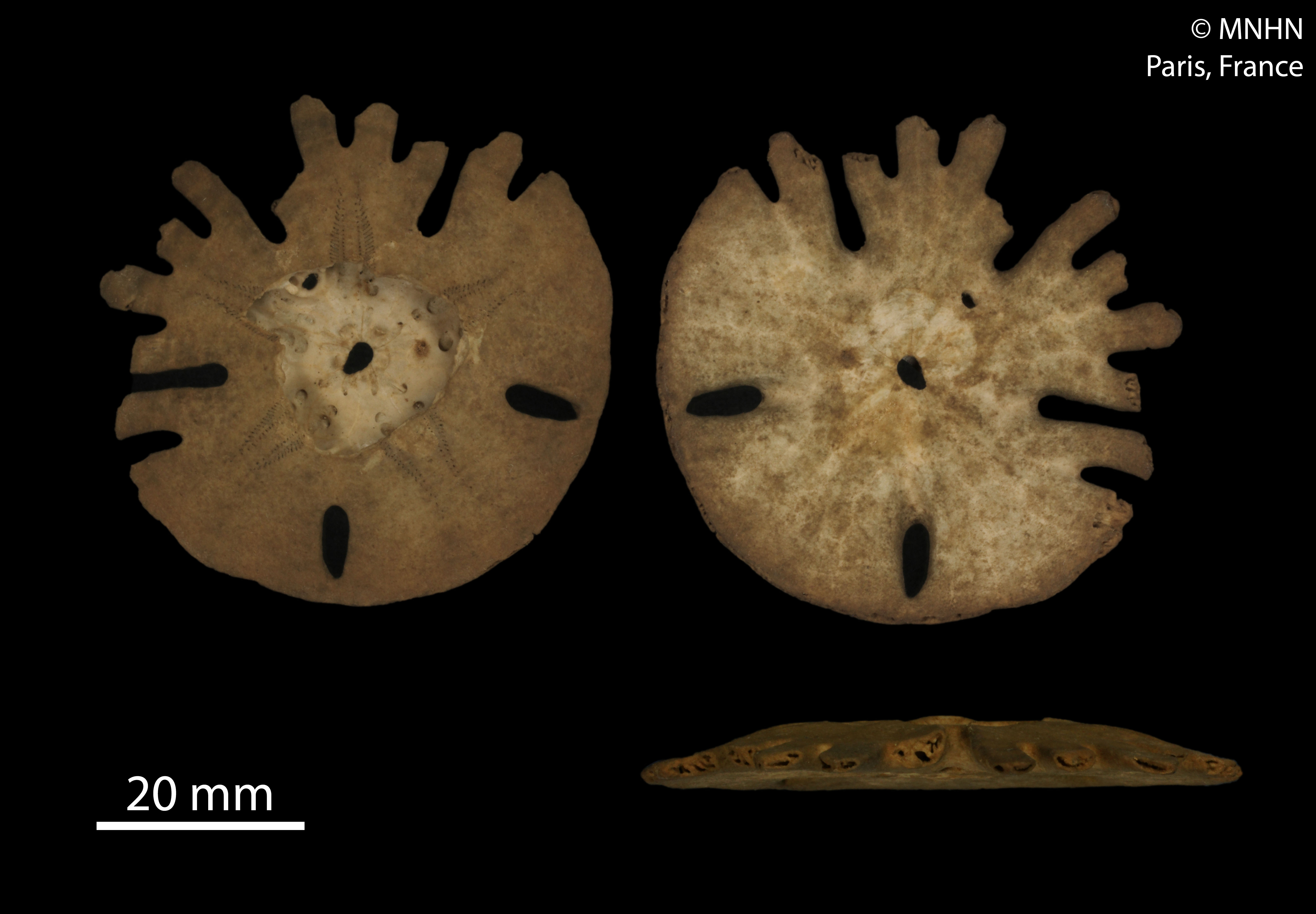
Rotula deciesdigitatus (MNHN).

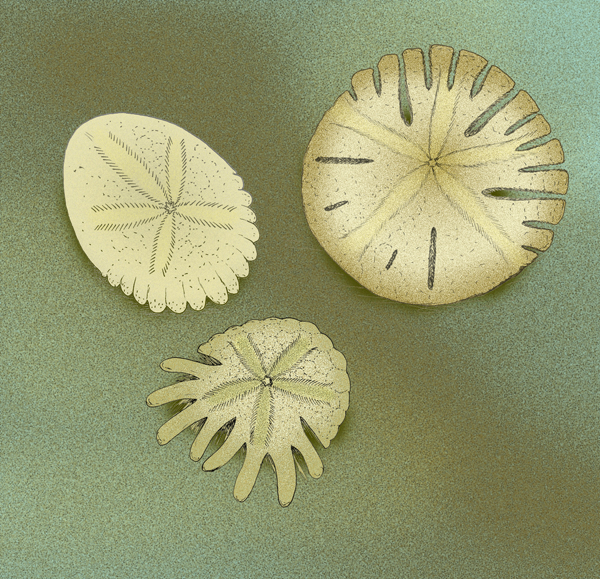
Drawings of Rotuloidea, Rotula, Heliophora
