= Eurypetalum unijugum =

Conservation status
- Vulnerable (IUCN 3.1)

Scientific classification
- Kingdom: Plantae
- Clade: Tracheophytes
- Clade: Angiosperms
- Clade: Eudicots
- Clade: Rosids
- Order: Fabales
- Family: Fabaceae
- Genus: Eurypetalum
- Species: E. unijugum

Binomial name
- Eurypetalum unijugum Harms

Species of legume

Eurypetalum unijugum is a species of plant in the family Fabaceae. It is found only in Cameroon. Its natural habitat is subtropical or tropical moist lowland forests. It is threatened by habitat loss.
