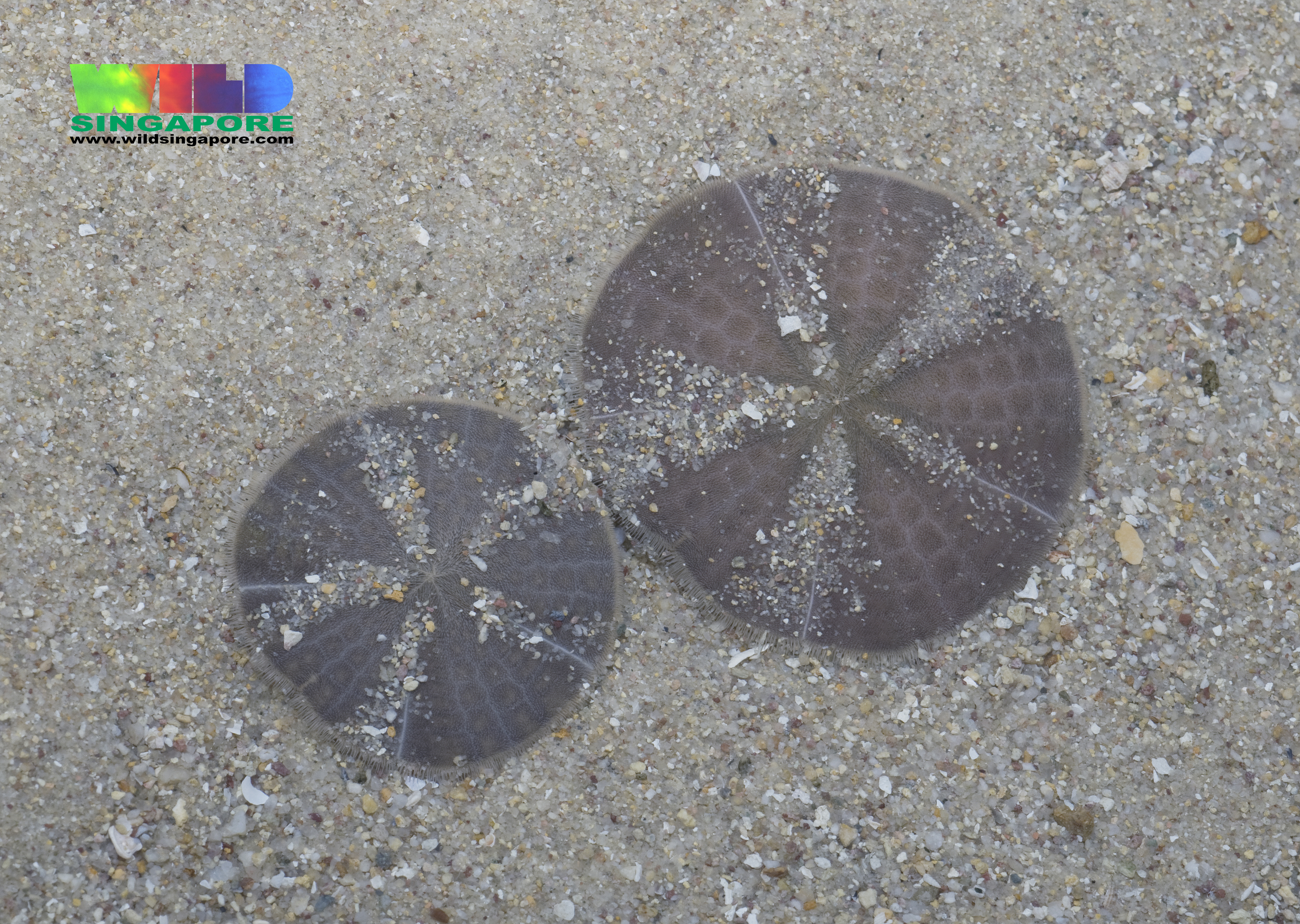

Scientific classification
- Kingdom: Animalia
- Phylum: Echinodermata
- Class: Echinoidea
- Order: Clypeasteroida
- Family: Clypeasteridae
- Genus: Arachnoides
- Species: A. placenta

Binomial name
- Arachnoides placenta (Linnaeus, 1758)

= Arachnoides placenta =

Species of sea urchin

Arachnoides placenta is a species of sea urchin of the family Clypeasteridae. Their armour is covered with spines. It is placed in the genus Arachnoides and lives in the sea. Arachnoides placenta was first scientifically described in 1758 by Carl Linnaeus.
