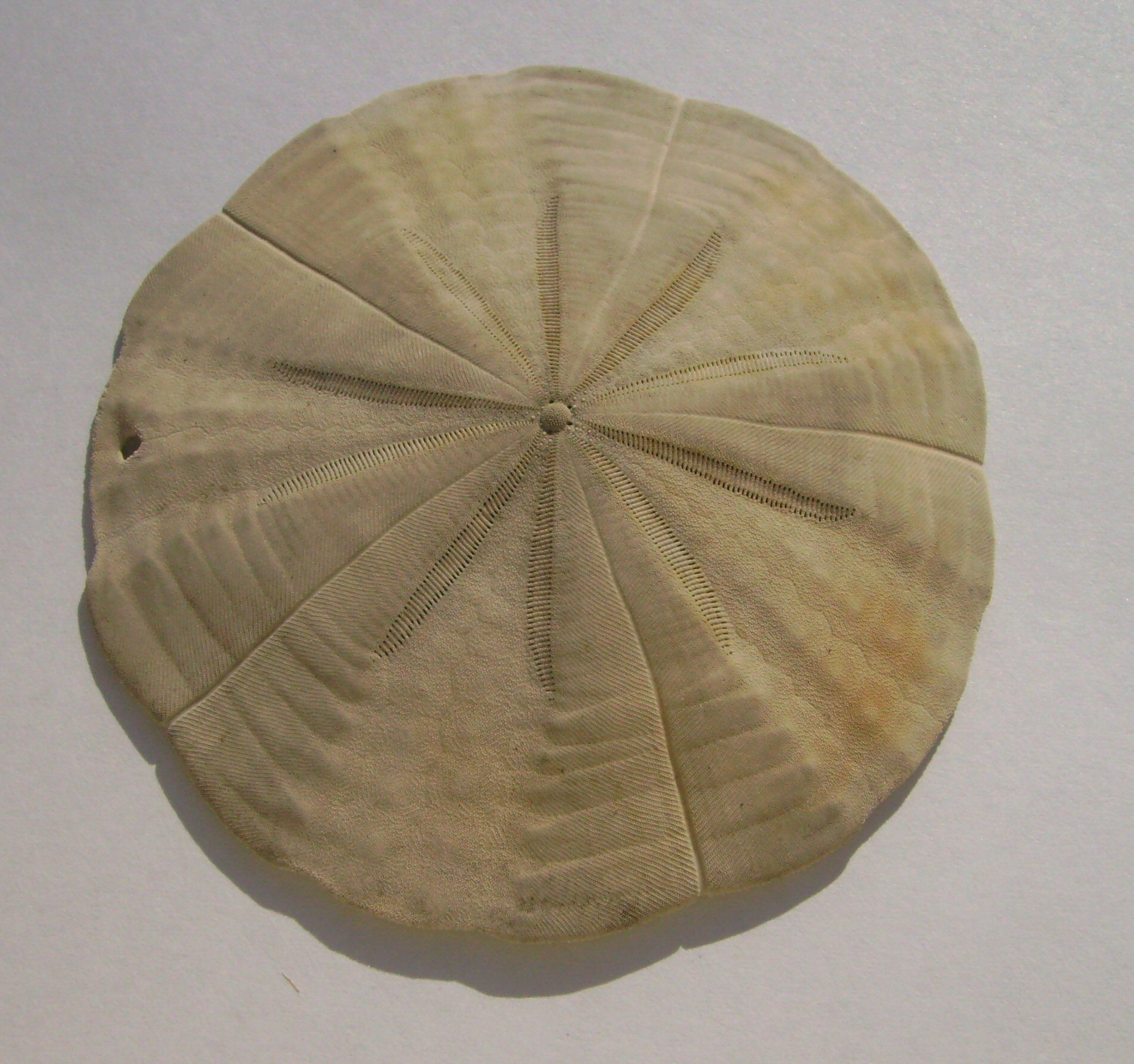

Scientific classification
- Kingdom: Animalia
- Phylum: Echinodermata
- Class: Echinoidea
- Order: Clypeasteroida
- Family: Clypeasteridae
- Genus: Fellaster
- Species: F. zelandiae

Binomial name
- Fellaster zelandiae (Gray, 1855)

Synonyms
- Arachnoides zelandiae Gray, 1855

= Fellaster zelandiae =

Species of sea urchin

Fellaster zelandiae, which is also called a cake urchin, or the snapper biscuit, is an echinoderm of the family Arachnoididae, endemic to New Zealand. The maximum width of this type of echinoderm is 100 mm.

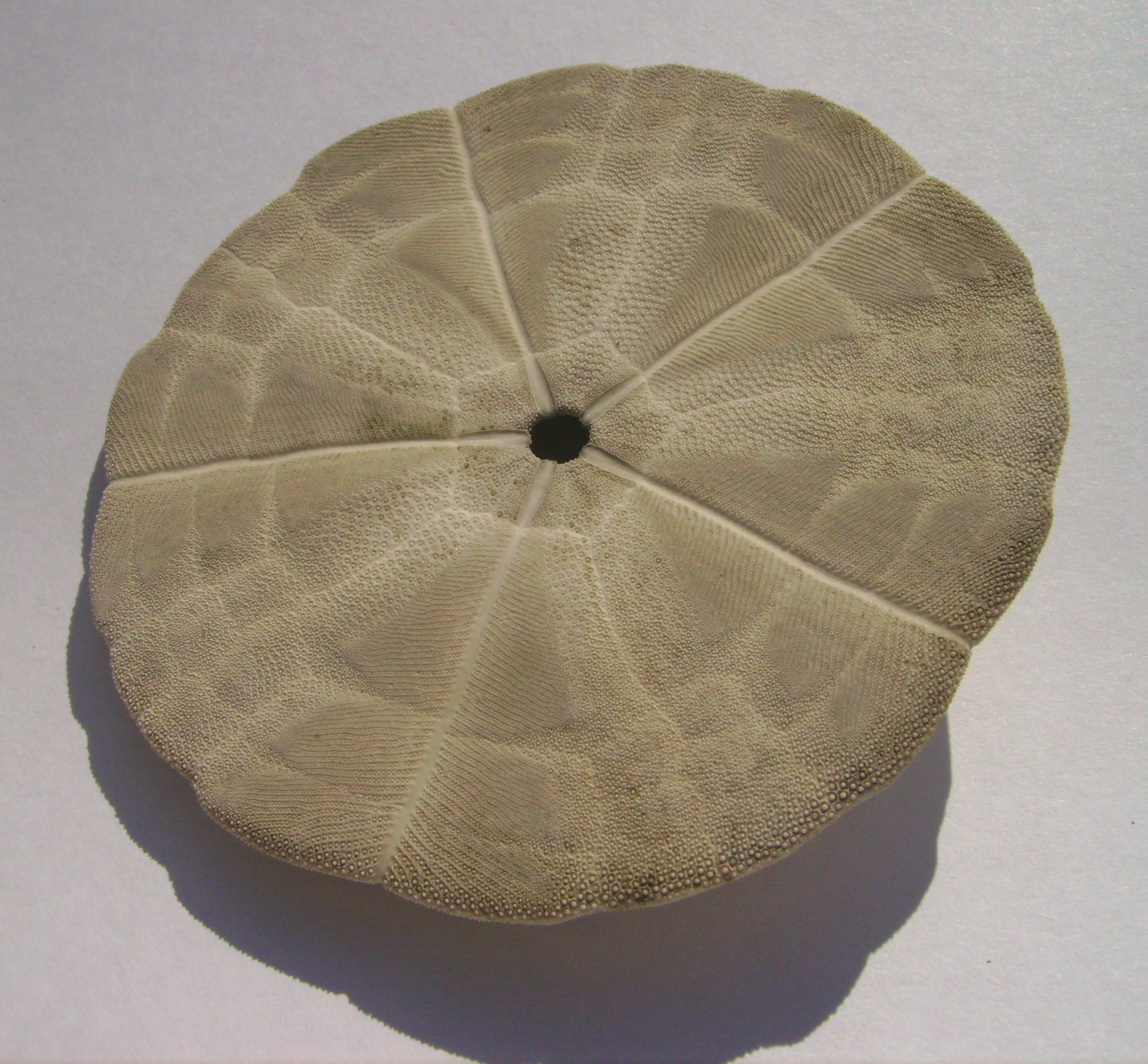
Arachnoides zelandiae underside
