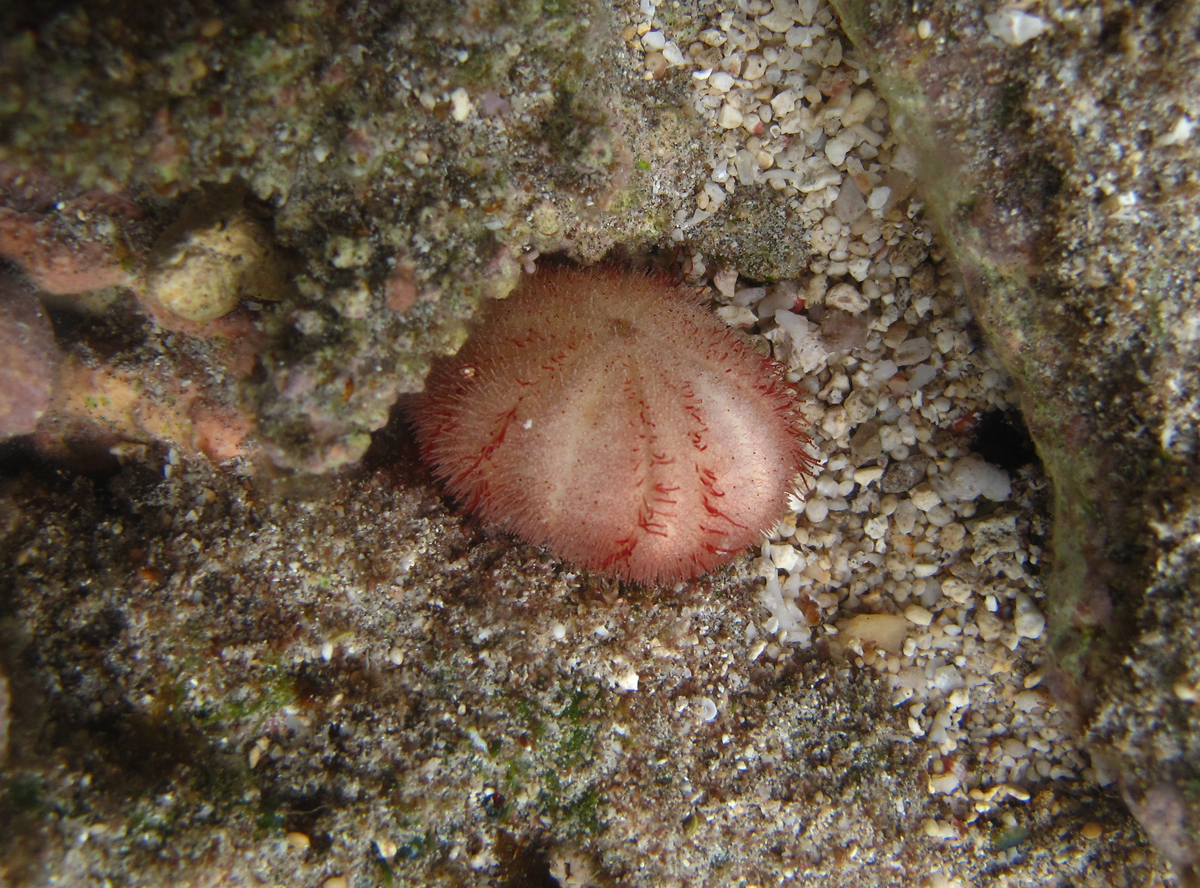
- Echinoneus cyclostomus

Scientific classification
- Kingdom: Animalia
- Phylum: Echinodermata
- Class: Echinoidea
- Order: Echinoneoida
- Family: Echinoneidae
- Genus: Echinoneus; Leske, 1778

= Echinoneus =

Genus of sea urchins

Echinoneus is a genus of echinoderms belonging to the family Echinoneidae.

The genus has almost cosmopolitan distribution.

Species:

- Echinoneus burgeri Grant & Hertlein, 1938
- Echinoneus cyclostomus Leske, 1778
- Echinoneus robustus Sánchez Roig, 1953
- Echinoneus rojasi Sánchez Roig, 1952
- Echinoneus sanchezi Lambert, 1928
- Echinoneus tenuipetalum Sánchez Roig, 1952
