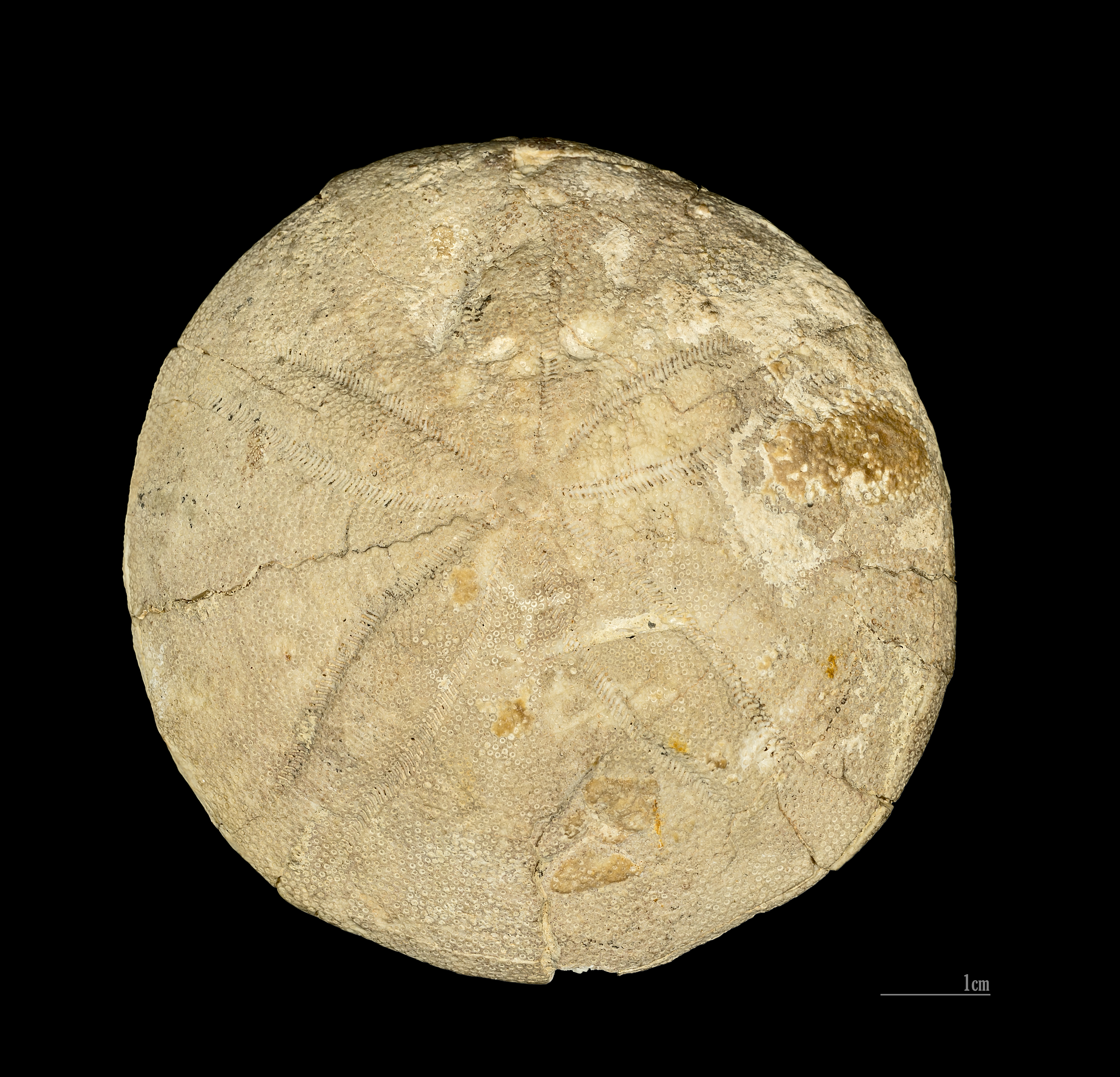
- Echinolampas hemisphaerica MHNT Burdigalien Bollene 84 dos

Scientific classification
- Kingdom: Animalia
- Phylum: Echinodermata
- Class: Echinoidea
- Order: Cassiduloida
- Family: Echinolampadidae

= Echinolampadidae =

Family of sea urchins

Echinolampadidae is a family of cassiduloid echinoids.

The following genera are assigned to this genus:

- Arnaudaster
- Calilampas Squires & Demetrion, 1996
- Conolampas A. Agassiz, 1883
- Conolampus A. Agassiz, 1883
- Echinolampas Gray, 1825
- Heteroclypeus Cotteau, 1891
- Hypsoclypus Pomel, 1869
- Hypsoheteroclypus Szörenyi, 1953
- Kephrenia Fourtau, 1909
- Palaeolampas Bell, 1880
- Parapygus
- Planilampas Mortensen, 1948
- Pleisiolampas
- Plesiolampas Pomel, 1883
- Progonolampas Bittner, 1892
- Vologesia Cotteau & Gauthier, 1895
