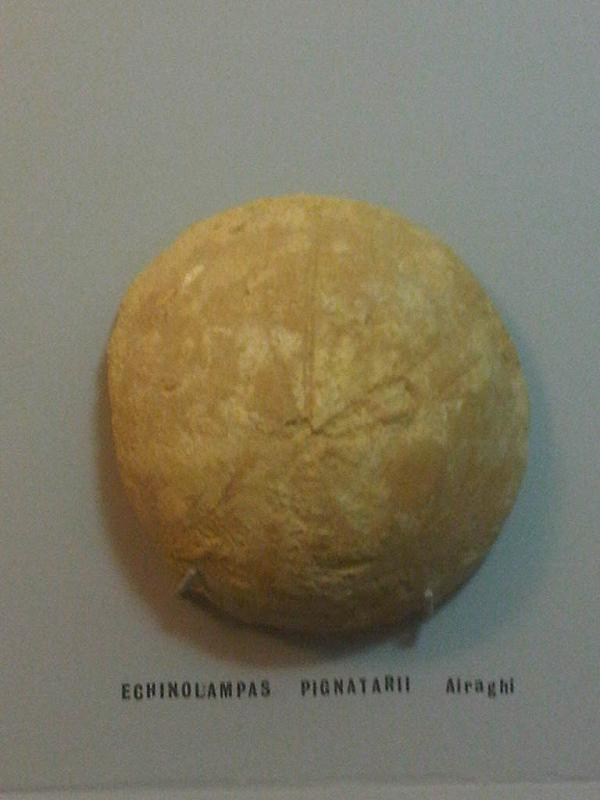
- Echinolampas chiesai

Scientific classification
- Kingdom: Animalia
- Phylum: Echinodermata
- Class: Echinoidea
- Order: Cassiduloida
- Family: Echinolampadidae
- Genus: Echinolampas; Gray, 1825

= Echinolampas =

Genus of sea urchins

Echinolampas is a genus of echinoderms belonging to the family Echinolampadidae.

The genus has cosmopolitan distribution.

Species:

- Echinolampas africana de Loriol, 1880
- Echinolampas aldrichi Clark & Twitchell, 1915
- Echinolampas alexandri de Loriol, 1876
- Echinolampas altissima Arnold & H.L. Clark, 1927
- Echinolampas anceps Lambert, 1905
- Echinolampas andalusiensis Osborn et al., 2016
- Echinolampas anguillae Cotteau, 1875
- Echinolampas antunesi Gonçalves, 1971
- Echinolampas appendiculatus Emmons, 1858
- Echinolampas atascaderensis Brighton, 1926
- Echinolampas atropha Lambert, 1906
- Echinolampas barcensis Tavani, 1946
- Echinolampas bastai Elattaar & Strougo, 2001
- Echinolampas bombos Nisiyama, 1968
- Echinolampas bonomii Venzo, 1934
- Echinolampas bothriopygoides Lambert, 1937
- Echinolampas brachytona Arnold & H.L. Clark, 1927
- Echinolampas camagueyensis Weisbord, 1934
- Echinolampas caranoi Checchia-Rispoli, 1950
- Echinolampas castroi Cotteau, 1881
- Echinolampas cavaionensis Venzo, 1935
- Echinolampas checchiai Roman, 1965
- Echinolampas chiesai Airaghi, 1939
- Echinolampas chuni (Döderlein, 1905)
- Echinolampas clevei Cotteau, 1875
- Echinolampas cojimarensis Sánchez Roig, 1949
- Echinolampas complanatus Abich, 1857
- Echinolampas concavus Hayasaka, 1948
- Echinolampas consolationis Sánchez Roig, 1953
- Echinolampas cookei Srivastava & Singh, 1999
- Echinolampas crassa (Bell, 1880)
- Echinolampas cuvillieri Lambert, 1936
- Echinolampas daguini Castex, 1930
- Echinolampas daralagezensis Poretskaya, 1974a
- Echinolampas delorenzoi Mirigliano, 1938
- Echinolampas depressa Gray, 1851
- Echinolampas deserticus Desio, 1929
- Echinolampas dorsalis L. Agassiz, 1847a
- Echinolampas dubaleni Castex, 1930
- Echinolampas ellipsoidalis d'Archiac, 1846
- Echinolampas eocenicus Sánchez Roig, 1953
- Echinolampas fraasi de Loriol, 1880
- Echinolampas garciai Sánchez Roig, 1952
- Echinolampas garoensis Srivastava, Singh, Tiwari & Jauhri, 2008
- Echinolampas gigas Sánchez Roig, 1953
- Echinolampas gignouxi Lambert, 1933
- Echinolampas globulossus Sánchez Roig, 1952
- Echinolampas gregoryi
- Echinolampas guvarensis Srivastava & Singh, 1999
- Echinolampas hanguensis Davies, 1943
- Echinolampas hemisphaerica (Lamarck, 1816)
- Echinolampas jacquemonti d'Archiac & Haime, 1853
- Echinolampas jacqueti Lambert, 1936
- Echinolampas jigniensis Srivastava, Mishra & Srivastava, 1992
- Echinolampas keiensis (Mortensen, 1948)
- Echinolampas khariensis Srivastava & Singh, 1999
- Echinolampas koreana H.L. Clark, 1925
- Echinolampas kugleri Jeannet, 1959
- Echinolampas lakiensis Sarwar, 1988
- Echinolampas laubei McNamara, 1989
- Echinolampas leymeriei Cotteau, 1853
- Echinolampas liae Tavani, 1939
- Echinolampas lipiformis Srivastava & Singh, 1999
- Echinolampas lycopersicus Guppy, 1866
- Echinolampas macrostoma Lambert, 1936
- Echinolampas madurensis Martin, 1919
- Echinolampas marcaisi Lambert, 1937
- Echinolampas marioi Roman, 1965
- Echinolampas menchikoffi Lambert, 1935
- Echinolampas mestrei Sánchez Roig, 1926
- Echinolampas migiurtinus Checchia-Rispoli, 1950
- Echinolampas migliorinii Checchia-Rispoli, 1950
- Echinolampas migliorinii Venzo, 1934
- Echinolampas moronensis Sánchez Roig, 1953
- Echinolampas munozi Sánchez Roig, 1949
- Echinolampas neuvillei Castex, 1930
- Echinolampas nuevitasensis Weisbord, 1934
- Echinolampas omanensis Clegg, 1933
- Echinolampas ovata (Leske, 1778)
- Echinolampas paraensis Marchesini Santos, 1958
- Echinolampas paragoga Arnold & H.L. Clark, 1927
- Echinolampas parvula Lambert, 1936
- Echinolampas percrassus Meznerics, 1941
- Echinolampas perrieri de Loriol, 1880
- Echinolampas peyroti Castex, 1930
- Echinolampas pipurensis Srivastava & Singh, 1999
- Echinolampas posterocrassa Gregory, 1890
- Echinolampas pyramidalis Abich, 1857
- Echinolampas qattamiaensis Ali, 1983
- Echinolampas rangii Desmoulins, 1837
- Echinolampas raulini Cotteau, 1863
- Echinolampas rhodiensis Venzo, 1934
- Echinolampas rollandil Lambert, 1931
- Echinolampas rombellipsoidalis Thirring, 1936
- Echinolampas rotundus Mamedov & Melikov, 1976
- Echinolampas sandiegensis Sánchez Roig, 1953
- Echinolampas santaclarae Sánchez Roig, 1951
- Echinolampas schultzi Kroh, 2005
- Echinolampas semiorbis Guppy, 1866
- Echinolampas sternopetala A. Agassiz & H.L. Clark, 1907
- Echinolampas strongyla Arnold & H.L. Clark, 1927
- Echinolampas subnucleus Venzo, 1934
- Echinolampas subrostratus Gregory, 1892
- Echinolampas sumatrana Döderlein, 1905
- Echinolampas tachanabatensis Mamedov & Melikov, 1976
- Echinolampas tandoni Srivastava & Singh, 1999
- Echinolampas tanypetalis Harper & Shaak, 1974
- Echinolampas tenuipetalum Sánchez Roig, 1952
- Echinolampas torrense Sánchez Roig, 1953
- Echinolampas tumulus McNamara & Kendrick, 1994
- Echinolampas umbella Palmer, 1949
- Echinolampas vadaszi Roman, 1965
- Echinolampas valettei Lambert, 1933
- Echinolampas venzoi Roman, 1965
- Echinolampas visedoi Lambert, 1935
- Echinolampas woodi Currie, 1930
- Echinolampas woodringi Durham, 1961
- Echinolampas yadongensis Mu & Wu, 1976
- Echinolampas yoshiwarai Loriol, 1902
