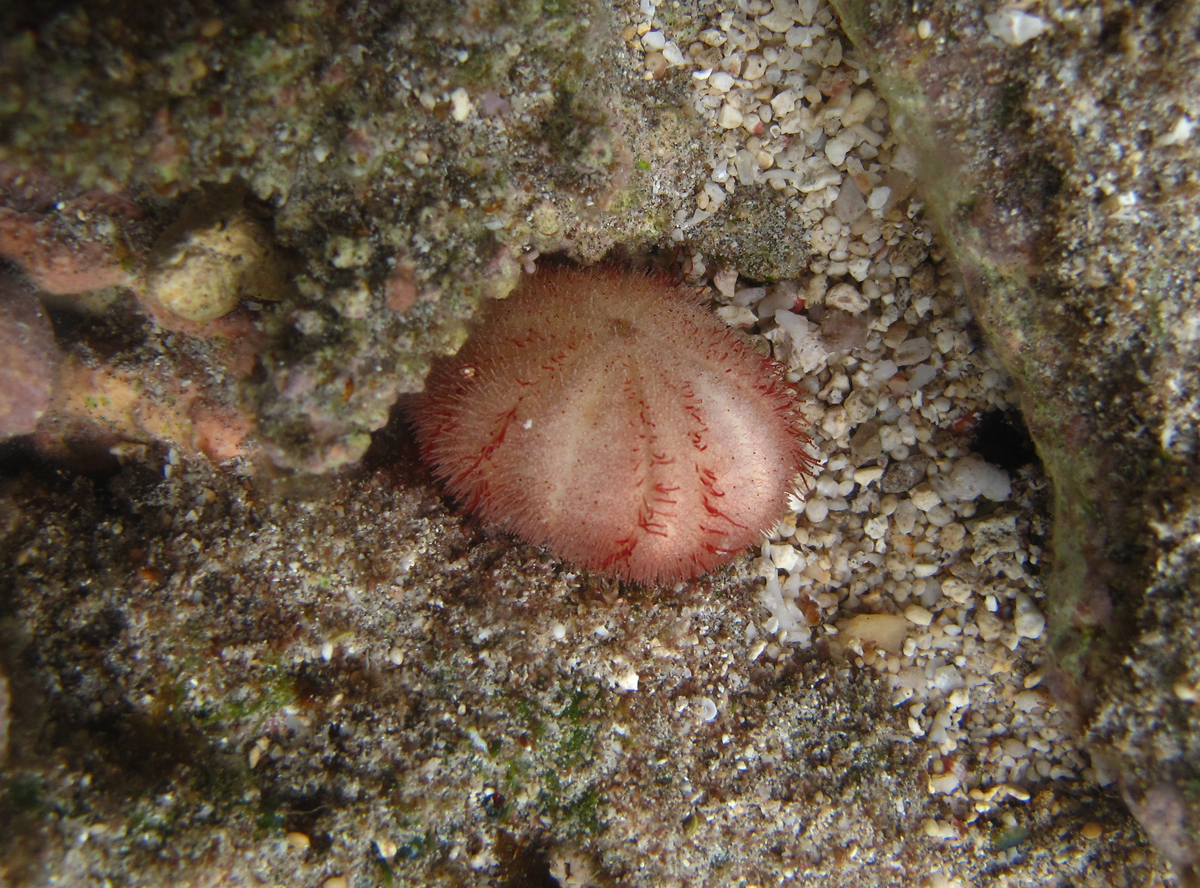
- Echinoneus cyclostomus

Scientific classification
- Kingdom: Animalia
- Phylum: Echinodermata
- Class: Echinoidea
- Order: Echinoneoida

= Echinoneoida =

Order of sea urchins

Echinoneoida is an order of echinoderms belonging to the class Echinoidea.

Families:

- Conulidae
- Echinoneidae
- Galeritidae
- Neoglobatoridae
