= Diplopodia =

Congenital anamoly in tetrapods

Diplopodia is a congenital anomaly in tetrapods that involves duplication of elements of the foot on the hind limb. It comes from the Greek roots diplo = "double" and pod = "foot". Diplopodia is often found in conjunction with other structural abnormalities and can be lethal. It is more extreme than polydactyly, the presence of extra digits.

== Description ==
The affected leg usually has one foot that is in an approximately normal position. The extra foot is composed of at least some metatarsal or tarsal bones and extra digits, though it is usually not complete. The feet can be joined together, so that the limb appears to have one large foot, or the extra foot can be joined to the limb separately, usually above the level of the other foot. Diplopodia affects one or both of the hind limbs.

== Causes ==
Recessive alleles of some genes involved in embryonic limb patterning produce bilateral diplopodia, and diplopodia can be experimentally induced in early embryos. Many instances of diplopodia in humans have no apparent cause.

People have been able to produce diplopod limbs by increasing sonic hedgehog (shh) signaling in the limb buds of embryos. The zone of polarizing activity (ZPA) in the proximal posterior mesoderm of a tetrapod limb bud is responsible for maintaining the anterior-posterior axis of the growing limb. The ZPA secretes shh protein, which induces formation of the distal segment of the limb, or autopod, with its posterior side facing the ZPA. When ZPA cells, non-ZPA cells made to express shh, or simply shh protein-soaked beads are implanted in the anterior side of a limb bud, the end of the resulting limb is duplicated, as in diplopodia. The posterior autopod on that limb has the normal orientation, and the extra, anterior autopod has a reversed anterior-posterior axis. This is because the original ZPA and the added source of shh signaling each induce the formation of an autopod.

== Diplopodia in humans ==
Diplopodia is often found in combination with aplasia or hypoplasia of the tibia. Sometimes, the tibia is replaced by another fibula The extra foot is almost always joined to the normal foot, though a case was described where a nearly complete extra foot joined to the back of the ankle.

== Diplopodia in chickens ==
People have identified five recessive lethal mutations in chickens that cause bilateral diplopodia. The genes are numbered in the order of their discoveries, with the symbols dp-1, dp-2, dp-3, dp-4, and dp-5.

Chickens normally have an anisodactyl toe arrangement, with one short toe pointing backwards and three long toes pointing forwards. In diplopodia, the feet usually lack the normal hind toe and instead develop two to four extra toes at various positions between the hock joint and the front toes. The toes are almost always connected to extra tarso-metatarsal bones, though sometimes the toes do not contain any bone. Embryos with diplopodia have been found with numbers of digits on one wing ranging from one to seven, while normal embryos have three digits per wing. Diplopod limb buds first differ visibly from normal limb buds by their abnormally thick and long apical ectodermal ridges. Diplopodia usually delays the embryonic growth of cartilage, bone, and tendon by two days, particularly in the limbs. Other characteristics frequently seen in diplopodia mutants are shortened wings and legs, short upper beak, and smaller embryo size. Many embryos reach the final embryonic stage but then are unable to hatch, though, diplopod embryos can occasionally hatch and mature.

Single diplopodia mutations produce wide ranges of phenotypes sharing these general characteristics and can even affect individual chickens' left and right legs differently. The ranges of phenotypes produced by the different mutations also overlap broadly, so diplopodia mutations sometimes need to be distinguished by their phenotype distributions. Dr. Ursula Abbott has extensively studied the phenotypes and descriptions of the first four diplopodia mutations and has ranked them from least severe to most severe: dp-3, dp-1, dp-4, dp-2.

Diplopodia-1

This autosomal mutation gives homozygotes duplicated wing tips and feet in front of the usual structures, as in the experimentally induced diplopodia described above. However, unlike the experimentally manipulated embryos, these embryos show no change in shh expression. The embryos express hoxd-11, hoxd-12, hoxd-13, Bmp-2, and Fgf-4 along the whole edge of each limb bud, even though these genes are normally only expressed at the posterior edge.

Diplopodia-2

This is an autosomal trait that gives a very extreme diplopod phenotype, with up to eight toes on a foot. In some embryos, the two outer front toes on each foot are joined together. The trait is now extinct and was never fully characterized.

Diplopodia-3

This is an autosomal trait that may be the least severe of the five.

Diplopodia-4

This sex-linked mutation is similar to the previous mutations, but causes the embryo to grow thicker wing bones.

Diplopodia-5

This is an autosomal mutation that gives embryos webbing between the inner two front toes on each foot, in addition to the usual characteristics of diplopodia. Almost all of the embryos survive to the end of incubation, but they are unable to clear the fluid from their lungs or absorb the blood from their extraembryonic vessels. These problems always prevent them from hatching. Almost all diplopodia-5 embryos have only one or two extra toes on each foot, so this mutation causes the least extreme foot malformation.

== See also ==
- Limb development
- Congenital abnormality
- Dysmelia
- Sonic hedgehog
- Polydactyly
