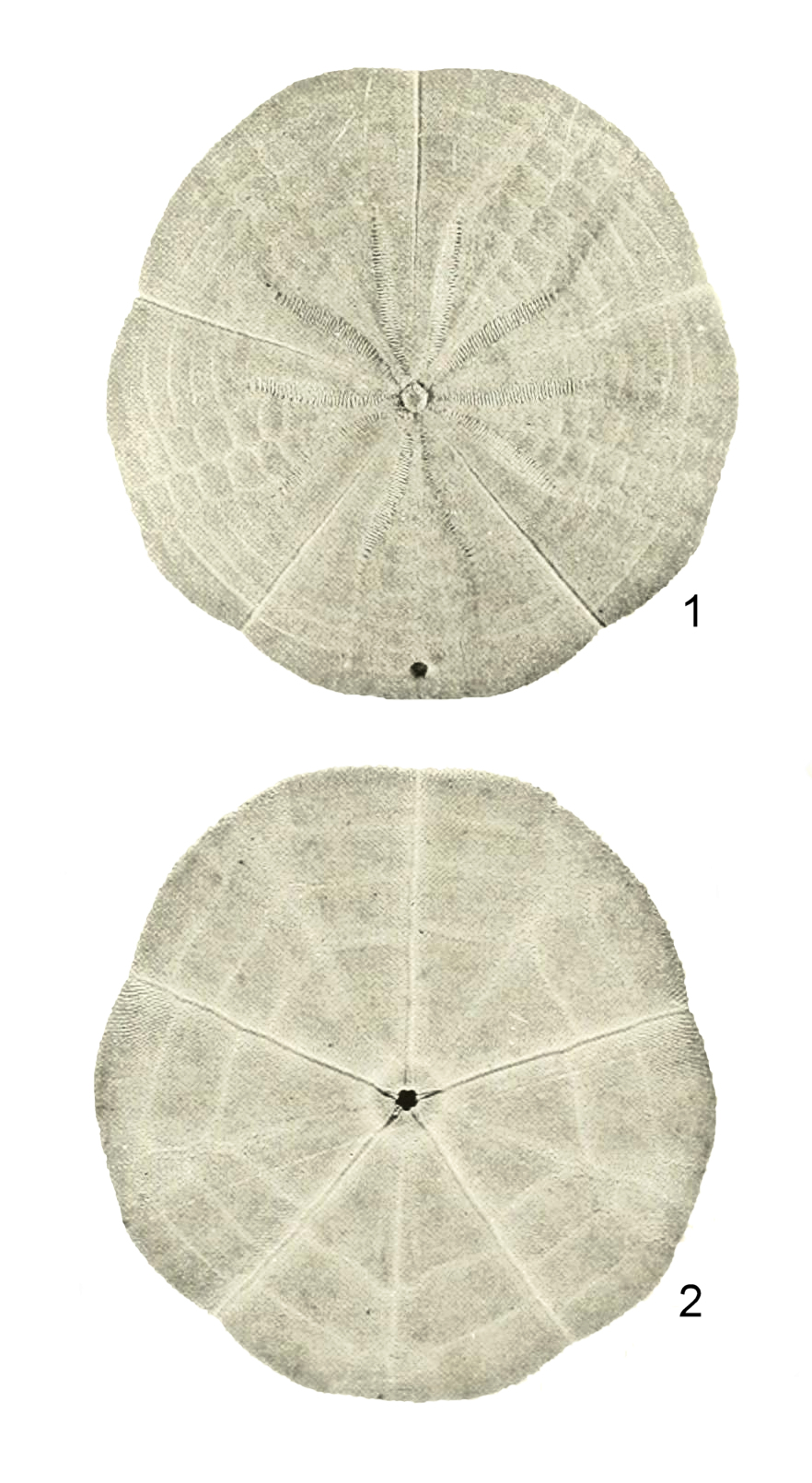
- Arachnoides tenuis

Scientific classification
- Kingdom: Animalia
- Phylum: Echinodermata
- Class: Echinoidea
- Order: Clypeasteroida
- Family: Clypeasteridae
- Genus: Arachnoides; Leske, 1778

Type species
- Echinus placenta Linnaeus, 1758

Species
- See text

= Arachnoides =

Genus of sea urchins

Arachnoides is a genus of sea urchin within the family Clypeasteridae, found in the Indo-Pacific oceans. The base is flat and the upper surface is convex.

== Species ==
The World Register of Marine Species list the following species as being in this genus:-

- Arachnoides placenta (Linnaeus, 1758) Australia to Philippines
- Arachnoides tenuis H. L. Clark, 1938 Western Australia

Arachnoides zelandiae Gray, 1855 New Zealand: Synonym of Fellaster zelandiae (Gray, 1855)
