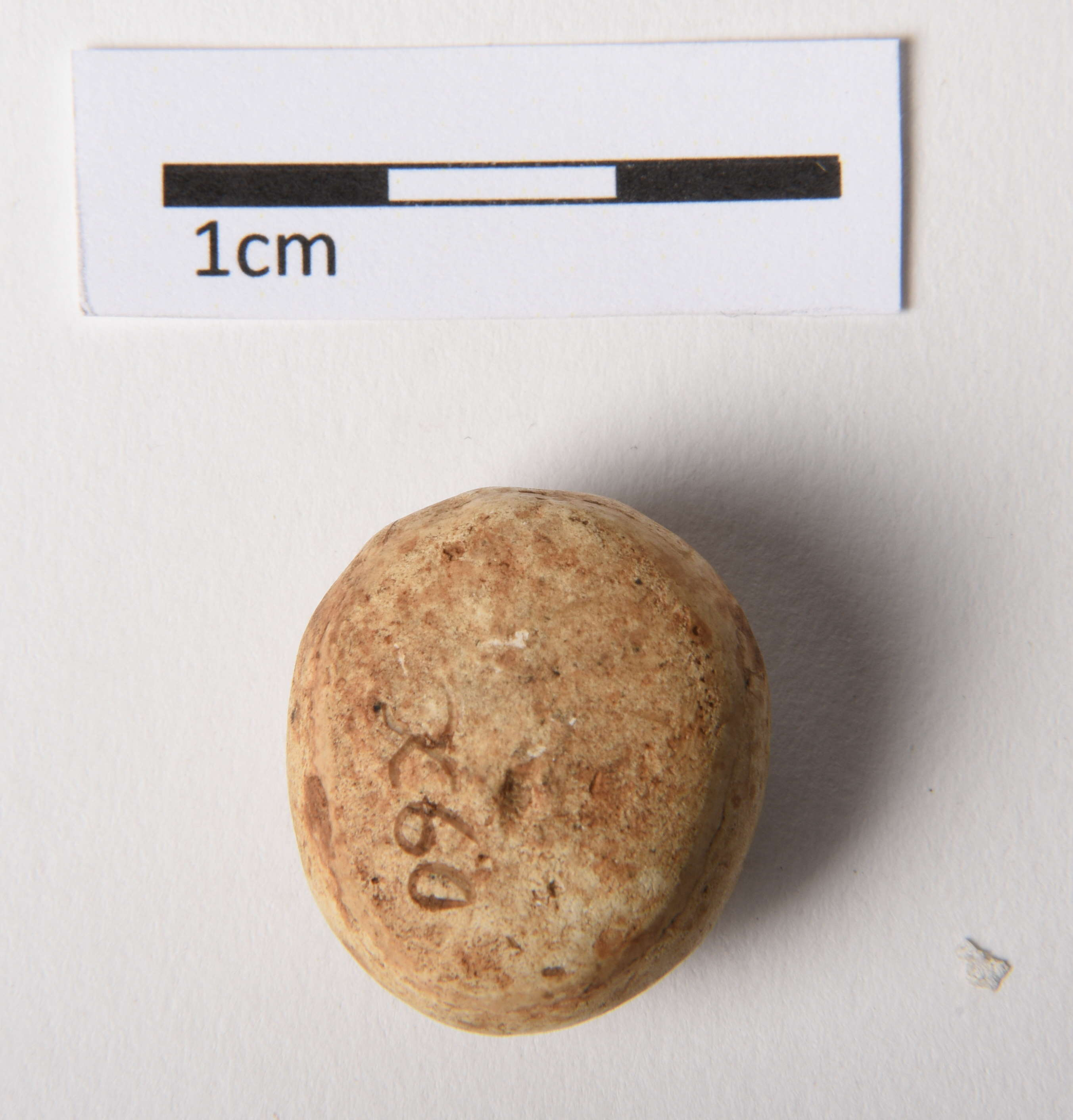
- Catopygus laevis

Scientific classification
- Kingdom: Animalia
- Phylum: Echinodermata
- Class: Echinoidea
- Superorder: Neognathostomata
- Family: Nucleolitidae
- Genus: †Catopygus

Species
- †Catopygus aequalis; †Catopygus rodriguezi

= Catopygus =

Catopygus Temporal range: 112.6–55.8 Ma

Extinct genus of sea urchins

Catopygus is an extinct genus of sea urchins in the family Nucleolitidae.

== See also ==
- List of prehistoric echinoid genera
- List of prehistoric echinoderm genera
