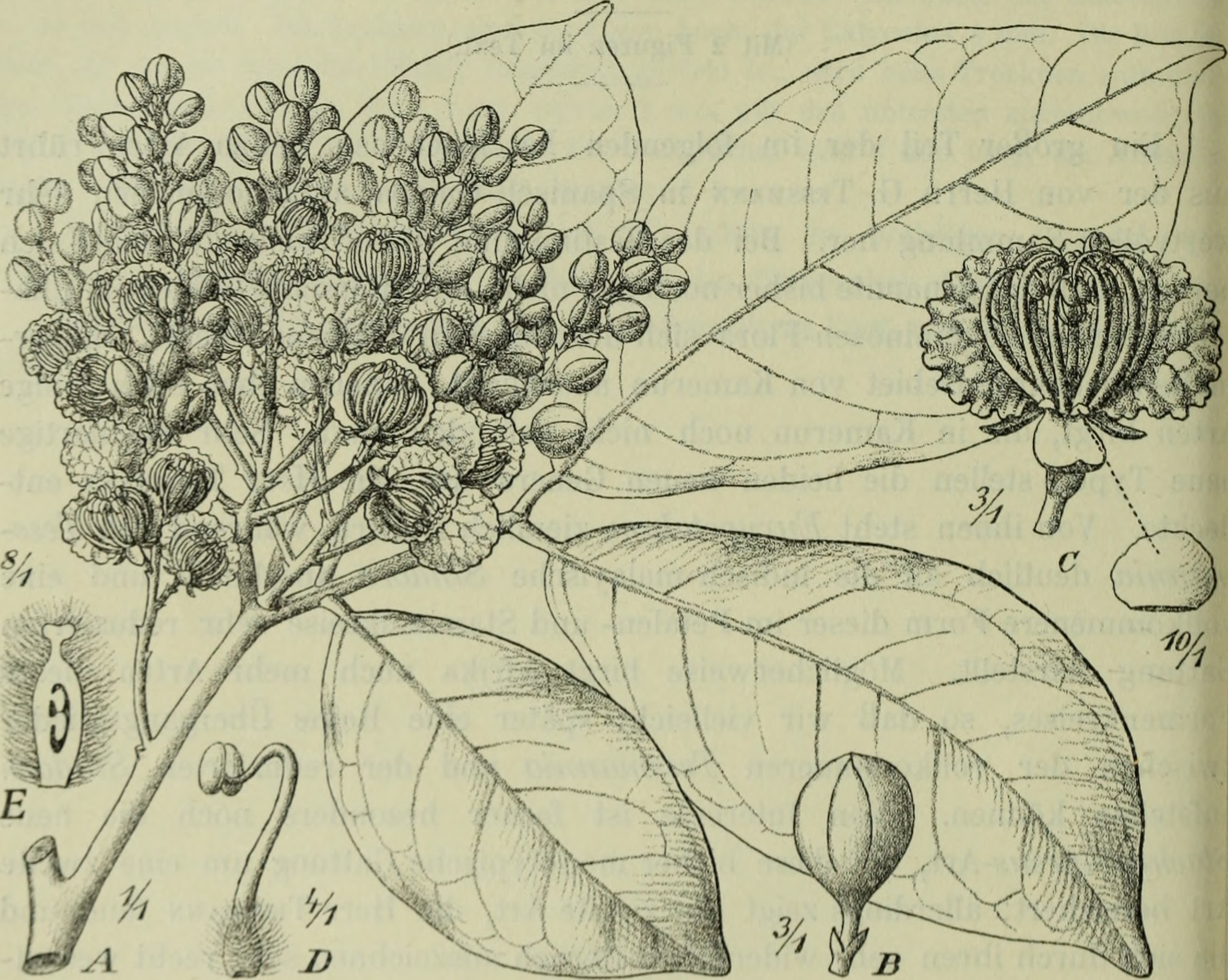
- Eurypetalum tessmannii botanical drawing, 1910

Scientific classification
- Kingdom: Plantae
- Clade: Tracheophytes
- Clade: Angiosperms
- Clade: Eudicots
- Clade: Rosids
- Order: Fabales
- Family: Fabaceae
- Subfamily: Detarioideae
- Tribe: Detarieae
- Genus: Eurypetalum; Harms (1910)

= Eurypetalum =

Genus of legumes

Eurypetalum is a genus of plants in the family Fabaceae. It includes two species of trees native to the Guineo-Congolian forest of southern Cameroon, Gabon, and mainland Equatorial Guinea.

- Eurypetalum tessmannii Harms
- Eurypetalum unijugum Harms
