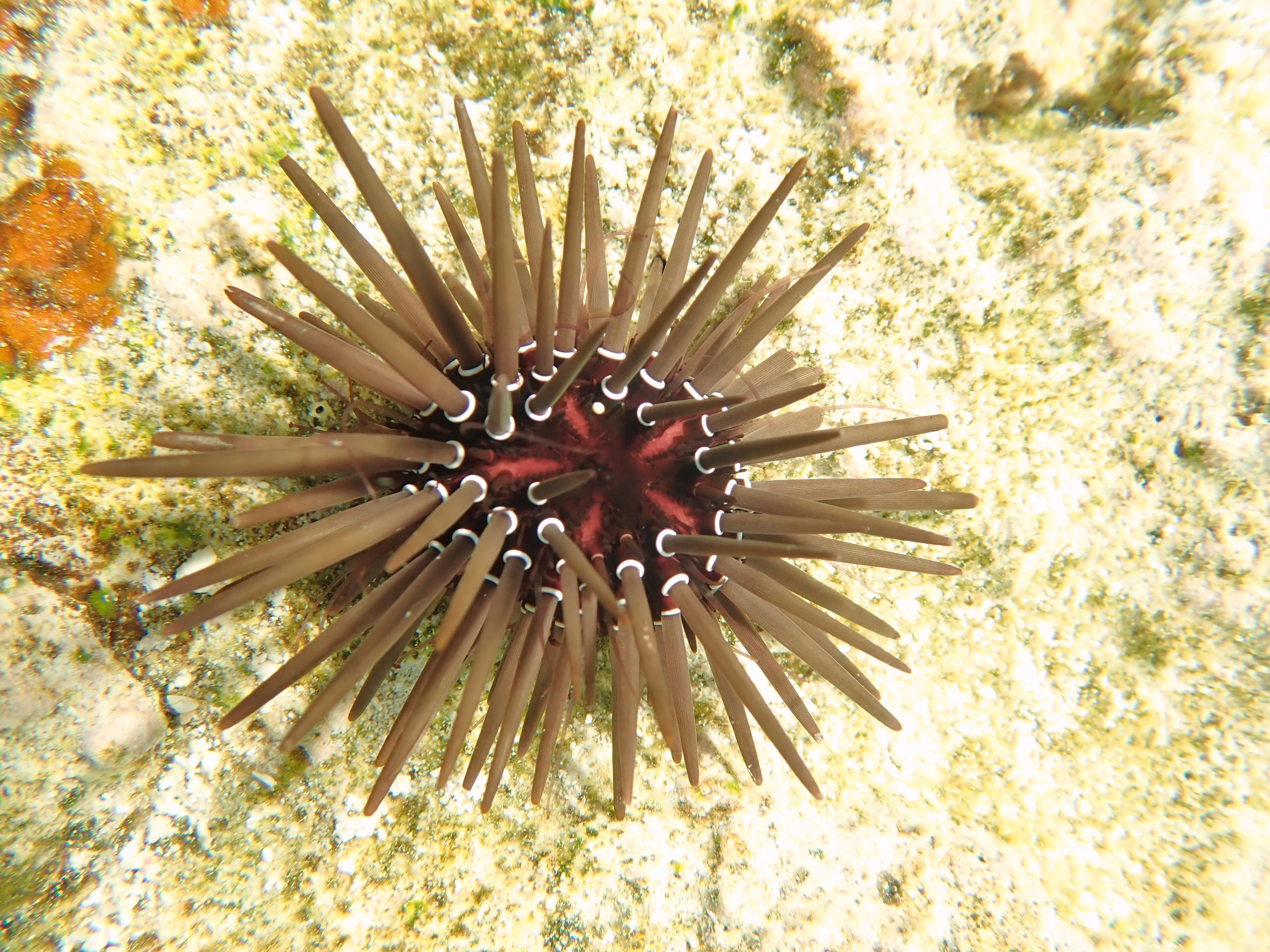
- Parasalenia gratiosa

Scientific classification
- Kingdom: Animalia
- Phylum: Echinodermata
- Class: Echinoidea
- Order: Camarodonta
- Family: Parasaleniidae
- Genus: Parasalenia; A. Agassiz, 1863

= Parasalenia =

Genus of sea urchins

Parasalenia is a genera of echinoderms belonging to the order Camarodonta.

== Species ==
- Parasalenia gratiosa A. Agassiz, 1863
- Parasalenia poehlii Pfeffer, 1887

=== Fossils ===
- † Parasalenia marianae Cooke, 1957
