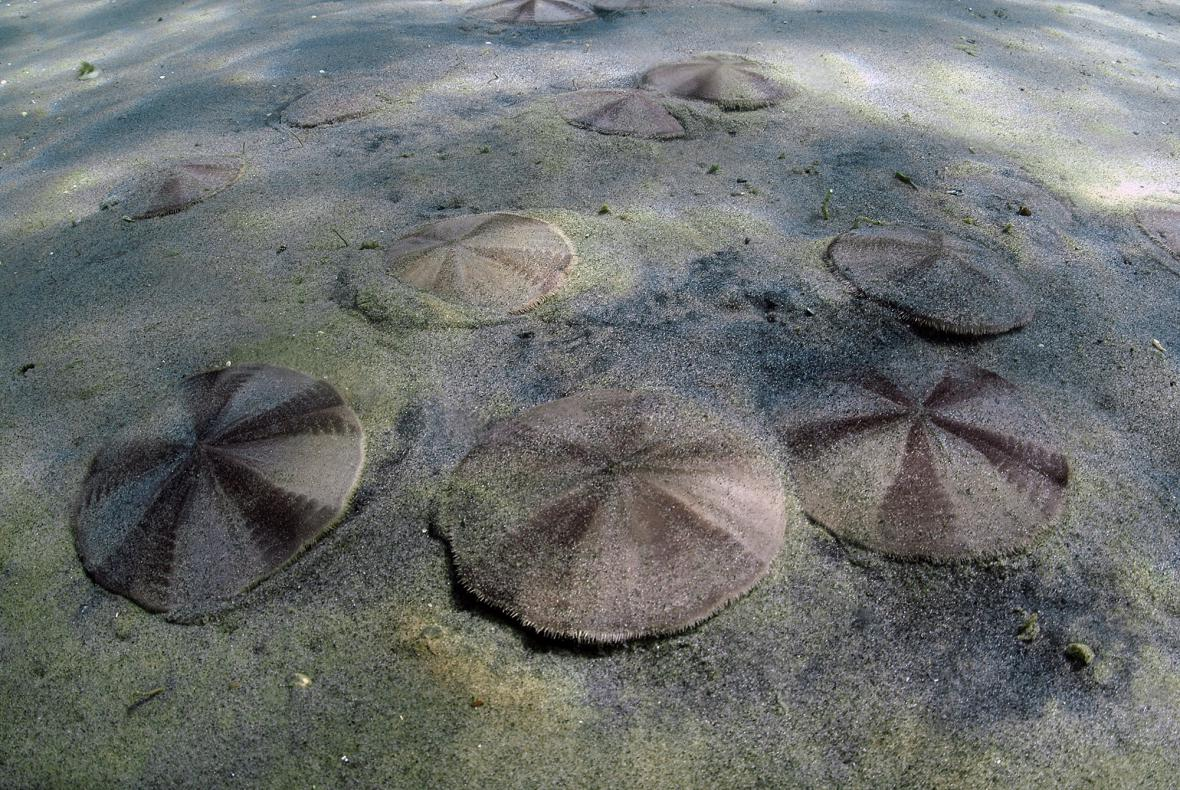
- Pictures of Fellaster zelandiae

Scientific classification
- Kingdom: Animalia
- Phylum: Echinodermata
- Class: Echinoidea
- Order: Clypeasteroida
- Family: Clypeasteridae
- Genus: Fellaster; Durham, 1955

= Fellaster =

Genus of sea urchins

Fellaster is a genus of echinoderms belonging to the family Clypeasteridae.

The species of this genus are found in Australia and New Zealand.

Species:

- Fellaster incisa (Tate, 1893)
- Fellaster zelandiae (Gray, 1855)
