= Plesiolampas =

Plesiolampas Temporal range: Eocene

Scientific classification
- Kingdom: Animalia
- Phylum: Echinodermata
- Class: Echinoidea
- Order: Clypeasteroida
- Genus: †Plesiolampas; Duncan & Sladen, 1882

Extinct genus of sea urchins

Plesiolampas is an extinct genus of echinoids that lived in the Eocene. Its remains have been found in Africa and Asia.
