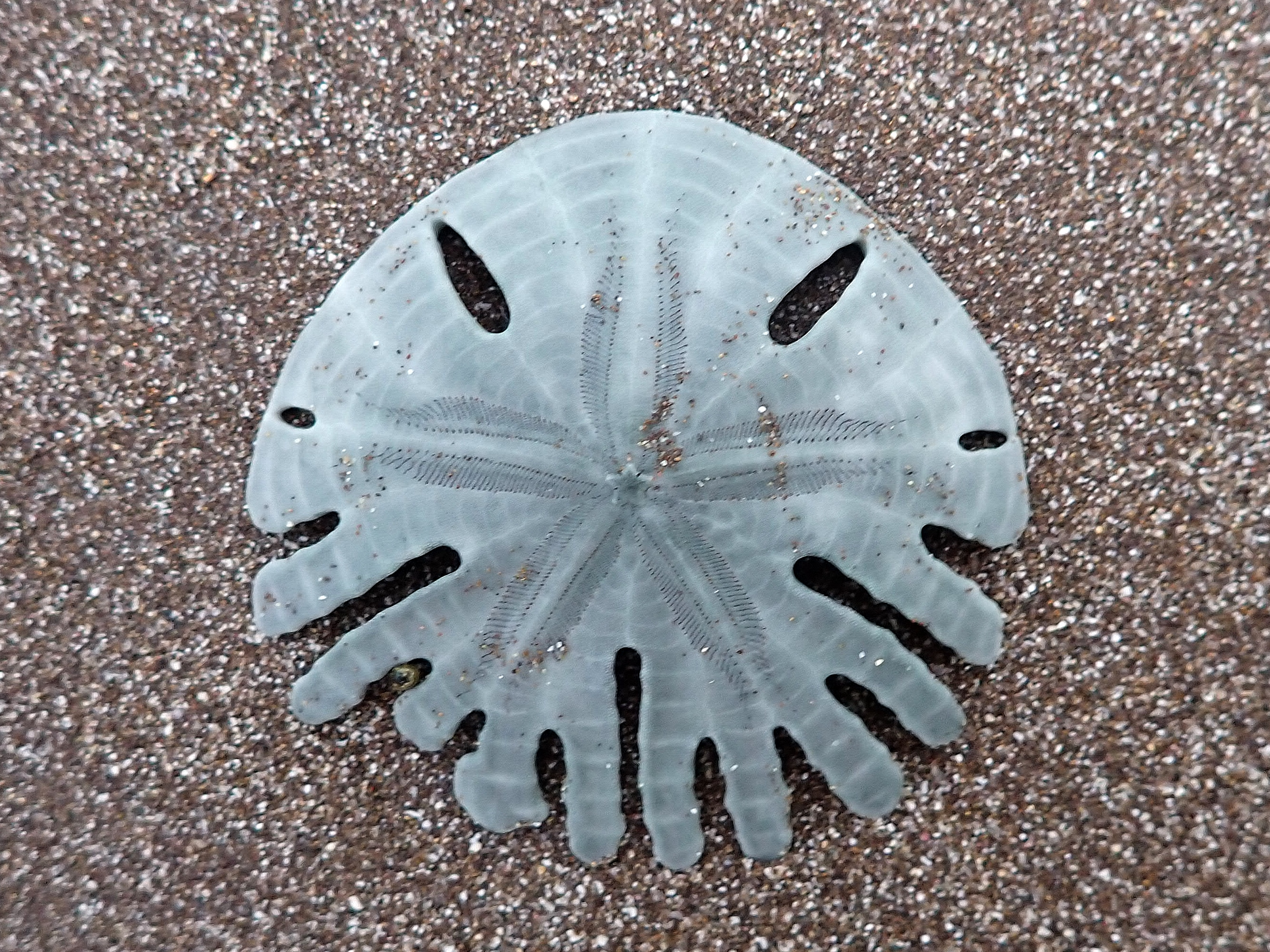
- Rotula deciesdigitatus, West Africa

Scientific classification
- Kingdom: Animalia
- Phylum: Echinodermata
- Class: Echinoidea
- Order: Clypeasteroida
- Family: Rotulidae
- Genus: Rotula; Schumacher, 1817
- Species: R. deciesdigitatus

Binomial name
- Rotula deciesdigitatus (Leske, 1778)

Synonyms
- Botula Neave, 1939; Echinotrochus Pomel, 1883

= Rotula deciesdigitatus =

Species of echinoderm

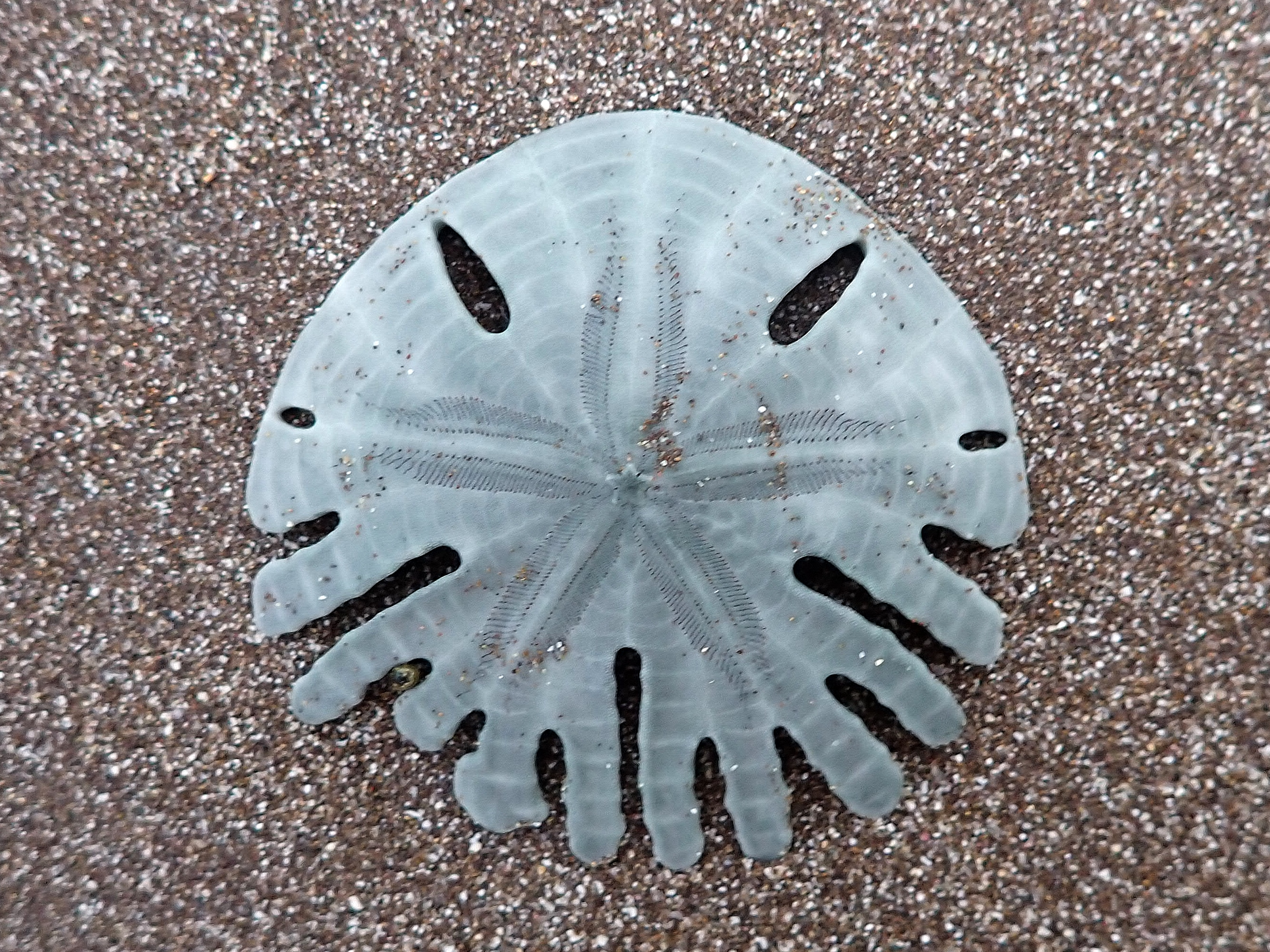
Rotula deciesdigitatus, São Tomé and Príncipe

Rotula deciesdigitatus is a species of echinoderm in the monotypic genus Rotula, belonging to the family Rotulidae.

The species is found in Europe and Western Africa.
