= Albula esuncula =

Conservation status
- Least Concern (IUCN 3.1)

Scientific classification
- Kingdom: Animalia
- Phylum: Chordata
- Class: Actinopterygii
- Order: Albuliformes
- Family: Albulidae
- Genus: Albula
- Species: A. esuncula

Binomial name
- Albula esuncula (Garman, 1899)

Synonyms
- Atopichthys esunculus Garman, 1899; Albula esunculus (Garman, 1899)

Species of fish

Albula esuncula, the eastern Pacific bonefish, is a species of marine fish found in the eastern tropical Pacific Ocean, from the coast of Mazatlán, Mexico south to southern Peru, and west to the Galápagos Islands.

== Taxonomy ==
Bonefish were once believed to be a single species (A. vulpes) with a global distribution, but nine different species have since been identified. There are three identified species in the Atlantic and six in the Pacific. It was previously identified as A. neoguinaica (a synonym for A. argentea), which is now known to be restricted to the western Pacific. Previously, it was thought to range as far north as southern California, but phylogenetic evidence found that this taxon was in fact a new species, Albula gilberti.
