= Albula virgata =

Conservation status
- Data Deficient (IUCN 3.1)

Scientific classification
- Kingdom: Animalia
- Phylum: Chordata
- Class: Actinopterygii
- Order: Albuliformes
- Family: Albulidae
- Genus: Albula
- Species: A. virgata

Binomial name
- Albula virgata D.S. Jordan & E.K. Jordan, 1922

Species of fish

Albula virgata is a species of bonefish found in the Hawaiian Islands. It is known commonly as the longjaw bonefish or 'ō'io in Hawaiian. They grow up to 32 cm (13 in).

The name 'ō'io may refer to other species of bonefish in Hawaii, such as the roundjaw/shortjaw bonefish Albula glossodonta, and the sharpjaw bonefish Albula argentea.

== Taxonomy and nomenclature ==
Bonefish were once believed to be a single species with a global distribution, however 11 different species have since been identified.

Albula virgata was first described by the American ichthyologist David Starr Jordan and his son Edward Knight Jordan in 1922. It has a somewhat convoluted nomenclatural history. It was originally named Esox argenteus, but that name was already in use for the giant kokopu, and it was later renamed Albula forsteri. However, Forster's taxon is in a genus different than the giant kokopu, and thus Forster's name still stands.

For decades, Albula virgata was considered a synonym of either Albula vulpes or Albula argentea. It was eventually recognized as a species distinct from Albula argentea.

== Description ==
Albula virgata is similar to A. argentea and A. oligolepis in length of the upper jaw, but differs in having fewer vertebrae and lateral-line scales, as well as having the tip of pelvic fin reaching beyond anterior edge of anus. Like other bonefish, they have an elongated, silvery white body, with large scales.

== Distribution and habitat ==
Albula virgata is known only from the Hawaiian Islands. They are thought to be restricted to shallow sand flats, which are a rare and fragmented habitat type in the Hawaiian Islands.
