= Albula nemoptera =

Conservation status
- Data Deficient (IUCN 3.1)

Scientific classification
- Kingdom: Animalia
- Phylum: Chordata
- Class: Actinopterygii
- Order: Albuliformes
- Family: Albulidae
- Genus: Albula
- Species: A. nemoptera

Binomial name
- Albula nemoptera (Fowler, 1911)

Synonyms
- Dixonina nemoptera Fowler, 1911

Species of fish

Albula nemoptera, also known as the Caribbean bonefish, threadfin bonefish, or shafted bonefish, is a species of marine fish found in the western Caribbean Sea, from Honduras west to Panama.

== Taxonomy ==
This is one of two species of bonefish that was largely accepted by taxonomic authorities prior to the revision of the genus, the other being A. vulpes. Previously, bonefish populations on the eastern Pacific coast from Mexico east to Panama were also included in A. nemoptera, but have since been split into a distinct species, A. pacifica.
