= Sharpjaw bonefish =

Sharpjaw bonefish is a common name for several fishes and may refer to:

- Albula argentea
- Albula glossodonta
