= Indo-Pacific bonefish =

Indo-Pacific bonefish is a common name for several fishes and may refer to:

- Albula glossodonta
- Albula vulpes
