= Albula koreana =

Conservation status
- Data Deficient (IUCN 3.1)

Scientific classification
- Kingdom: Animalia
- Phylum: Chordata
- Class: Actinopterygii
- Order: Albuliformes
- Family: Albulidae
- Genus: Albula
- Species: A. koreana

Binomial name
- Albula koreana Kwun & Kim, 2011

Species of fish

Albula koreana, the Korean bonefish, is a species of marine fish found in the western Pacific Ocean, off the coast of eastern Asia.

== Taxonomy ==
Bonefish were once believed to be a single species with a global distribution; however, nine different species have since been identified. There are three identified species in the Atlantic and six in the Pacific. A. koreana was described as a new species in 2011 based on genetic evidence from populations previously assigned to A. vulpes.

== Distribution ==
This species has been identified off the southern coast of South Korea and the northern coast of Taiwan.
