= Calcancora =

Calcancora Temporal range: Anisian–Tortonian

Scientific classification
- Domain: Eukaryota
- Kingdom: Animalia
- Phylum: Echinodermata
- Class: Holothuroidea
- Order: Apodida
- Family: †Calcancoridae; Frizzell & Exline, 1955
- Genus: †Calcancora; Frizzell & Exline, 1955

Type species
- †Calcancora mississippiensis

Species
- †C. mississippiensis; †C. pomerania; †C. venusta

Genus of echinoderms

Calcancora is an extinct genus of sea cucumber which existed in Poland during the Triassic period, Germany during the upper Jurassic period, France, Brazil, and the United States during the Paleogene period, and Austria during the Tortonian period. The type species is Calcancora mississippiensis.
