= Albula gilberti =

Scientific classification
- Kingdom: Animalia
- Phylum: Chordata
- Class: Actinopterygii
- Division: Teleostei
- Order: Albuliformes
- Family: Albulidae
- Genus: Albula
- Species: A. gilberti

Binomial name
- Albula gilberti Pfeiler & van der Heiden, 2011

Species of fish

Albula gilberti, also known as the Cortez bonefish or macabi, is a species of bonefish in the eastern Pacific from the Southern California Bight to the Sea of Cortez and Sinaloa.

== Taxonomy ==
In general, the morphology of the genus Albula is highly conserved, making a description of species based on morphological features very difficult. The closest relative of this species is considered to be its sister species Albula esuncula. It is estimated that their lineages split about 5.0-8.8 million years ago.

== Distribution ==
This species is found in the Eastern Pacific. It ranges from the Southern California Bight to the bottom of the Baja California Peninsula and Sinaloa. It also occurs within the Sea of Cortez. At the bottom-most stretch of occurrence, A. gilberti is sympatric with A. esuncula.

== Description ==
The Cortez bonefish has a maximum known standard length of 25.7 cm. It has a fusiform body with an inferior mouth and a forked tail. The fish is covered in large silver scales, with a gradient from the gray dorsal side to the white ventral side. Vertical stripes are sometimes visible emerging from the dorsal side. Occasionally, portions of the pectoral, pelvic, and fins are observed to be orange.

There is no concrete evidence that fully supports the usage of any morphological characteristic to distinguish the Cortez bonefish from Albula esuncla, the eastern Pacific bonefish. Rather, the two species are only distinguished by genetic analysis.

As a member of the superorder Elopomorpha, Cortez bonefish have leptocephalus larva. After the larva metamorphose into a fusiform shape, they remain clear but appear to have black vertical stripes. Eventually, juvenile fish simply appear as smaller versions of the adults.

== Behavior ==
No research has been conducted on this species specifically. Other bonefish species of near-identical morphology are known to eat a wide variety of benthic prey and inhabit shallow sand flats and sea grass beds.

== Human interaction ==
As the name implies, Cortez bonefish are bony and are not consumed in great numbers.

A population of Cortez bonefish in San Diego Bay constitutes a minor recreational fishery. The current IGFA world record Cortez bonefish was caught in San Diego Bay by William Brent Evans and weighed 0.77 kg.
