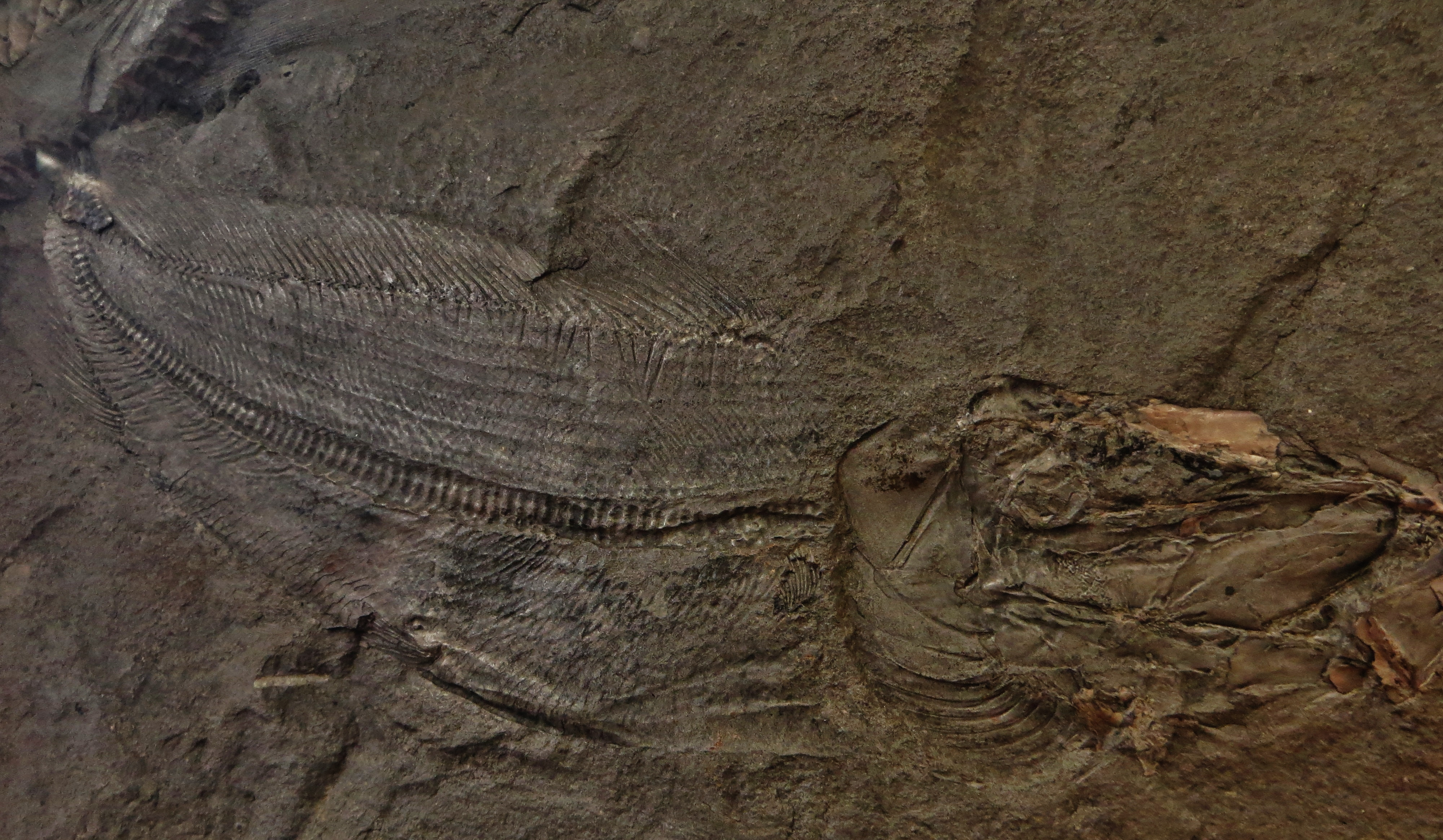
- Specimen of I. grandis, Museum Koenig Bonn

Scientific classification
- Kingdom: Animalia
- Phylum: Chordata
- Class: Actinopterygii
- Division: Teleostei
- Order: Albuliformes
- Family: Albulidae
- Subfamily: Pterothrissinae
- Genus: †Istieus; Agassiz, 1844

Species
- See text

= Istieus =

Istieus Temporal range: Santonian-Campanian

Extinct genus of fishes

Istieus is an extinct genus of prehistoric marine bonefish which lived during the Late Cretaceous from the Santonian to the Campanian.

The following species are known:

- I. grandis Agassiz, 1844 (type species) - Campanian of Germany (Ahlen Formation)
- I. lebanonensis Davis, 1887 - Santonian of Lebanon (Sahel Alma)
- I. macrocephalus Agassiz, 1844 - Campanian of Germany (Ahlen Formation)

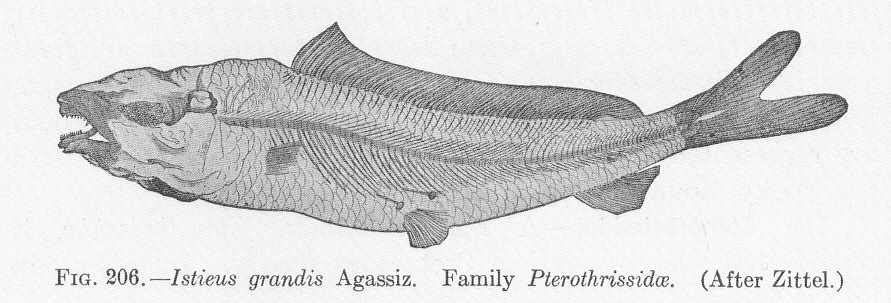
Illustration of I. grandis specimen

It is a member of the subfamily Pterothrissinae, making it related to the modern long-fin bonefish and Japanese gissu.

== See also ==
- Prehistoric fish
- List of prehistoric bony fish
