= Exline (name) =

Exline is a surname based on the German name Exlein. It is an occupational name derived from the German "Ochslein", which means a person who tended or worked with oxen. Notable people with the name include:

- Brittney Exline (born 1992), American software engineer
- Harriet Exline Frizzell (1909–1968), American arachnologist
