= Acanthotheelia =

Scientific classification
- Kingdom: Animalia
- Phylum: Echinodermata
- Class: Holothuroidea
- Order: Apodida
- Family: Myriotrochidae
- Genus: †Acanthotheelia; Frizzell & Exline, 1955

Type species
- Acanthotheelia spinosa Frizzell & Exline, 1955

Extinct genus of echinoderms

Acanthotheelia is an extinct genus of sea cucumbers which existed in Poland during the Triassic period. It contains the species Acanthotheelia spinosa, Acanthotheelia spiniperjorata, and Acanthotheelia anisica.
