= Roundjaw bonefish =

Roundjaw bonefish is a common name for several fishes and may refer to:

- Albula glossodonta
- Albula vulpes
