= Hajulia =

Hajulia Temporal range: Upper Cenomanian

Scientific classification
- Kingdom: Animalia
- Phylum: Chordata
- Class: Actinopterygii
- Division: Teleostei
- Order: Albuliformes
- Family: Albulidae
- Subfamily: Pterothrissinae
- Genus: †Hajulia; Woodward, 1942
- Species: †H. multidens

Binomial name
- †Hajulia multidens Woodward, 1942

Extinct genus of fishes

Hajulia is an extinct genus of bonefish that lived during the Late Cretaceous. It contains a single species, H. multidens from the Cenomanian-aged Sannine Formation of Lebanon.

It was a member of the Pterothrissinae, the same subfamily that contains the modern gissus in Nemoossis and Pterothrissus.

== See also ==
- Prehistoric fish
- List of prehistoric bony fish
