= Bullichthys =

Bullichthys Temporal range: Albian ~112 Ma

Scientific classification
- Domain: Eukaryota
- Kingdom: Animalia
- Phylum: Chordata
- Class: Actinopterygii
- Order: Albuliformes
- Genus: †Bullichthys; Mayrinck, Brito & Otero, 2010
- Species: †B. santanensis

Binomial name
- †Bullichthys santanensis Mayrinck, Brito & Otero, 2010

Extinct genus of fishes

Bullichthys is an extinct genus of marine albuliform fish which existed in the Romualdo Formation, Brazil during the Early Cretaceous (Albian) period. The type species is B. santanensis. The genus name references its inflated otic bulla.

It is thought to be one of the most basal members of the order Albuliformes, whose only extant relatives are the bonefish and gissus. At least one study has instead found it to possibly represent a stem-elopiform or even a stem-elopomorph, although most studies continue to recover it as an albuliform.
