= Crazy Charlie =

Fly fishing pattern

- Artificial fly
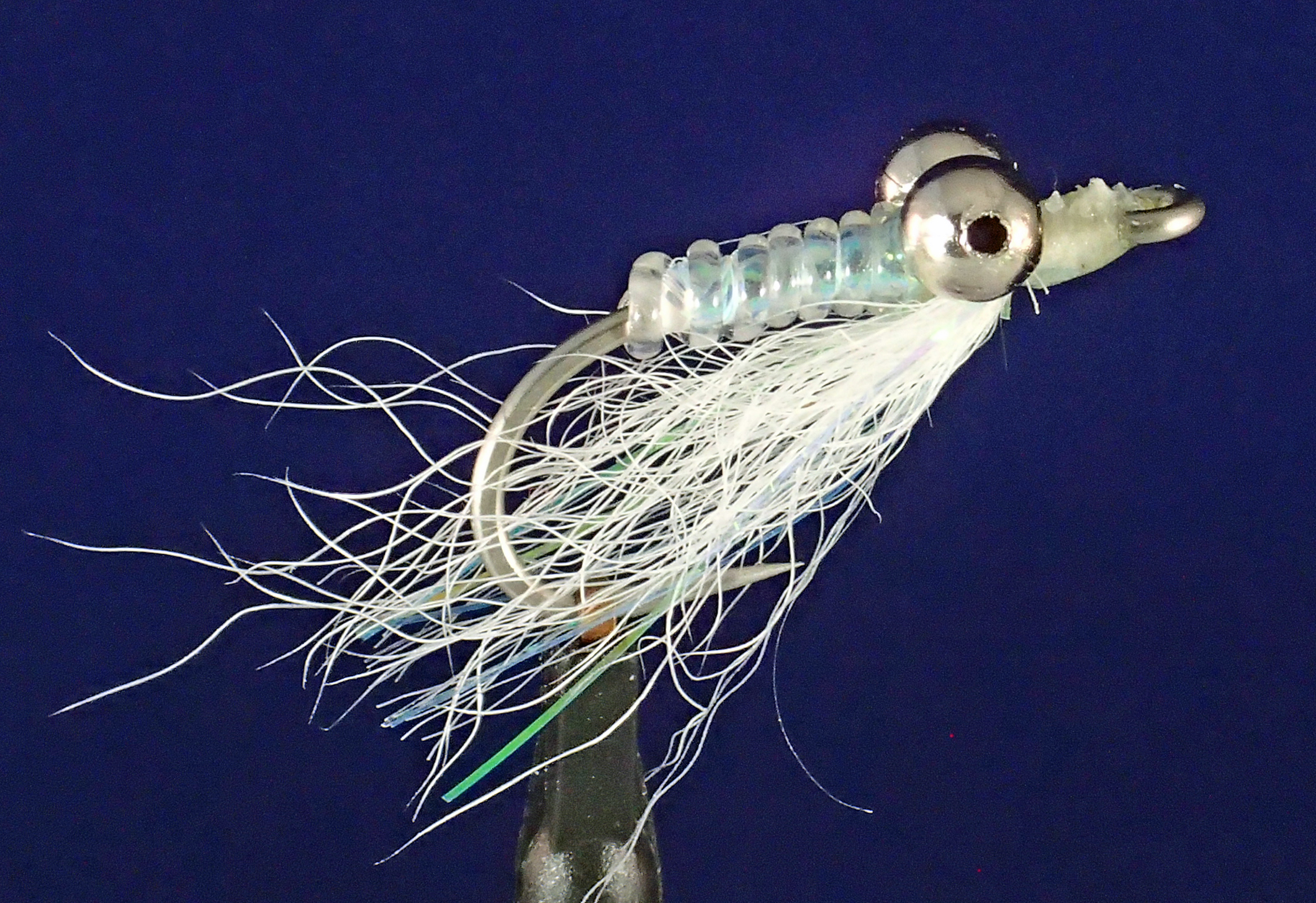
- Traditional Crazy Charlie in white
- Type: Saltwater fly
- Imitates: Glass minnows, shrimp, crabs

History
- Creator: Charlie Smith/Bob Nauheim
- Created: 1977
- Other names: Nasty Charlie
- Variations: Blind Charlie

Materials
- Typical sizes: 8-2
- Typical hooks: TMC 811S stainless saltwater
- Thread: 6/0 or equivalent
- Tail: optional
- Body: pearlescent tinsel underbody, clear vinyl/mono overbody
- Wing: calf hair
- Topping: pearlescent flash
- Bead: bead chain eyes

Uses
- Primary use: Saltwater bonefish, permit

Reference(s)
- Pattern references: Whitelaw, Ian (2015). The History of Fly-Fishing in Fifty Flies. New York: Abrams. pp. 162–163. ISBN 9781617691461.

The Crazy Charlie is a bonefish fly for saltwater fly fishing developed on Andros Island in 1977 in the Bahamas by local bonefish guide Charlie Smith and popularized by San Francisco angler Bob Nauheim. They fly was developed to imitate glass minnows (young of anchovies, genus Anchoa), a common forage for bonefish on the nearshore flats of south Florida and Caribbean islands. The Crazy Charlie has become a staple fly for bonefish and permit anglers around the globe.

== Origin ==
Charlie Smith was a renowned Bahamian bonefish guide operating Charlie's Haven resort on Behring Point, Andros Island in the early 1970s. The resort catered to celebrity and well heeled anglers seeking Bonefish on the flats of Andros, Island. Although stories vary as to the actual creation of the Crazy Charlie, credit is given to Bob Nauheim, founder of Fishing International, a global sport fishing travel agency based in Santa Rosa, California. Nauheim had fished with Charlie Smith on a number of occasions when during a 1977 trip, he crafted the first Crazy Charlie bonefish flies to imitate small glass minnows by adding bead chain eyes. The original patterns proved successful on Andros Island bonefish so Nauheim and Charlie Smith christened the original flies "Nasty Charlie's". When Charlie Smith saw Nauheim's flies for the first time, he is said to have remarked: "dat fly is nasty mon", thus the original name. Other accounts credit Charlie Smith with the original creation which was then shared with Nauheim.

Nauheim took the pattern home to Santa Rosa and showed them to Leigh Perkins, the owner of Orvis outfitters. Perkins liked the pattern and added it to the Orvis catalog and began popularizing it for bonefish and permit. Perkins did not like the name "Nasty Charlie" so the name was changed to Crazy Charlie with Charlie Smith's permission. The pattern rapidly became one of the most popular flies for bonefish, permit and other saltwater flats species as well.

== Materials ==
The classic Crazy Charlie is tied on a standard, short shank stainless steel saltwater fly hook in sizes eight through two. The TMC 811S saltwater hook is typical. The Crazy Charlie was the first bonefish fly to incorporate bead chain eyes for weight and allow the fly to ride hook point up. Lead or tungsten dumb bell eyes can be used for greater weight. The body consists of pearlescent flash overlaid with clear vinyl or monofilament ribbing. A wing of white calf tail is tied in at the hook eye and topped with a few strands of flash.

== Variations ==
The original Crazy Charlie quickly evolved into a generalized fly style and fly tiers created many variations using different materials for the body, wing and flash components as well as different color combinations. The Crazy Charlie fly style is easily adapted to shrimp and crab imitations. The wing can be crafted from buck tail, fur, feathers or synthetics. The body can be crafted with dubbing, chenille and varieties of synthetics including epoxies for durability. Tails using furs, feathers, buck tail or synthetics can be added. A version known as the "Blind Charlie" is tied without the bead chain eyes.

== Gallery ==
Crazy Charlies Variations
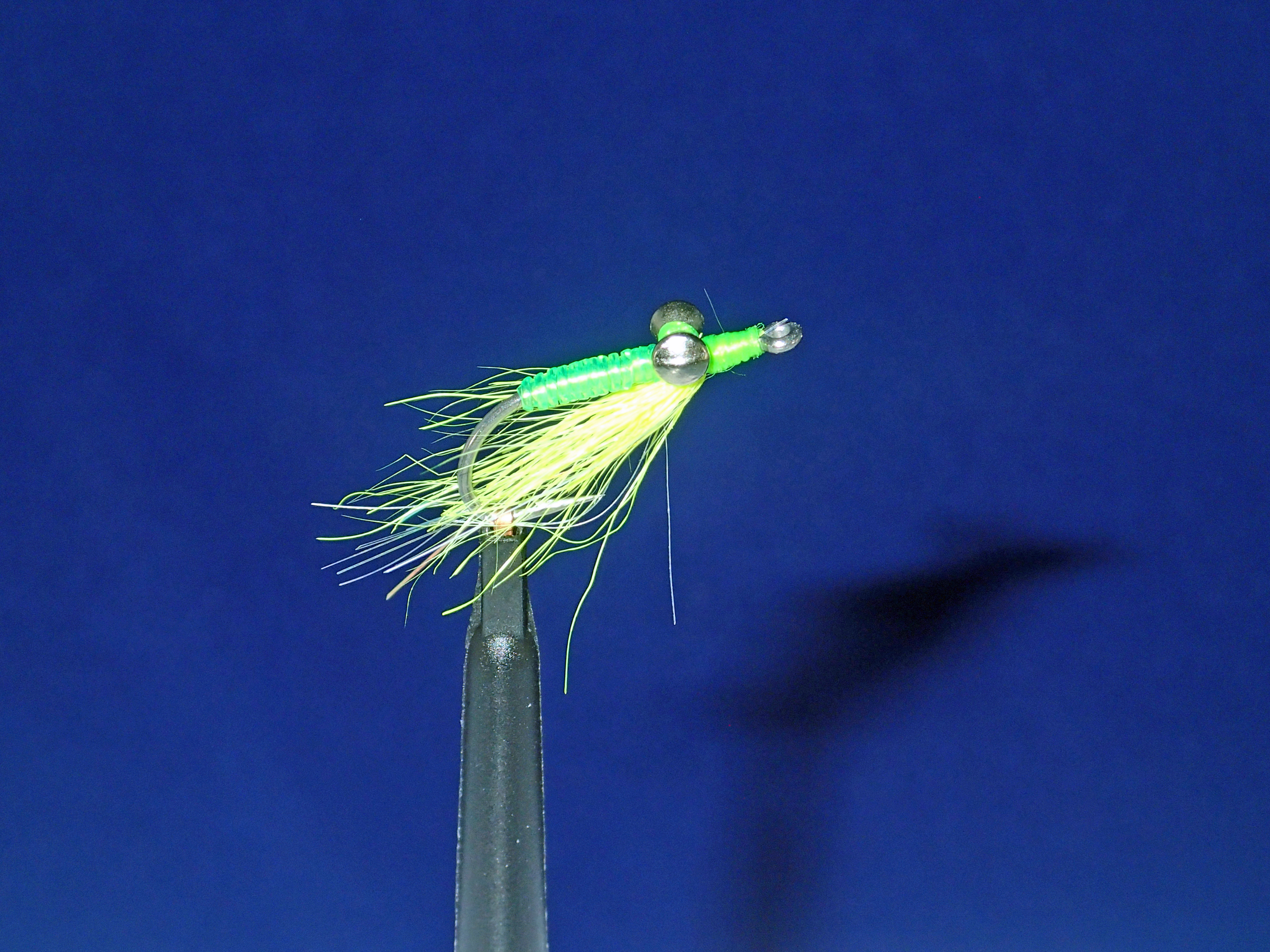
Chartreuse with buck tail wing

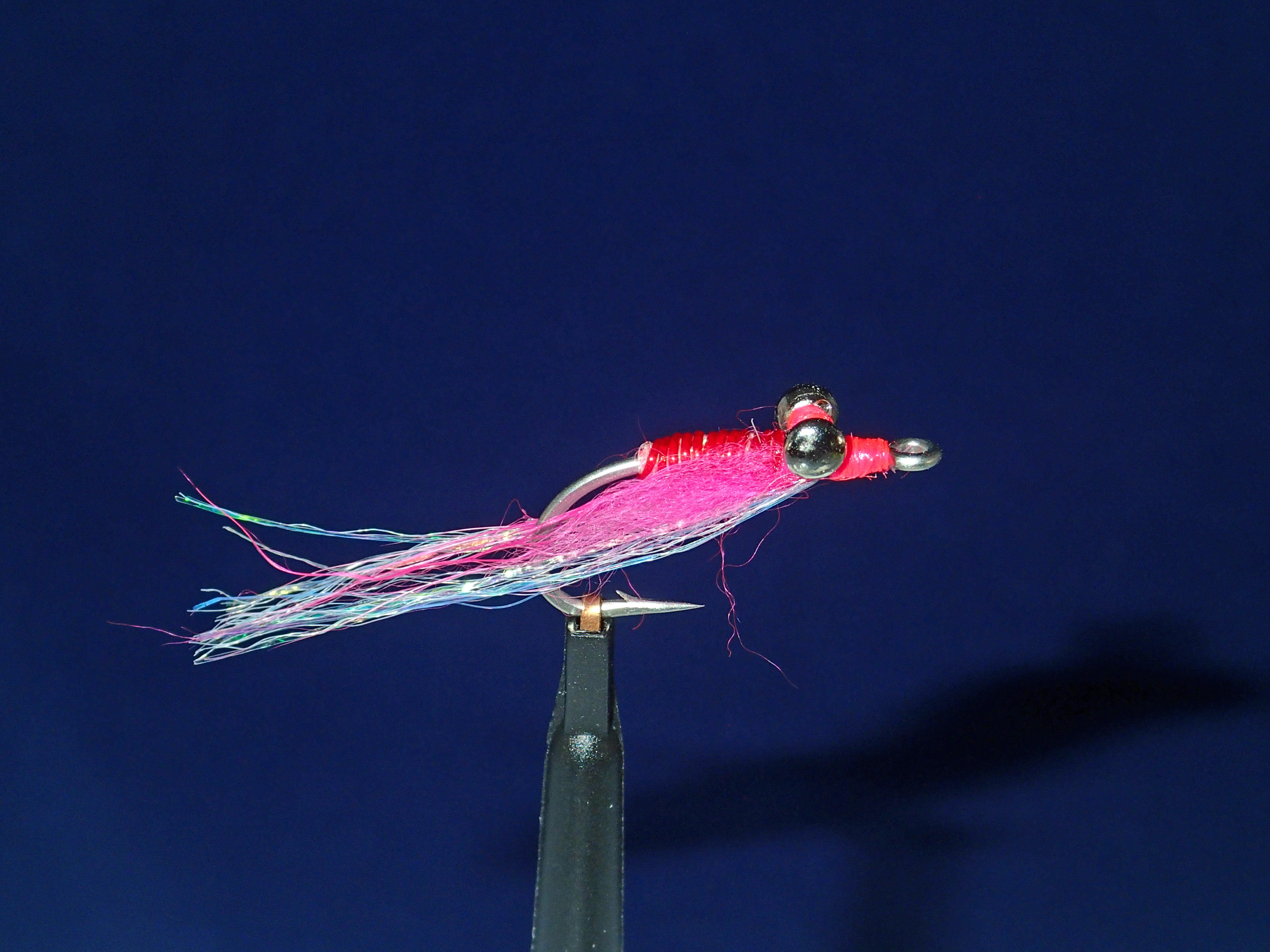
Pink and red with fur wing

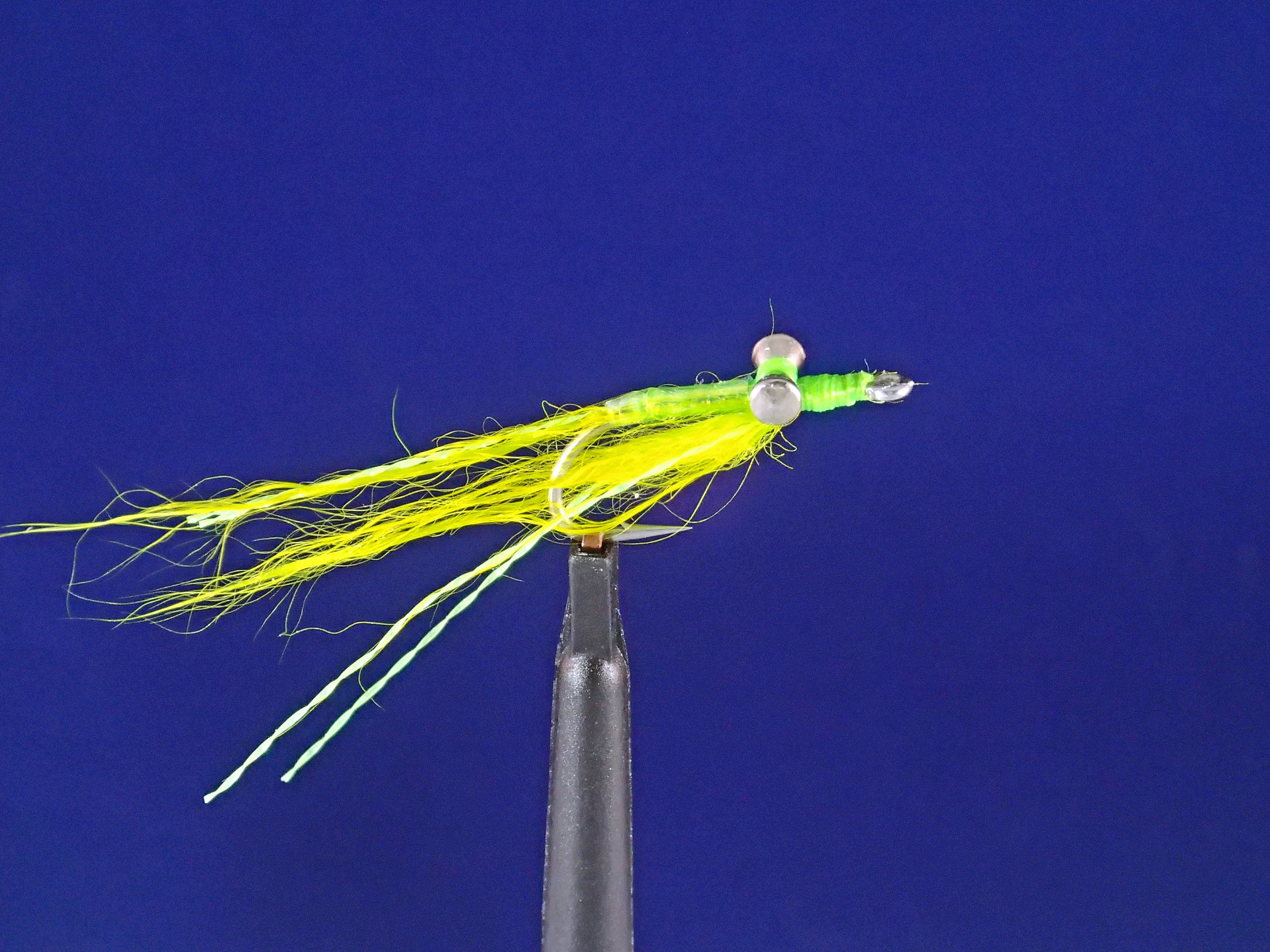
Chartreuse with fur wing and tail

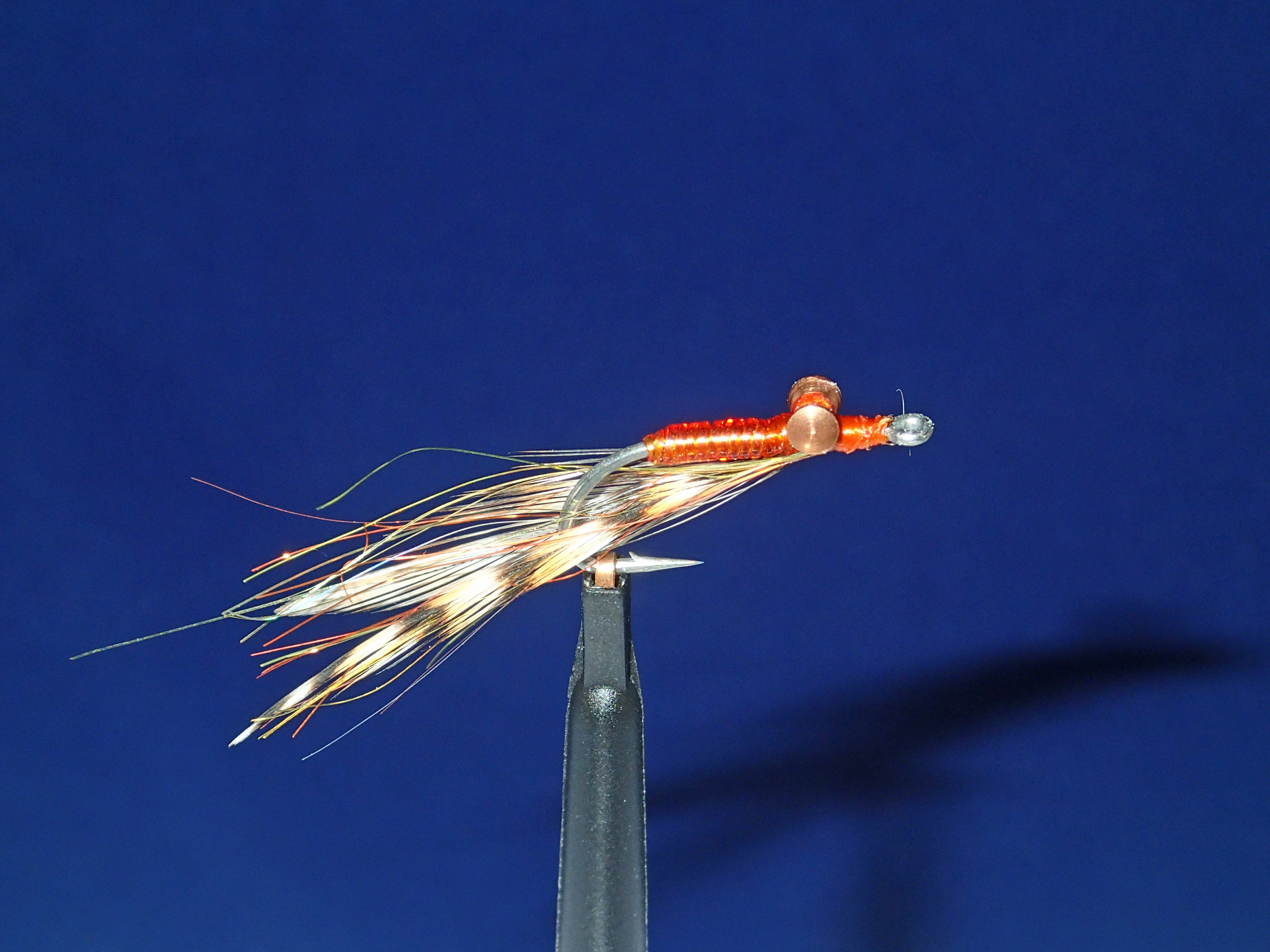
Brown and feather wing

== See also ==
- Bonefish fly patterns
