= Jefitchia =

Jefitchia Temporal range: Middle Eocene–Late Oligocene

Scientific classification
- Domain: Eukaryota
- Kingdom: Animalia
- Phylum: Chordata
- Class: Actinopterygii
- Order: Acanthuriformes
- Family: Sciaenidae
- Genus: †Jefitchia; Frizzell & Dante, 1965

Type species
- †Jefitchia copelandi Frizzell & Dante, 1965

Species
- See text

Extinct genus of ray-finned fishes

Jefitchia is an extinct genus of drum. Species lived from 48.6–33.9 mya (Middle Eocene – Late Oligocene). Jefitchia have been uncovered in Texas, Louisiana, and Portugal.

== Species ==
Jefitchia contains 3 species:

- †Jefitchia claybornensis Frizzell & Dante, 1965
- †Jefitchia copelandi (Koken, 1888)
- †Jefitchia spinosa Jonet, 1979
