= Casierius =

Casierius Temporal range: Early Albian

Scientific classification
- Kingdom: Animalia
- Phylum: Chordata
- Class: Actinopterygii
- Order: Albuliformes
- Family: †Phyllodontidae
- Genus: †Casierius; Estes, 1969
- Species: †C. heckeli

Binomial name
- †Casierius heckeli Estes, 1969

Extinct genus of fishes

Casierius is an extinct genus of marine ray-finned fish that lived during the Albian stage of the Early Cretaceous epoch. It was a relative of the modern bonefish in the extinct family Phyllodontidae, although some authorities consider it either a true albulid (making it even more closely related to bonefish) or a very early eel. It contains a single species, C. heckeli, known from the Glen Rose Formation near Hood County, Texas.

== See also ==
- Prehistoric fish
- List of prehistoric bony fish
