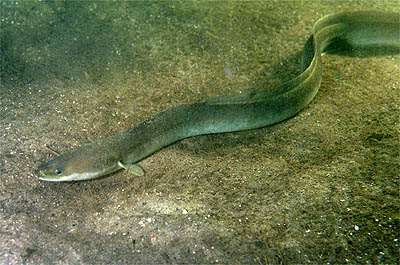
- Anguilla anguilla

Scientific classification
- Kingdom: Animalia
- Phylum: Chordata
- Class: Actinopterygii
- Division: Teleostei
- Superorder: Elopomorpha; P. H. Greenwood, D. E. Rosen, S. H. Weitzman, and G. S. Meyers, 1966

Synonyms
- Taeniopaedia Greenwood et al. 1967 sensu Nelson 1973; Elopocephalai Patterson 1977 sensu Arratia 1999

= Elopomorpha =

Elopomorpha Temporal range: Early Jurassic to present, 201.3–0 Ma

Superorder of fishes

The superorder Elopomorpha contains a variety of types of fishes that range from typical silvery-colored species, such as the tarpons and ladyfishes of the Elopiformes and the bonefishes of the Albuliformes, to the long and slender, smooth-bodied eels of the Anguilliformes. The one characteristic uniting this group of fishes is they all have leptocephalus larvae, which are unique to the Elopomorpha. No other fishes have this type of larvae.

== Taxonomy ==
The Elopomorpha are a group of teleost fishes and are separated into several orders.

Cladogram of living Elopomorpha

- Elopomorpha
  - Elopiformes
  - - Albuliformes
    - - Notacanthiformes
      - Anguilliformes

- Genus †Bullichthys Mayrincka, Britob & Otero 2010
- Genus †Eichstaettia Arratia 1987
- Genus †Eoenchelys Lu 1994
- Genus †Elopomorphorum Weiler ex Martin & Weiler 1954 [Otolith]
- Order Elopiformes Gosline 1960
  - Family †Anaethaliidae Gaudant 1968
  - Suborder Elopoidei
    - Family Protelopidae de Saint Seine 1949
    - Family Elopidae Bonaparte 1832/Valenciennes 1847 (tenpounders, ladyfishes)
    - Family Megalopidae Jordan 1882 (Tarpons)
- Order Albuliformes Greenwood et al. 1966 sensu Forey et al. 1996
  - Family †Phyllodontidae Sauvage 1875 corrig. Jordan 1923
  - Family Albulidae Bleeker 1849 (Japanese gissu and bonefishes)
- Order Notacanthiformes Goodrich 1909
  - Halosauridae Günther 1868
  - Notacanthidae Rafinesque 1810 (Deep sea spiny eels)
- Order Anguilliformes
  - Family †Derrhiidae Jordan 1925b
  - Family †Libanechelyidae Taverne 2004
  - Family †Anguillavidae Hay 1903
  - Family †Urenchelyidae Jordan 1905
  - Suborder Protanguilloidei
    - Family Protanguillidae Johnson, Ida & Miya 2011 (primitive cave eels)
  - Suborder Synaphobranchoidei
    - Family Synaphobranchidae Johnson 1862 (cutthroat eels)
  - Suborder Muraenoidei Risso 1826
    - Family †Georgidentidae Sychevskaya & Prokofiev 2003
    - Family Pythonichthyidae Böhlke 1966 (mud eels)
    - Family Myrocongridae Gill 1890
    - Family Muraenidae Rafinesque 1815 (moray eels)
  - Suborder Chlopsoidei
    - Family Chlopsidae Rafinesque 1815
  - Suborder Congroidei Kaup 1856
    - Family †Parachelidae Casier 1967
    - Family Ophichthidae Günther 1870 (snake eels & worm eels)
    - Family Derichthyidae Gill 1884 (longneck eels)
    - Family Muraenesocidae Kaup 1859 (pike congers)
    - Family Nettastomatidae Kaup 1859 (duckbill eels)
    - Family Congridae Kaup 1856 (conger eels)
  - Suborder Moringuoidei
    - Family Moringuidae Gill 1885
  - Suborder Anguilloidei Regan 1909
    - Family †Anguilloididae Blot 1978
    - Family †Milananguillidae Blot 1978
    - Family †Mylomyridae Berg 1940
    - Family †Nardoechelyidae Taverne & Capasso 2014
    - Family †Paranguillidae Blot 1980
    - Family †Patavichthyidae Blot 1981
    - Family †Proteomyridae Blot 1980
    - Family Nemichthyidae Günther 1870 (snipe eels)
    - Family Serrivomeridae Roule 1929 (sawtooth eels)
    - Family Anguillidae Rafinesque 1810 (freshwater eels)
  - Suborder Saccopharyngoidei Robins 1989
    - Family Cyematidae Regan 1912 (bobtail snipe eels)
    - Family Saccopharyngidae Bleeker 1859
    - Family Eurypharyngidae Gill 1883 (pelican eels, umbrellamouth gulpers)
    - Family Monognathidae Bertin 1936 (onejaw gulpers)
