= Bonefish fly patterns =

- Artificial fly
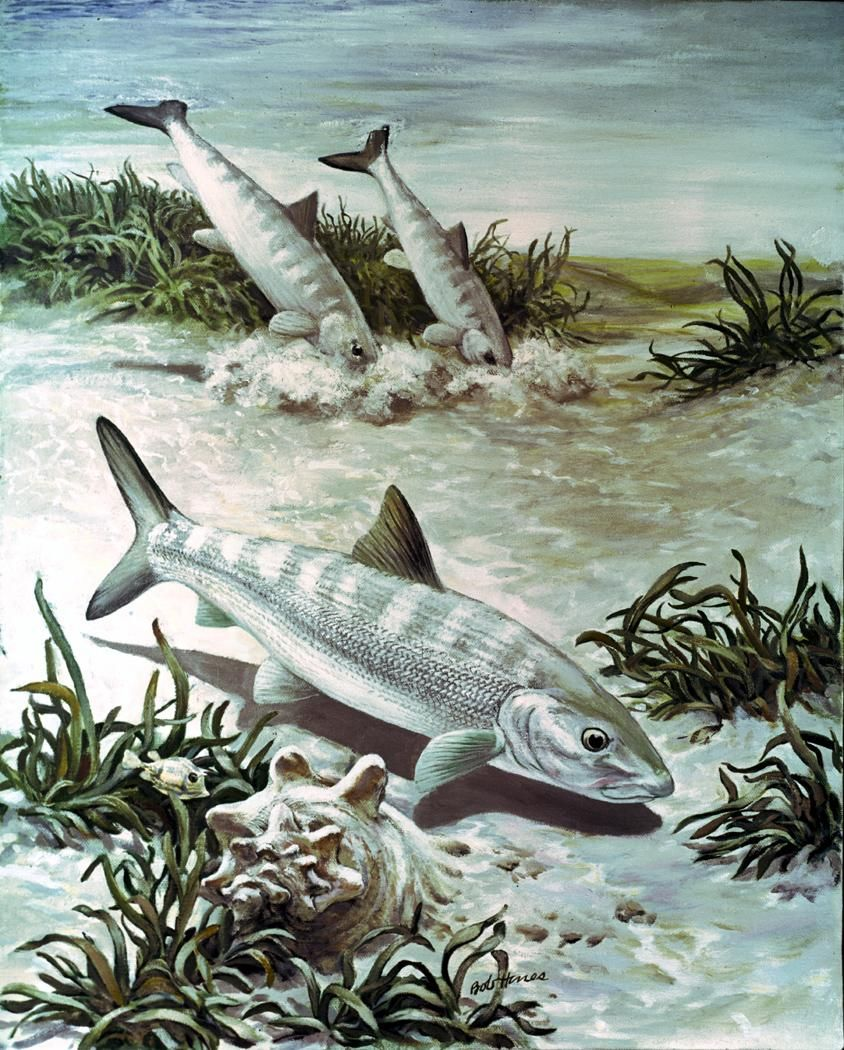
- Feeding Bonefish
- Type: Saltwater fly
- Imitates: Crabs, Shrimp, Baitfish

Materials
- Typical sizes: 4-8 Standard Saltwater
- Typical hooks: TMC 811

Uses
- Primary use: Bonefish

Bonefish fly patterns are a collection of artificial flies routinely used by fly anglers targeting various species of Bonefish. Bonefish frequent tidal sand and mudflats in tropical and sub-tropical latitudes to feed on benthic worms, fry, crustaceans, and mollusks. Bonefish have small mouths and most Bonefish flies are tied on size 4 to 8 saltwater fly hooks.

== Early Bonefish patterns ==
Early records show bonefish being targeted with flies as early as 1926 and by the 1940s fly fishing for bonefish with crude shrimp and baitfish patterns was not uncommon.

As described in Salt Water Flies (1972), Kenneth E. Bay
- Horror
- Sands Bonefish fly
- Solomon Bonefish
- Pink Shrimp

As described in Fly Fishing in Saltwater (1974), Lefty Kreh

- The Horror
- Blue Tail Fly
- Frankie Belle Bonefish Fly
Early Bonefish Flies
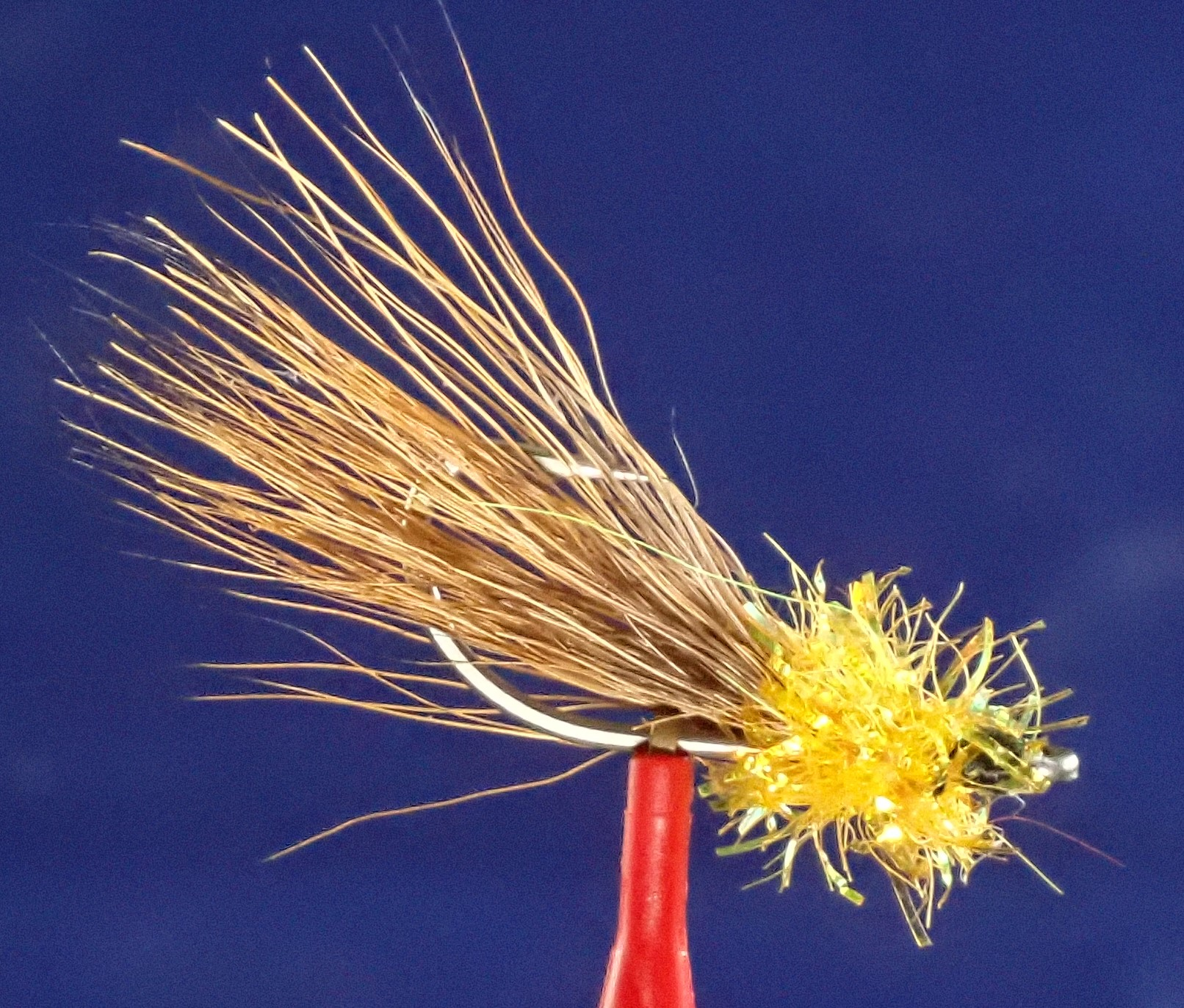
The Horror Bonefish fly

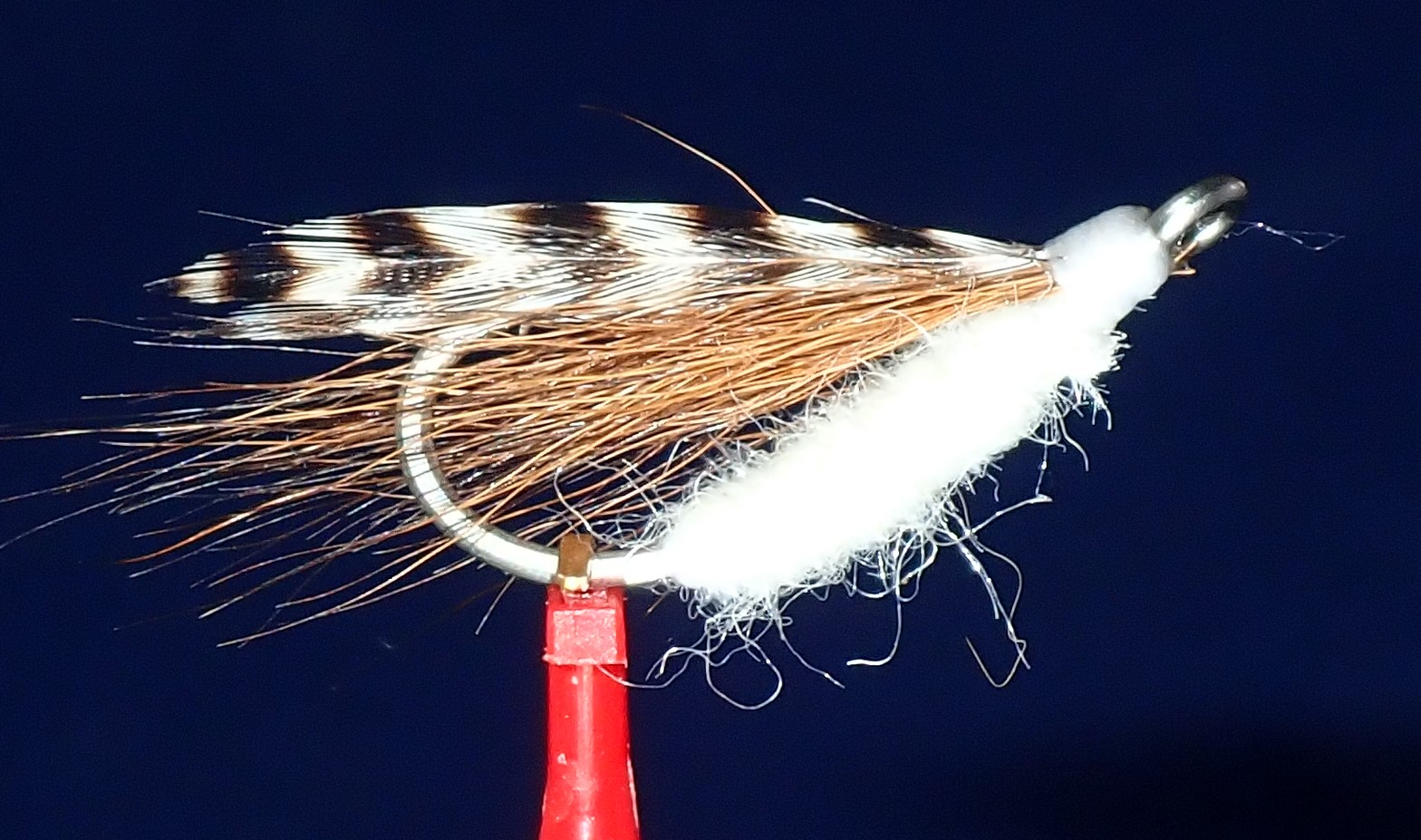
Frankie Belle Bonefish fly

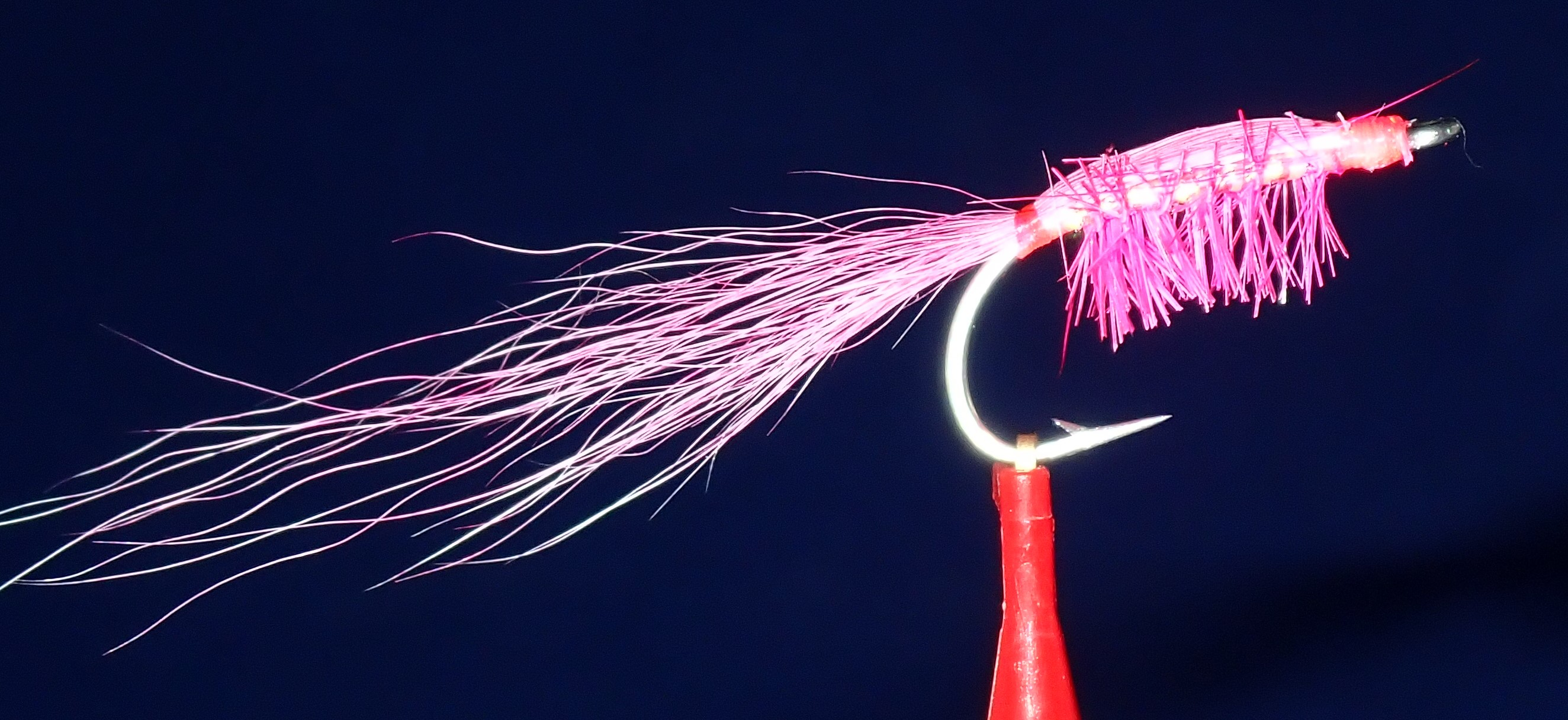
Pink Shrimp

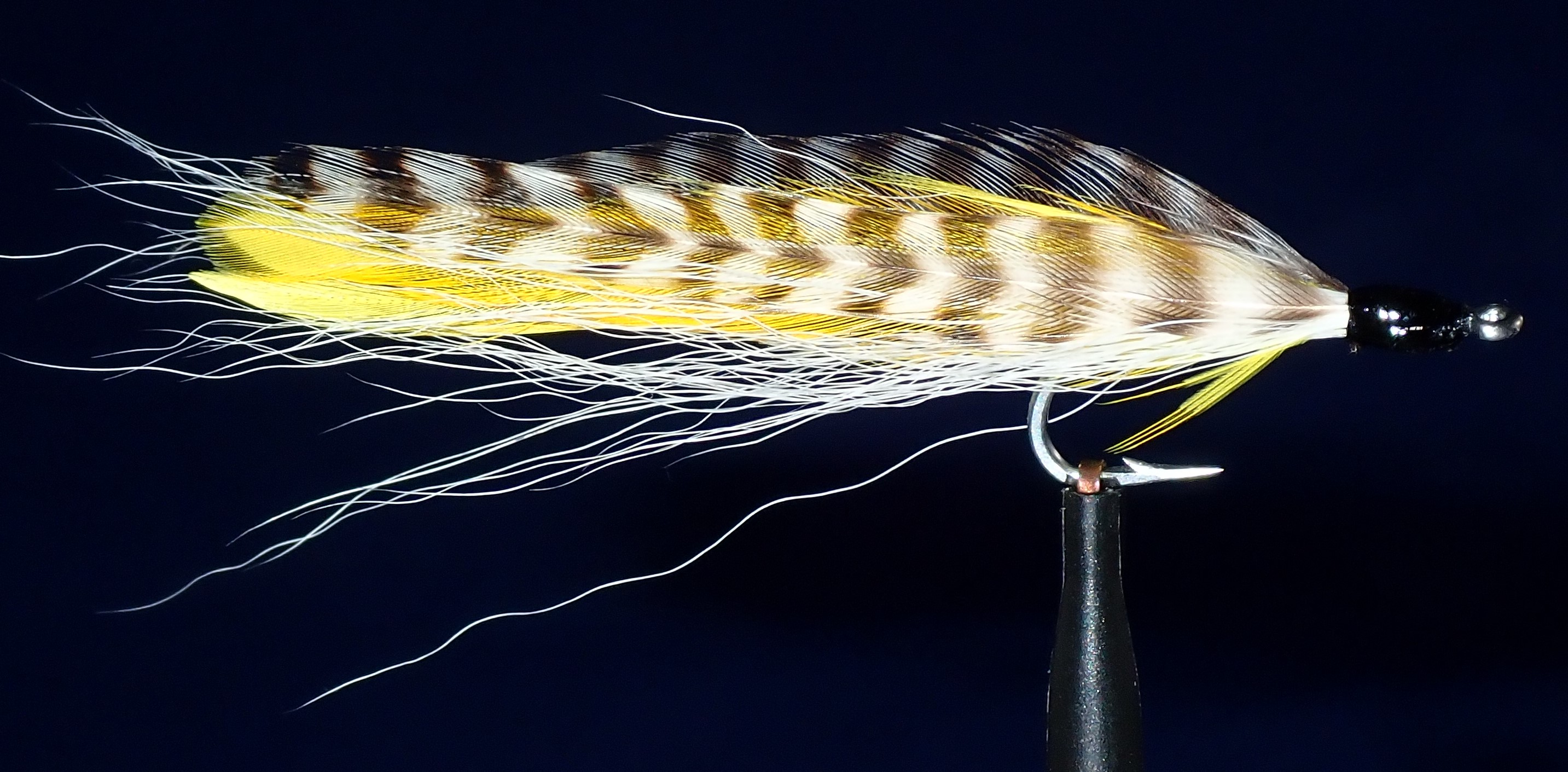
Sands Bonefish fly

== Crab patterns ==
As described in 101 Favorite Saltwater Flies-History, Tying Tips and Fishing Strategies (2015), David Klausmeyer
- McFly Crab
- Hochner's Defiant Crab
- Detonator Crab
- Cathy's Fleeing Crab
- Palometa Crab
- Bastard Permit Crab
- Merkin Crab
- Bonefish Bitters
- Turneffe Crab
- The Other Crab
- The Critter Crab
- Crab-Let
- Quivering Fringe

As Described in Inshore Flies (2000), Jim Schollmeyer and Ted Leeson

- Blue Crab
- Bone Bug
- Flats Burger
- Fleeing Crab
- Mess of a Crab
- One Shot Crab
- Slam-A-Rod

== Shrimp patterns ==
As described in 101 Favorite Saltwater Flies-History,
Tying Tips and Fishing Strategies (2015), David Klausmeyer
- Miheve's Flats Fly
- Mosquito Lagoon Special
- EZ Slider
- Bone Appetite
- Bonefish Slider
- Bob's Mantis Shrimp
- Rocket Man Mantis
- Gotcha
- UV2 Shrimp
- Salt Creature
- Reverend Laing
- Imitator Shrimp
- Ghost Belly Shrimp
- Bunny Shrimp
- Bird Fur Shrimp
- Spawning Ghost
- Foxy Shrimp

As Described in Inshore Flies (2000), Jim Schollmeyer and Ted Leeson

- Algal Bloom
- Arctic Shrimp
- B. C. Shrimp
- Cole's Peel and Eat Shrimp
- Don's Popping Shrimp
- Epoxy Slider
- Glass Bead Shrimp
- Hart Glass Shrimp
- Key Lime Fly
- Red Eye Bone

As described in Professionals' Favorite Flies-Volume 2-Streamers, Poppers, Crustaceans and Saltwater Patterns (1994), Lefty Kreh

- Snapping Shrimp
- Deer Hair Shrimp
- Lou's Bonefish Fly

== Baitfish patterns ==
As Described in Inshore Flies (2000), Jim Schollmeyer and Ted Leeson
- Epoxy Minnow
- Bullethead Glass Minnow
- Greg's Bottom Feeder
- Mullet Diver

As described in Professionals' Favorite Flies-Volume 2-Streamers, Poppers, Crustaceans and Saltwater Patterns (1994), Lefty Kreh

- Apricot Crazy Charlie
- Crazy Charlie
- Clouser Deep Minnow

== Hybrid patterns ==
Hybrid patterns are patterns often referred to as general attractor patterns or patterns specifically designed to imitate more than one type of prey, i.e. both shrimp and crabs.

As described in Professionals' Favorite Flies-Volume 2-Streamers, Poppers, Crustaceans and Saltwater Patterns (1994), Lefty Kreh
- Mini-Puff
- Mother of Epoxy
- Bonefish Special
- Bonefish Bunny
- Bend Back

As Described in Inshore Flies (2000), Jim Schollmeyer and Ted Leeson

- Epoxy Charlie
- FuzBone
- Glass Spoon Fly
- Greg's Flats Fly
- Lord Pinky
- Mr. Pinky
- Weighted Bend Back
