= Albula oligolepis =

Conservation status
- Data Deficient (IUCN 3.1)

Scientific classification
- Kingdom: Animalia
- Phylum: Chordata
- Class: Actinopterygii
- Order: Albuliformes
- Family: Albulidae
- Genus: Albula
- Species: A. oligolepis

Binomial name
- Albula oligolepis Hidaka, Iwatsuki & Randall, 2008

Species of fish

Albula oligolepis is a species of marine fish found in the Indo-West Pacific. It is often called the smallscale bonefish. They grow up to 32 cm (13 in).

== Taxonomy ==
Bonefish were once believed to be a single species with a global distribution, but nine different species have since been identified. There are three identified species in the Atlantic and six in the Pacific.

Albula oligolepis was formerly identified as A. argentea (called A. forsteri or A. neoguinacea in some sources). However, Hidaka et al. (2008) recognized the Indian and Australian populations are distinct from Albula argentea, naming them A. oligolepis.

== Description ==
Albula oligolepis is similar to A. argentea and A. virgata in length of the upper jaw, but differs in having fewer vertebrae and pored lateral-line scales, as well as the tip of the pelvic fin not reaching beyond anterior edge of anus.

== Distribution ==
Albula oligolepis is widespread in the Indian Ocean and the coast of Australia.
