= Diaphyodus =

Diaphyodus Temporal range: Late Paleocene to Late Eocene Possible Early Oligocene record

Scientific classification
- Kingdom: Animalia
- Phylum: Chordata
- Class: Actinopterygii
- Division: Teleostei
- Order: Acanthuriformes
- Family: Sciaenidae
- Genus: †Diaphyodus von Schafhäutl, 1863

Type species
- †Diaphyodus trigonella von Schafhäutl, 1863

Species
- †D. ovalis von Schafhäutl, 1863; †D. sauvagei (Leriche, 1900); †D. trigonella von Schafhäutl, 1863; †D. wilsoni Westgate, 1989

Extinct genus of ray-finned fishes

Diaphyodus is an extinct genus of prehistoric marine ray-finned fish, generally considered a drumfish, from the Late Paleocene and Eocene, and potentially to the mid-Oligocene of Europe and North America.

It is known by its isolated tooth plates, which are common in Paleogene formations in western Europe, with some remains also known from the southern United States. Formerly considered a wrasse and often classified within the fossil labrid genera Labrodon and Nummopalatus, more recent studies treat it as an extinct drumfish. It may be potentially ancestral to the extant genus Pogonias.

The following species are known:

- †D. ovalis von Schafhäutl, 1863 - Eocene of Bavaria, Germany
- †D. sauvagei (Leriche, 1900) - Late Paleocene, Early Eocene and Middle Eocene (Lutetian) of France (Paris Basin, including Falun de Pourcy Formation, Cuisien Formation & Lutetian limestone) and England (Blackheath Beds & London Clay) (=Nummulopalatus sauvagei Leriche, 1900, N. trapezoidalis Leriche, 1900)
- †D. trigonella von Schafhäutl, 1863 - Lutetian of Bavaria, Germany (Kressenberg Formation) (type species)
- †D. wilsoni Westgate, 1989 - Lutetian of Texas, USA (Laredo Formation) & Late Eocene (Priabonian) of Arkansas, USA (Jackson Group), potentially to the mid-Oligocene (late Rupelian) of Virginia, USA (Drummonds Corner beds within the Chesapeake Bay impact crater)

Based on the paleoenvironments of the formations from France and the United States that Diaphyodus is known from, it appears to have inhabited tropical estuarine habitats that were likely vegetated with mangrove forests, with dominance by Nypa palms. In some localities such as in the Late Paleocene of France, their teeth are particularly abundant.

The genus Eodiaphyodus from the Late Cretaceous was named after Diaphyodus and was also previously placed as a tentative drumfish alongside it, but more likely represents a phyllodontid.

== See also ==
- Prehistoric fish
- List of prehistoric bony fish
