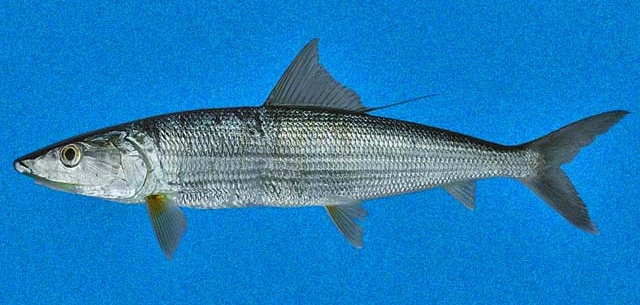

Scientific classification
- Domain: Eukaryota
- Kingdom: Animalia
- Phylum: Chordata
- Class: Actinopterygii
- Order: Albuliformes
- Family: Albulidae
- Genus: Albula
- Species: A. pacifica

Binomial name
- Albula pacifica (Beebe 1942)
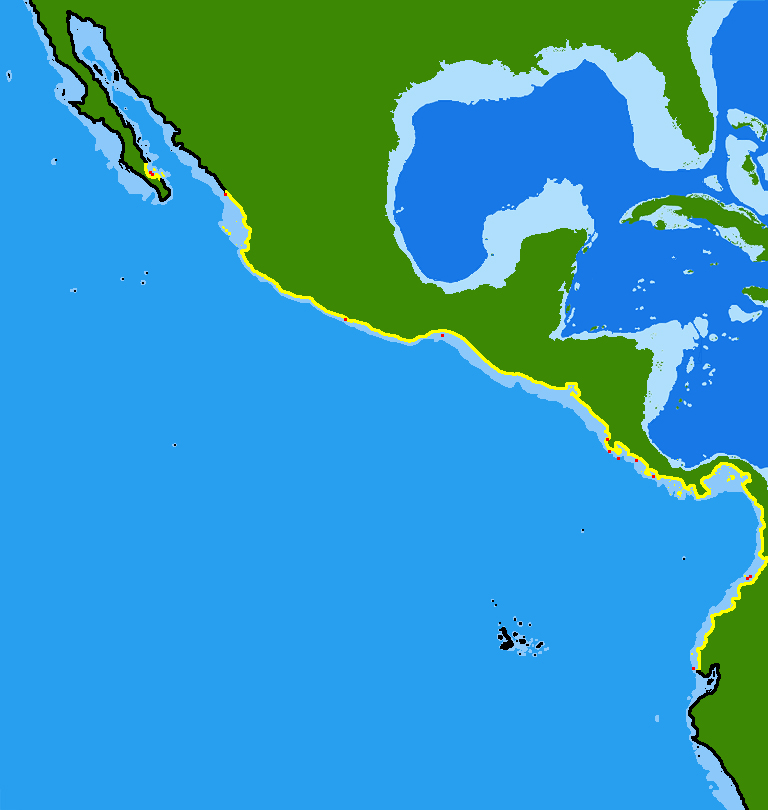

Synonyms
- Dixonina pacifica Beebe 1942

= Albula pacifica =

Species of fish

Albula pacifica also known as the Pacific shafted bonefish is a species of fish native to the eastern Pacific.

== History ==
Bonefish were once believed to be a single species with a global distribution, however 9 different species have since been identified. There are three identified species in the Atlantic and six in the Pacific.
