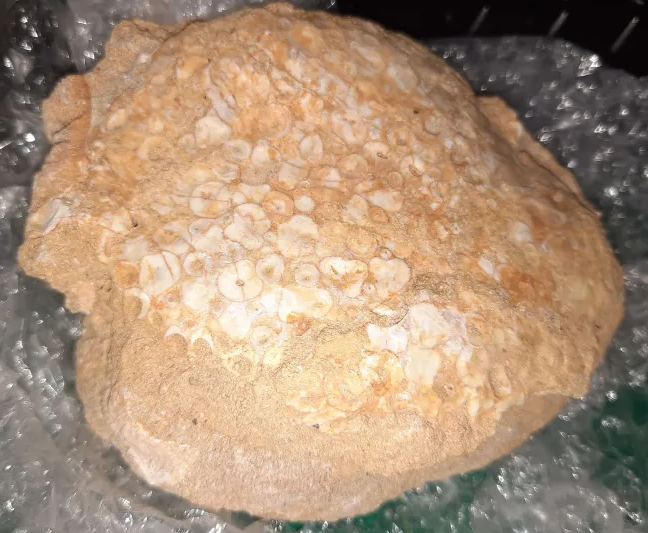
- Tooth plate of E. granulosus from Morocco

Scientific classification
- Kingdom: Animalia
- Phylum: Chordata
- Class: Actinopterygii
- Division: Teleostei
- Order: Albuliformes
- Family: †Phyllodontidae
- Genus: †Eodiaphyodus; Casier en Dartvelle & Casier, 1949

Type species
- †Eodiaphyodus lerichei Casier en Dartvelle & Casier, 1949

Species
- ?E. granulosus Arambourg, 1952; E. lerichei Casier en Dartvelle & Casier, 1949

= Eodiaphyodus =

Eodiaphyodus Temporal range: Late Cretaceous, Campanian–Maastrichtian

Extinct genus of fishes

Eodiaphyodus ("dawn Diaphyodus") is an extinct genus of marine phyllodont ray-finned fish known from Late Cretaceous sediments across Africa. As with other members of its family, it is primarily known by its fossilized tooth plates, which were likely found in the back of its throat and used to crush its food.

The following species are known:

- ?E. granulosus Arambourg, 1952 - Maastrichtian & potentially Paleocene of Morocco (Ouled Abdoun Basin) and potentially Nigeria (Benue Trough)
- E. lerichei Casier en Dartvelle & Casier, 1949 (type species) - Campanian to Maastrichtian of the Democratic Republic of the Congo and Angola

A potential third species, E. bebianoi Dartevelle & Casier, 1949 from the Paleocene of the Democratic Republic of the Congo, previously referred to Pseudoegertonia, may be a member of this genus, but it is thought to be too fragmentary for a proper taxonomic assessment. The species E. granulosus is also sometimes referred to Pseudoegertonia, though more recent studies do not follow this classification.

The oldest known specimens of Eodiaphyodus were found in Campanian rocks in Angola and Nigeria, and it is believed that the genus originated in this part of Africa before dispersing northwards (via the Atlantic coast of West Africa or via the trans-Saharan seaway) to reach northwestern Africa by the Maastrichtian.

== See also ==
- Coriops
- Flora and fauna of the Maastrichtian stage
- List of prehistoric bony fish (Osteichthyes)
