= Brittney Exline =

African-American engineer

- Born: February 14, 1992 (age 34); Colorado Springs, Colorado
- Occupation: Software engineer
- Known for: Youngest African-American Engineer
- Parent(s): Chyrese Exline; Christopher Exline

Brittney Exline is an American software engineer. She is the youngest African-American female to be accepted into an Ivy League school, at 15. She went on to become the United States' youngest African-American engineer.

== Life ==
Exline was born on Valentine's Day in Colorado Springs, Colorado to Chyrese and Christopher Exline. Brittney taught herself to read at age 2, and skipped three grades as a youth. She graduated from her high school's International Baccalaureate program. Exline also studied anthropology at Harvard University while in school. She went on to receive a full scholarship to the University of Pennsylvania in 2007 at 15, making her the youngest African-American to be accepted into an Ivy League school. While in college, she majored in engineering. In 2011, at the age of 19, she graduated cum laude with a bachelor's degree in computer science. After graduation, Exline became a software engineer for Chitika, an online advertising network.

== Interests ==
Exline volunteered with various community-based organizations in Philadelphia. She worked with the Community School Student Partnerships in Philadelphia while still at university. She also trained 30 tutors from Penn and worked as a kindergarten summer school teacher for Freedom Schools in Philadelphia, showing her interest in education.

She speaks many languages: English, Spanish, French, Japanese, Russian, Arabic and German.
