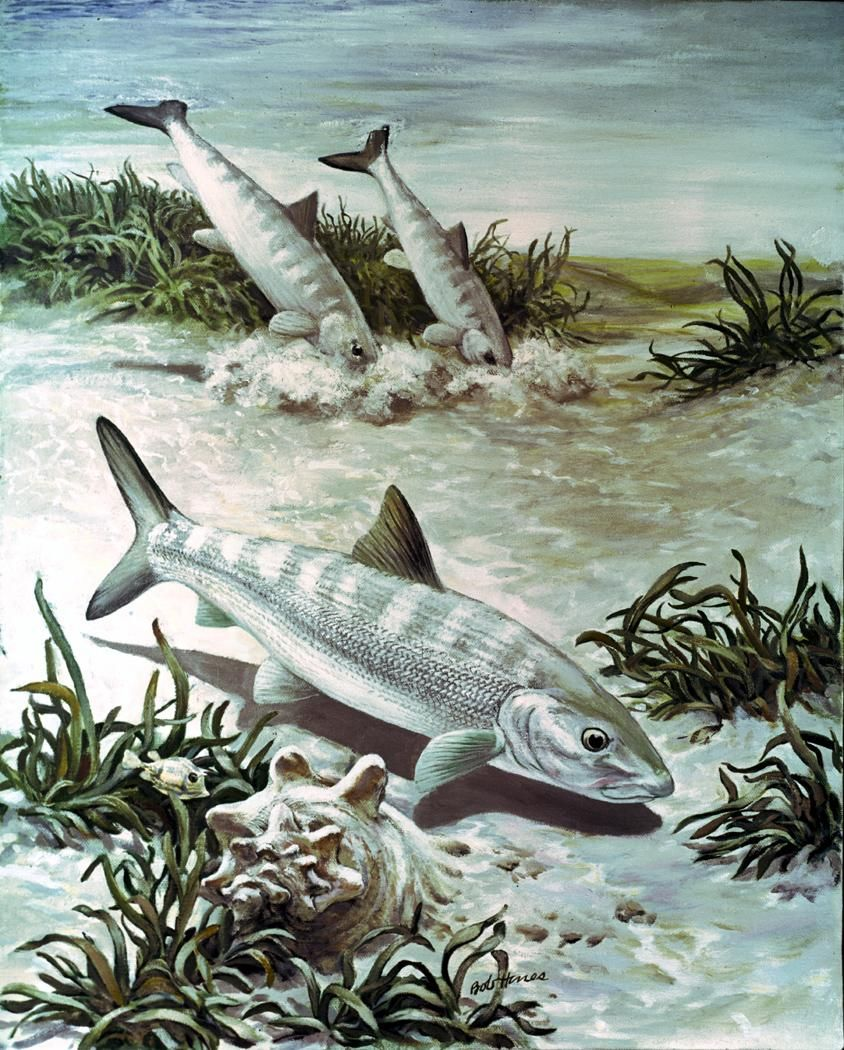
- Bonefish (A. vulpes)

Scientific classification
- Kingdom: Animalia
- Phylum: Chordata
- Class: Actinopterygii
- Order: Albuliformes
- Family: Albulidae
- Subfamily: Albulinae
- Genus: Albula; Gronow 1763 ex Scopoli 1777 non Osbeck 1765 non Bloch & Schneider 1801 non Catesby 1771

Synonyms
- Atopichthys Garman 1899; Butyrinus Commerson ex Lacépède 1803; Dixonina Fowler 1911; Albula (Dixonina) (Fowler 1911); Esunculus Kaup 1856; Glossodonta Cuvier 1815; Glossodus Agassiz 1828 ex Spix & Agassiz 1829 non Costa 1853 non McCoy 1848; Metalbula Frizzell 1965; Pisodus Owen 1841; Vulpis Catesby 1771; Conorynchus Nozemann 1758 ex Gill 1861 (Nomen oblitum per Whitehead 1986). Non Bleeker 1863 non Motschousky 1860

= Albula (fish) =

Albula Temporal range: 94.3–0 Ma Late Cretaceous to present

Genus of fishes

Albula is an ancient genus of fish belonging to the family Albulidae. Members of this genus inhabit warm coastal waters worldwide.

This genus contains many of the species popularly referred to as bonefish, which are vital components of both subsistence fisheries and sport fishing industries worldwide; this, in conjunction with destruction of breeding habitat, has led to population declines in many species.

== Taxonomy ==
Bonefish were once believed to be a single species with a global distribution; however, 11 distinct species have since been identified. There are three identified species in the Atlantic and eight in the Pacific. All species are morphologically indistinguishable from one another and can only be reliably distinguished with genetic evidence, but all of them diverged from one another between 4 and 20 million years ago.

The oldest fossils belonging to this genus are from the Late Cretaceous of Alabama and Uzbekistan.

=== Extant species ===
The 11 currently recognized living species in this genus are:

- Albula argentea (Forster 1801) (silver sharpjaw bonefish)
- Albula esuncula (Garman 1899) (Eastern Pacific bonefish)
- Albula gilberti Pfeiler, van der Heiden, Ruboyianes & Watts, 2011 (Cortez bonefish)
- Albula glossodonta (Forsskål, 1775) (Roundjaw/shortjaw bonefish)
- Albula goreensis Valenciennes, 1847 (West African bonefish)
- Albula koreana Kwun & Kim, 2011 (Korean bonefish)
- Albula nemoptera (Fowler, 1911) (Threadfin bonefish)
- Albula oligolepis Hidaka, Iwatsuki & Randall, 2008 (Smallscale bonefish)
- Albula pacifica (Beebe, 1942) (Pacific shafted bonefish)
- Albula virgata Jordan & Jordan, 1922 (Longjaw bonefish)
- Albula vulpes (Linnaeus, 1758) (bonefish)

=== Fossil species ===
- †Albula bartonensis Schedl 1933
- †Albula bashiana (Frizzell 1965) [Metalbula bashiana Frizzell 1965]
- †Albula campaniana Nolf & Stringer 1996
- †Albula dunklei Applegate 1970
- †Albula eppsi White & Frost 1931
- †Albula oweni (Agassiz 1844) [Pisodus owenii Agassiz 1844; Pisodus owenii Agassiz 1844]
