= Albula argentea =

Conservation status
- Data Deficient (IUCN 3.1)

Scientific classification
- Kingdom: Animalia
- Phylum: Chordata
- Class: Actinopterygii
- Order: Albuliformes
- Family: Albulidae
- Genus: Albula
- Species: A. argentea

Binomial name
- Albula argentea (Forster, 1801)

Synonyms
- Esox argenteus Forster, 1801 non Gmelin 1789; Synodus argenteus Forster 1801 ex Schneider 1801; Albula forsteri Valenciennes, 1847; Albula neoguinaica Valenciennes, 1847; Albula seminuda Valenciennes, 1847

Species of fish

Albula argentea, the silver sharpjaw bonefish, 'ō'io, or simply sharpjaw bonefish, is a species of bonefish found in the tropical Western Pacific Ocean.

The name 'ō'io may refer to other species of bonefish in Hawaii, such as the longjaw bonefish Albula virgata, and the roundjaw/shortjaw bonefish Albula glossodonta.

== Taxonomy and nomenclature ==
Bonefish were once believed to be a single species with a global distribution, but 11 different species have since been identified.

Albula virgata (the longjaw bonefish) and Albula oligolepis (the smallscale bonefish) were formerly assigned to this species, but are now recognized as distinct. A. virgata is only found around the Hawaiian islands, while A. argentea has a wider distribution.

== Description ==
Sharpjaw bonefish grow up to 70 cm (28 in). Like other bonefish, they have an elongated, silvery white body, with large scales.
