= Shortjaw bonefish =

Conservation status
- Vulnerable (IUCN 3.1)

Scientific classification
- Kingdom: Animalia
- Phylum: Chordata
- Class: Actinopterygii
- Order: Albuliformes
- Family: Albulidae
- Genus: Albula
- Species: A. glossodonta

Binomial name
- Albula glossodonta (Forsskål, 1775)

Synonyms
- Argentina glossodonta Forsskål 1775; Glossodonta glossodontus (Forsskål 1775); Argentina bonuk Lacepède 1803; Albula erythrocheilos Valenciennes 1847

Species of fish

Albula glossodonta (roundjaw bonefish, shortjaw bonefish, Indo-Pacific bonefish, sharpjaw bonefish, 'ō'io, or smallmouth bonefish is a type of bonefish found in the Pacific Ocean. Shortjaw bonefish are important to food security throughout the coastal Pacific, where they are native, as Pacific island communities depend on this fish for food. However, the species has become depleted throughout much of its range.

The name 'ō'io may refer to other species of bonefish in Hawaii, such as the longjaw bonefish Albula virgata, and the sharpjaw bonefish Albula argentea.

== Taxonomy and nomenclature ==
Bonefish were once believed to be a single species with a global distribution, however, 11 different species have since been identified.

== Description ==
Shortjaw bonefish may weigh over 8.6 kilograms (19 lb) and be 90 cm (35 in), making them one of the largest species of bonefish. Like other bonefish, they have an elongated, silvery white body, with large scales.

== Angling ==
Recreational angling for shortjaw bonefish is popular in Hawaii, Cook Islands, Christmas Island, and French Polynesia. Anglers must be cautious when angling in some Pacific destinations because of the high rates of post-release predation that released bonefish can experience with sharks. Reef sharks on sandy flats are highly capable predators that can detect injured or stressed bonefish, and research has shown that high numbers of bonefish can be eaten very soon after release. When angling, bonefish should be brought in quickly with extremely limited handling. Faster release yields better outcomes for bonefish that are captured by anglers. Flats with high densities of sharks should be scrutinized by anglers before fishing.
