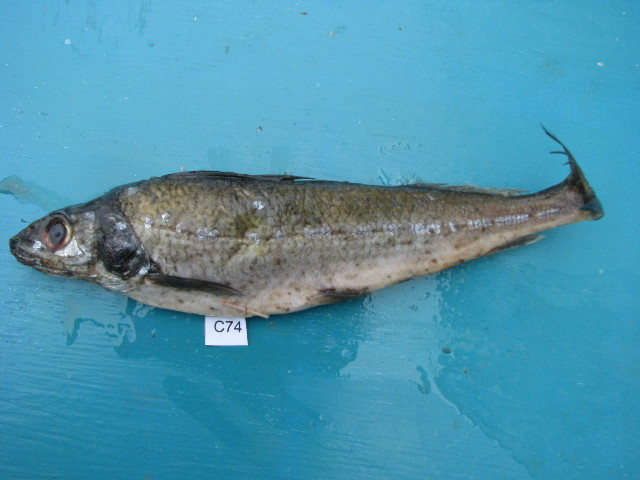

Conservation status
- Data Deficient (IUCN 3.1)

Scientific classification
- Kingdom: Animalia
- Phylum: Chordata
- Class: Actinopterygii
- Division: Teleostei
- Order: Albuliformes
- Family: Albulidae
- Subfamily: Pterothrissinae
- Genus: Nemoossis; Hidaka, Tsukamoto & Iwatsuki, 2016
- Species: N. belloci

Binomial name
- Nemoossis belloci (Cadenat, 1937)

Synonyms
- Pterothrissus belloci Cadenat, 1937; Istieus belloci (Cadenat, 1937)

= Long-fin bonefish =

Species of ray-finned fish

Nemoossis belloci, also known as the long-fin bonefish, is a species of ray-finned fish in the family Albulidae endemic to the eastern Atlantic Ocean. This species is the only member of its genus.
