= Harriet Exline Frizzell =

American arachnologist (1909–1968)

Harriet Idola Exline Frizzell (1909, Washington – 1968) was an American arachnologist. She was the first woman to receive the Sterning Fellowship at Yale University.

== Life and education ==
Harriet Exline Lloyd was born in Washington in 1909. At the age of sixteen, she entered Reed College to study language and literature, but soon became interested in chemistry and biology. After that, she did a six-year graduate study at the University of Washington, spending her summers and Fridays at Harbor Biological Station.

In 1936, Exline earned her PhD at the University of Washington and was awarded the Sterning Fellowship at Yale University for postdoctoral studies in arachnological research with Professor Alexander Petrunkevitch. She was the first woman to receive this scholarship.

On 29 August 1938, Exline married a fellow scientist, Donald L. Frizzell, in Guayaquil, Ecuador. She chose marriage over fellowship renewal and sailed for Peru at the end of academic year. They remained in Ecuador and Peru for the next five years, working together and individually on arachnology and paleontology research.

== Work ==
In September 1943, they went to Seattle. She stayed there until the end of World War II, working as an instructor in the zoology department at the University of Washington. Having finished the academic year at the university in 1945, Exline joined her husband in Austin, Texas. For the next three years, she worked as a guest researcher in spiders in the Department of Zoology at the University of Texas.

In 1948, the Frizzels moved to Rolla, where she continued her research on spiders at the University of Missouri. During this time, she was named a fellow and research associate of the California Academy of Sciences.

Exline worked jointly with her husband on holothurian sclerites and co-authored with him a Monograph of fossil holothurian sclerites, published in 1955.

In 1958, Don L. Frizzel wrote that his wife was deeply involved in micropaleontological research and co-authored with him three papers. In 1958–1959, she went on a holiday trip to the Gulf Coast, where she collected spiders and continued her spider studies.

From 1960 until 1967, she worked as a taxonomist and consultant for a National Science Foundation project in spider biology at the University of Arkansas. She devoted around a third of her time to this project.

Exline also completed a considerable amount of work in her home laboratory, in which she had personally curated a sizeable collection of spiders.

She published American Spiders of the Genus Argyrodes (Araneae, Theridiidae) in 1962. The researcher Arthur M. Chickering described it as "the most comprehensive work published to date on this highly interesting but difficult genus of "comb-footed" spiders".

After the death of Alexander Petrunkevitch in 1964, Exline organized, edited and published his previously unpublished works.

In September 1967, Exline's health rapidly declined and she was hospitalized. She died in February 1968. After her death, her spider collections were given to the California Academy.

The Harriet Exline Frizzell Memorial Fund was created in her honour.

== Bibliography (selected) ==
- 1935. "Three new species of Cybaeus. Pan-Pacific Entomol. 11(3):129-132.. S
- 1936. "Pycnogonids from Puget Sound. Proc. U.S. Nat. Mus. 83(2991):413-422.
- 1936. "New and little known species of Tegenaria (Araneida: Agelenidae)". Psyche 43(1):21-26.
- 1936. "Nearctic spiders of the genus Cicurina Menge". Am. Mus. Novitates 850:1-22.
- 1937. "The Araneida of Washington: Pholcidae, Argiopidae, Agelenidae, Hahniidae, Attidae". Univ. Washington Publ. Theses Ser. 2:717.
- 1938. "Gynandromorph spiders". J. Morph. 63(3):441-472.
- 1945. "A new group of the genus Conopistha Karsch, 1881". Trans. Connecticut Acad. Arts. Sci. 36:177-190.
- 1945. "Spiders of the genus Conopistha (Theridiidae, Conopisthinae) from northwestern Peru and Ecuador". Ann. Entomol. Soc. Am. 38(4):505-528.
- 1948. "Morphology, habits and systematic position of Allepeira lemniscata (Walckenaer) (Araneida: Argiopidae, Allepeirinae)". Ann. Entomol. Soc. Am. 41(3):309-325.
- 1950. "Conopisthine spiders (Theridiiae) from Peru and Ecuador" in: Studies Honoring Trevor Kincaid. Univ. Washington Press. pp. 108–124.
- 1951. Tegenaria agrestis (Walckenaer), a European agelenid spider introduced into Washington State". Ann. Entomol. Soc. Am. 44(3):308-310.
- 1956. (with D. L. Frizzell). "Monograph of fossil holothurian sclerites". Univ. Missouri, School Mines & Metallurgy Bull., Tech. Ser. 89:1-204.
- 1958. (with D. L. Frizzell). "Crustacean gastroliths from the Claiborne Eocene of Texas". Micropaleontology 4(3):273-280.
- 1960. "Rhocinine spiders (Pisauridae) of Western South America". Proc. California Acad. Sci. 4th Ser. 29(17):577-620.
- 1962. "Two gnaphosid spiders from Arkansas". Proc. California Acad. Sci. 4th Ser. 32(4):70-85.
- 1963. (and Whitcomb and Hite). "Comparison of spider populations of the ground stratum in Arkansas pasture and adjacent cultivated field". Arkansas Acad. Sci. Proc. 17:1-6.
- 1965. (and Whitcomb). "Clarification of the mating procedure of Peucetia viridans (Araneida: Oxyopidae) by microscopic examination of the epigynal plug". Florida Entomol. 48(3):169-171.
