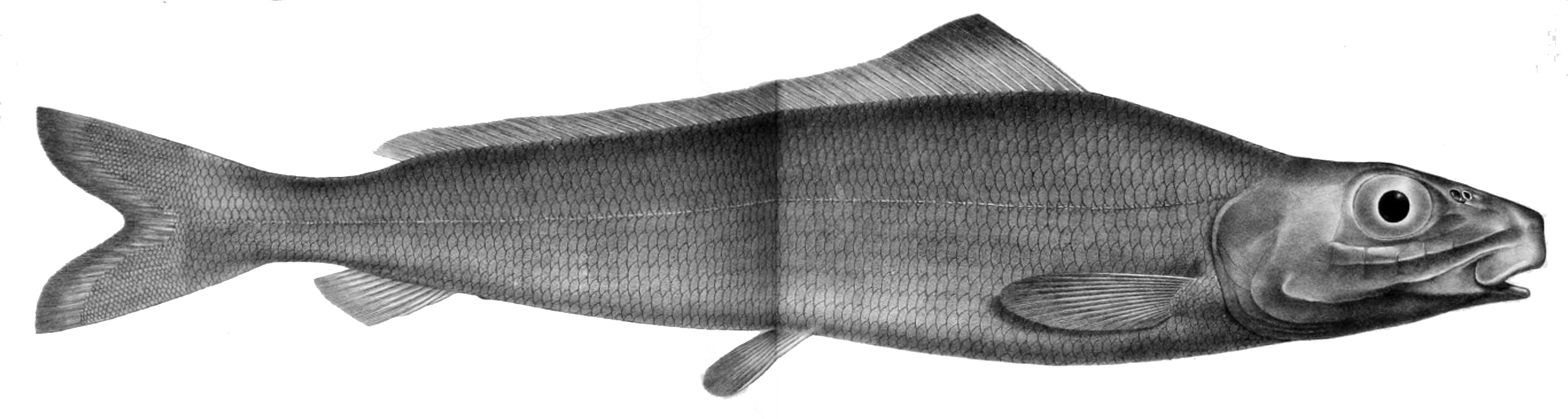

Conservation status
- Data Deficient (IUCN 3.1)

Scientific classification
- Kingdom: Animalia
- Phylum: Chordata
- Class: Actinopterygii
- Division: Teleostei
- Order: Albuliformes
- Family: Albulidae
- Subfamily: Pterothrissinae
- Genus: Pterothrissus; Hilgendorf, 1877
- Species: P. gissu

Binomial name
- Pterothrissus gissu Hilgendorf, 1877

Synonyms
- Genus: Bathythrissa Günther, 1877; Species: Istieus gissu (Hilgendorf, 1877); Bathythrissa dorsalis Günther, 1877

= Japanese gissu =

Species of ray-finned fish

Pterothrissus gissu, also known as the Japanese gissu, is a species of ray-finned fish in the family Albulidae. The Japanese gissu is an extremely rare marine fish that is distributed in deep water off northwest Pacific Ocean. Due to its natural habitat being in deep offshore waters, there is a lack of sufficient data on the Japanese gissu. This fish is known to pass through a leptocephalus larval stage, but only metamorphosed (after reaching the fully grown stage) specimens have been available This species is the only member of its genus.

== Description ==
P. gissu has a slender, fusiform shape with an oval cross-section. Morphological records show that P. gissu have dorsal-fin rays 54–65, total vertebrae 105–107, lateral-line scales 99–109, and pre-dorsal scale rows 13–20 Head length is approximately 23–31% SL, pectoral-fin length 10–18% SL, and dorsal-fin base length 47–56% SL. Larvae are leptocephali, reaching up to 194 mm SL before metamorphosis.

== Distribution and habitat ==
P. gissu occurs in deep shelf waters of the northwestern Pacific, primarily off the coast of Japan, including areas around Hokkaido and the East China Sea. It is a deep-water species, typically recorded from bathyal zones, but exact depth ranges are not well established. Occurrence records are cataloged in the Global Biodiversity Information Facility (GBIF) and museum collections.

== Biology ==
P. gissu larvae are transparent, laterally compressed, and drift in open ocean currents before metamorphosis. There is a large lack of scientific research on the size of the gissu over time in its growth process, and on their feeding behavior. Specific details on the fish’s diet are limited, but like many deep-sea fishes, it is likely to feed on small invertebrates and fishes. The species has large eyes and silvery pigmentation, adaptations which are very common to deep-water environments. Their growth rates, age at maturity, and fecundity have barely been studied at all. Additional field and lab research is needed to clarify its ecological role and life-history strategy

== Human uses ==
P. gissu has limited, but notable, interactions with humans, mostly in local Japanese fisheries and traditional food preparation. Many records of P. gissu are found online in Japanese or Chinese language, indicating they are mostly used in coastal Asia.

=== Food ===
The meat of P. gissu is used in the production of kamaboko (traditional Japanese fish cake) in the Odawara region. These fish cakes are made of cured, processed gissu (or other white fish). A study examined the gelling properties of gissu meat during heating, finding that certain processing steps (such as premature heating at around 35 °C) reduce gel strength, while direct heating (as used historically) creates a gel with greater breaking force

=== Recreational fishing ===
The fish is occasionally caught by anglers. The Japanese game-fishing authority has a record of a P. gissu weighing 0.98 kg caught in 2015 off Misaki-nishi, Kanagawa Prefecture.

=== Scientific and museum specimens ===
Some gissu have been collected and preserved for scientific study, especially in fisheries research institutes and specimen collections. For example, multiple whole fish specimens (length ~490–500 mm, weight ~575-630 g) from Taitung, Chenggong (Taiwan) were preserved for morphological work.

== Conservation status ==
P. gissu is currently listed as Data Deficient by the International Union for Conservation of Nature (IUCN). Its most recent assessment was in 2011. Since it lives in deep waters, bycatch from deep-sea trawling and habitat disturbance threaten the population. Data limitations make it difficult to analyze population trends or specific threats to this species. There is very limited data on the population trends and habitat threats. Improved monitoring is needed to support conservation measures.
