= Donald L. Frizzell =

American paleontologist, geologist and malacologist

Donald Leslie Frizzell (19 October 1906, in Bellingham, Washington – 17 October 1972, in Jefferson City, Missouri) was an American paleontologist, geologist and malacologist. He is honored in the bivalve name Pitar frizzelli Hertlein & Strong, 1948.

== Early life and education ==
Don L. Frizzell was born on 19 October 1906 in Bellingham, Washington. He attended grade school in White Bird, Idaho.

In 1926, Frizzell entered the University of Washington in Seattle where he received master's degree in zoology under the direction of Professor Kincaid. During 1930–1931, he published three papers in Nautilus and one more paper on the new molluscan species. In summer 1931, Frizzell worked as a junior paleontologist with the Northwest Experiment Station, U.S. Bureau of Mines in Seattle.

In autumn 1931, Frizzell started a five-year doctorate in paleontology at Stanford University. Pursuing graduate school, he received several fellowships such as Jacob Fellow in 1931–1932, Scholar in 1933–1934, and Jordan Fellow in 1934.

== Career ==
After graduating from Stanford in 1936, Frizzell started working for Shell Oil Company as a micropaleontologist. However, he did not consider this job very promising and left it a year later. In 1937, he joined the International Petroleum Corporation spending next 7 years working in the oil field of Peru and Ecuador.

On 29 August 1938, Frizzell married an American arachnologist Harriet Exline Lloyd in Guayaquil, Ecuador.

In 1939, Frizzell was in M. Smith's 2nd International Directory of Malacologists in Negritos, Peru, and in 1943, M. Smith's International Directory of Malacologists in Guayaquil, Ecuador.

In January 1945, Frizzell accepted an offer to work as an associate professor in geology department at the University of Texas in Austin. In 1946–1948, he spent summers working as a geologist for the Texas Bureau of Economic Geology in Austin.

In 1948, Frizzell moved to Rolla and started working in the Department of Geology at the University of Missouri School of Mines and Metallurgy. At the University of Missouri Frizzell taught micropaleontology, paleontology, petroleum geology, and later also stratigraphic paleontology.

Having completed work on Foraminitera Frizzell opened new avenues of study in the area of holothurian sclerites. Monograph of fossil holothurian sclerites, written jointly with his wife Harriet Exline, was published in 1955.

In 1959, Frizzell was awarded a National Science Foundation grant for a two-year (1959 to 1961) study of "Recent otoliths and the Eocene-Oligocene otoliths of the Gulf Coast".

Frizzell kept teaching activities until September 1972. He died at Jefferson City, Missouri, in Still Hospital on 17 October 1972.

Frizzell is honored in the bivalve name Pitar frizzelli Hertlein & Strong, 1948.

== Books and publications ==
- 1928. Frizzell, Don L. "Pododesmus macroschisma Deshayes". In: Nautilus 42(2): 67 & 43(3) 104 (1930)
- 1930. Frizzell, Don L. "A new Pleistocene fossil from Port Blakely, Washington". In: Nautilus 43(4): 120–21.
- 1930. Frizzell, Don L. "Variation in the sculpture of Acila castrensis Hinds". Nautilus 44(2): 50–53
- 1930. Frizzell, Don L. "Schizothaerus nuttalli capax Gld. not maxima Midd". Nautilus 44(2): 69
- 1930. Frizzell, D. L. "The status of Paphia tenerrima alta Waterfall". The Nautilus 44(2): 48–50
- 1931. Frizzell, Don L. "A Molluscan Species New to the Recent West Coast Fauna". In: Trans. San Diego Soc. Nat. Hist., Vol. VI, No. 21, pp 319–24, plate 22
- 1935. Frizzell, Donald Leslie. Studies in the molluscan superfamily Veneracea. Stanford University Press. 262 pages
- 1935. Frizzell, Don L. "Bivalves of the genus Protothaca". In: Proc. Geol. Soc. Amer. for 1934: 387–88.
- 1936. Miller, R.C. & Don L. Frizzell. "Key to the pelecypod genera of Puget Sound". In: Proc. Geol. Soc. Amer. for 1935: 415
- 1936. Frizzell, D. L. Preliminary reclassification of veneracean pelecypods. Musée Royal d'Histoire Naturelle de Belgique, Bulletin 12(34): 84 pp.
- 1953 (with A. Myra Keen). Illustrated Key to West North American Pelecypod Genera. Stanford Univ. Press
- 1955 (with Harriet Exline). Monograph of fossil holothurian sclerites.
