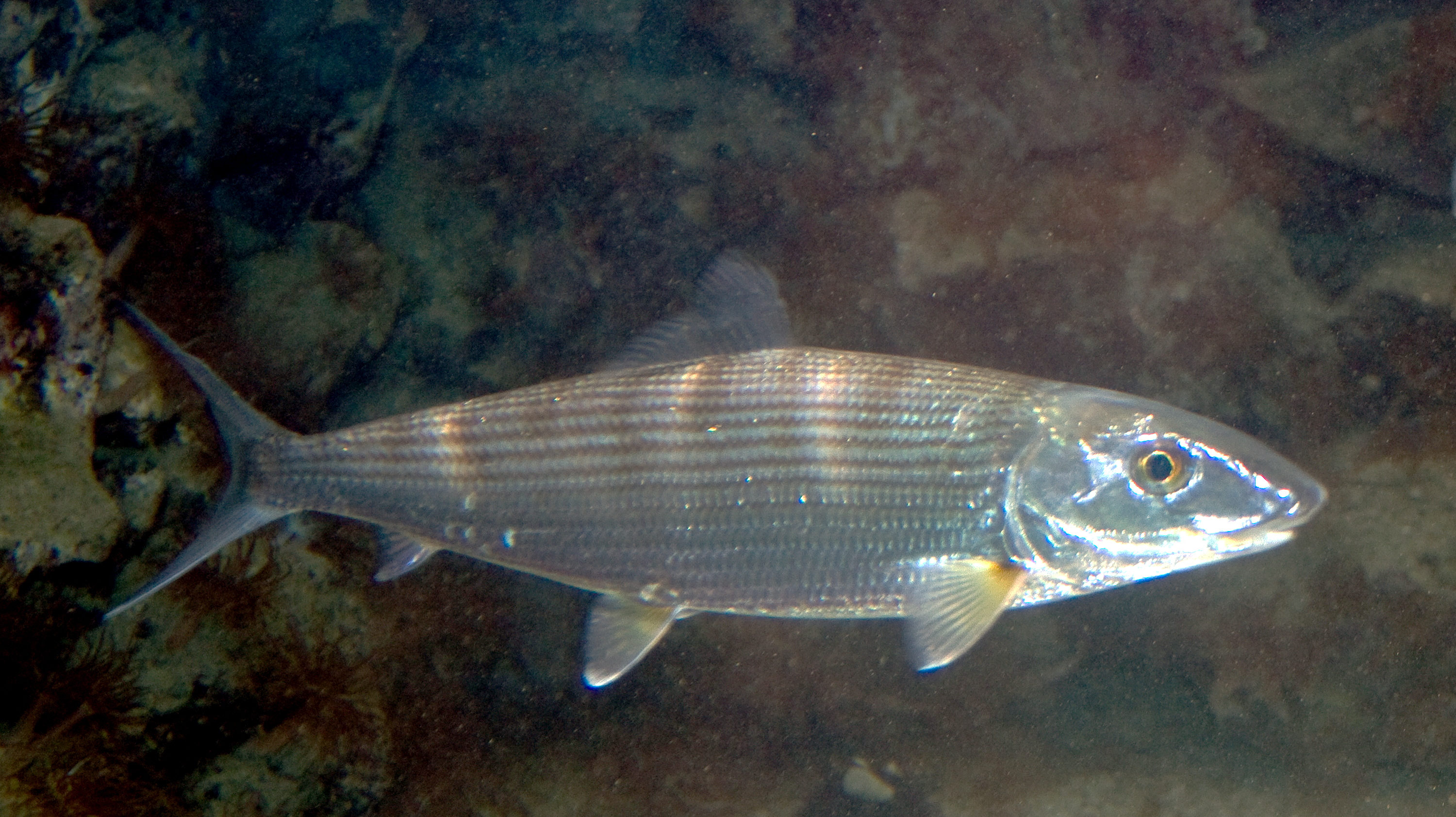
- Albula vulpes
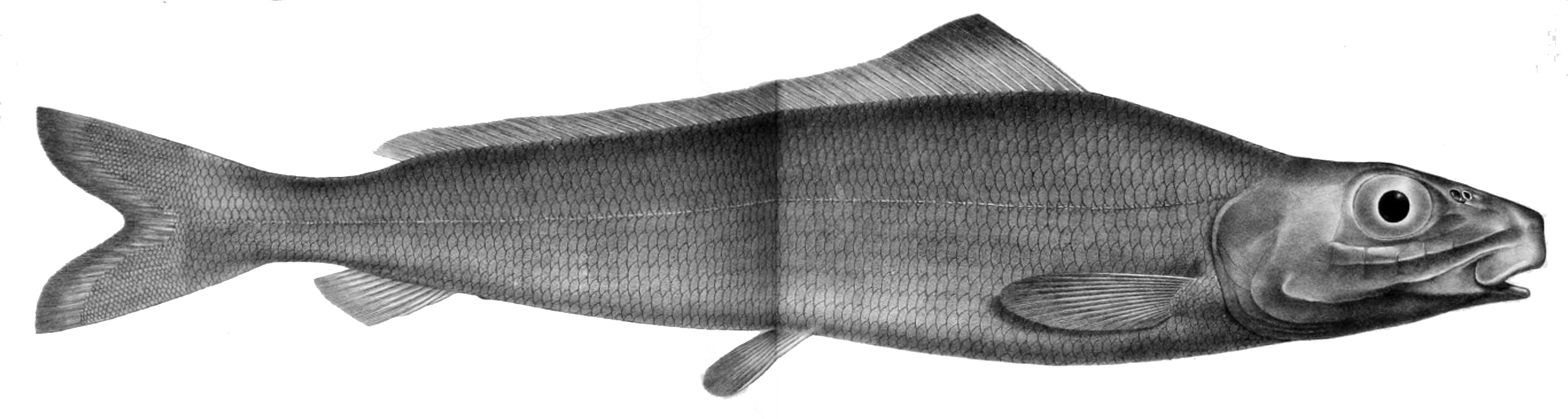
- Pterothrissus gissu

Scientific classification
- Kingdom: Animalia
- Phylum: Chordata
- Class: Actinopterygii
- Division: Teleostei
- Superorder: Elopomorpha
- Order: Albuliformes; Greenwood, 1977
- Family: Albulidae; Bleeker, 1859

Type species
- Albula vulpes (Linnaeus, 1758)

Genera
- Albula Scopoli, 1777; Nemoossis Hidaka, Tsukamoto & Iwatsuki, 2016; Pterothrissus Hilgendorf, 1877

Synonyms
- Albulae Bleeker 1849; Butirini Bleeker 1851; Lemniscati Poey 1867; Bathythrissidae Günther 1877; Pterothrissidae Gill 1893; Conorhynchidae Gill 1861

= Bonefishes =

Bonefishes Temporal range: Kimmeridgian–0 Late Jurassic to Recent

Family of fishes

Albulidae is a family of fish, commonly known as the bonefishes, that are popular as game fish in Florida, select locations in the South Pacific and the Bahamas (where two bonefish are featured on the 10-cent coin) and elsewhere. The family is small, with 11 species in 3 genera. Presently, the bonefishes are in their own order: Albuliformes /ˈælbjəlɪfɔːrmiːz/. The families Halosauridae and Notacanthidae were previously classified in this order, but are now, according to FishBase, given their own order Notacanthiformes. The largest bonefish caught in the Western Hemisphere is a 16-pound, 3 ounce example caught off Islamorada, Florida, on March 19, 2007.

== Description ==
=== Albula ===
The bonefishes' closest relatives are the tarpons and ladyfishes in the order Elopiformes. Bonefishes are unlike tarpons in that their mouths are under the snout rather than the end of it. Like tarpons and ladyfishes, bonefishes can breathe air via a modified swim bladder and are found in brackish waters. Bonefish larvae are leptocephalic.

The slender body of the bonefish is silver, with a blue to green tinted back. On the upper half of the body there are dark streaks with cross bands connecting to the lateral line. The body is rounded with a long, slightly downturned snout. The dorsal and caudal fins are black. Bonefish vary in adult length from 40–100 cm depending on species. The average size of a bonefish is from 3 to 5 pounds (1–2 kg) with the Florida record being 16 pounds 3 oz (7.34 kg).

The bonefishes are brackish or saltwater fish typically living in estuaries and travelling out to sea to spawn on a lunar cycle. They feed in the shallow sand and mud flats, on benthic organisms, such as worms, mollusks, shrimp and crabs. They use their conical-shaped snouts to root out their prey and can often be seen with their tails out of the water. Bonefishes possess crushing teeth in their palates.

=== Nemoossis and Pterothrissus ===
These genera are similar to Albula, except they can be found in deeper waters.

== Taxonomy ==
- Order Albuliformes Greenwood et al. 1966 sensu Forey et al. 1996 [Albuloidea Hay; Albuloidei; Albulina Günther 1868]
  - Genus †Albulelops Averjanov, Nesov & Udovichenko 1993
  - Genus †Albulidarum [Otolith]
  - Genus †Albuloideorum [Otolith]
  - Genus †Brannerion Jordan 1920
  - Genus †Bullichthys Mayrinck, Brito & Otero, 2010
  - Genus †Cyclotomodon Cope 1876
  - Genus †Phosphonatator Cavin et al. 2000
  - Family †Phyllodontidae Sauvage 1875 corrig. Jordan 1923 [Phyllodidae Sauvage 1875; Euphyllodontinae Dartevelle & Casier 1943/1949; Pseudophyllodontidae Dartevelle & Casier 1943/1949]
    - Genus †Ardiodus White 1931
    - Subfamily †Paralbulinae Estes 1969
      - Genus †Baugeichthys Filleul 2000
      - Genus †Casierius Estes 1969
      - Genus †Paralbula Blake 1940
      - Genus †Pseudoegertonia Dartevelle & Casier 1949 [Eodiaphyodus Arambourg 1952]
    - Subfamily †Phyllodontinae Dartevelle & Casier 1949
      - Genus †Egertonia Cocchi 1866
      - Genus †Phyllodus Agassiz 1839
  - Family Albulidae Bleeker 1849
    - Subfamily Pterothrissinae Gill 1893
      - Genus †Chicolepis Cockerell 1919
      - Genus †Hajulia Woodward 1942
      - Genus †Istieus Agassiz 1844 [Histieus Agassiz 1846 ]
      - Genus †Pterothrissidarum Nolf & Dockery 1990 [Otolith]
      - Genus †Thrissipteroides
      - Genus Nemoossis Hidaka, Tsukamoto & Iwatsuki 2016
      - Genus Pterothrissus Hilgendorf 1877 [Bathythrissa Günther 1877 ]
    - Subfamily Albulinae Bleeker 1849 [Dixoninidi Fowler 1958; Butirinidi Rafinesque 1810]
      - Genus †Archaealbula Winkler 1878
      - Genus †Eoalbula Frizzell 1965
      - Genus †Cycloides Winkler 1878
      - Genus †Kleinpellia David 1946
      - Genus †Macabi L-Recinos, Cantalice, Caballero-Viñas & Alvarado-Ortega, 2023
      - Genus †Palealbula Frizzell 1965
      - Genus †Prealbula Frizzell 1965
      - Genus †Protalbula Frizzell 1965
      - Genus †Pteralbula Stinton 1973
      - Genus †Lebonichthys Forey 1973
      - Genus †Deltaichthys Fielitz & Bardack 1992
      - Genus Albula Gronow 1763 ex Scopoli 1777 non Osbeck 1765 non Bloch & Schneider 1801 non Catesby 1771 [Atopichthys Garman 1899; Butyrinus Commerson ex Lacépède 1803; Dixonina Fowler 1911; Albula (Dixonina) (Fowler 1911); Esunculus Kaup 1856; Glossodonta Cuvier 1815; Glossodus Agassiz 1828 ex Spix & Agassiz 1829 non Costa 1853 non McCoy 1848; Metalbula Frizzell 1965; Pisodus Owen 1841; Vulpis Catesby 1771; Conorynchus Nozemann 1758 ex Gill 1861 non Bleeker 1863 non Motschousky 1860]

== See also ==
- Flats fishing
