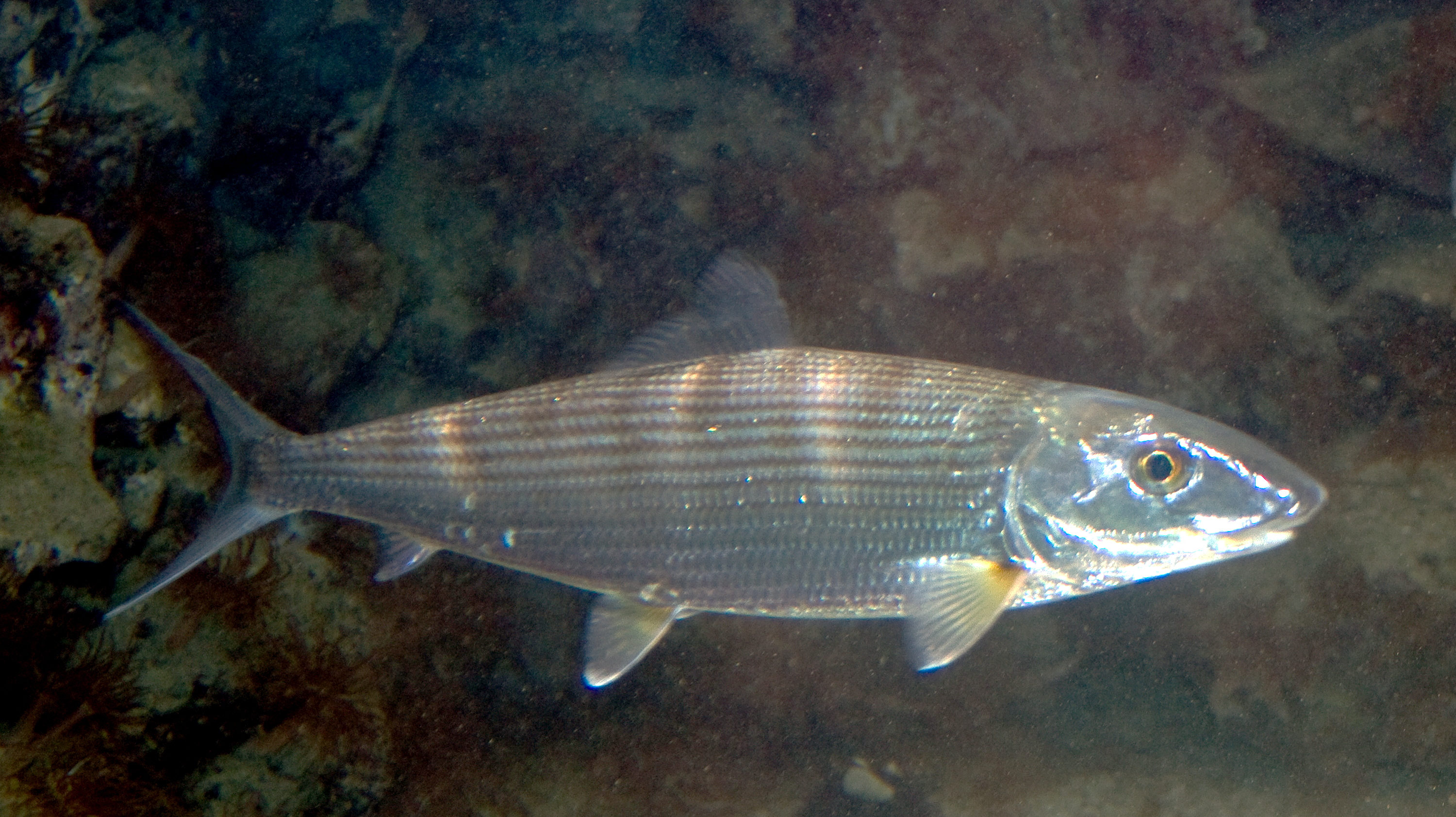

Conservation status
- Near Threatened (IUCN 3.1)

Scientific classification
- Kingdom: Animalia
- Phylum: Chordata
- Class: Actinopterygii
- Division: Teleostei
- Order: Albuliformes
- Family: Albulidae
- Genus: Albula
- Species: A. vulpes

Binomial name
- Albula vulpes (Linnaeus, 1758)

Synonyms
- Species: Esox vulpes Linnaeus, 1758; Vulpis vulpes (Linnaeus, 1758); ?Albula lacustris Walbaum, 1792; Albula conoryncha Bloch & Schneider, 1801; Clupea brasiliensis Bloch & Schneider, 1801 non Steindachner, 1879; Albula plumieri Bloch & Schneider, 1801; Amia immaculata Bloch & Schneider, 1801; Clupea macrocephala Lacépède, 1803; Conorynchus macrocephalus (Lacépède, 1803); ?Butyrinus bananus Lacepède, 1803; Glossodus forskalii Spix & Agassiz, 1829; Engraulis bahiensis Spix, 1829; Engraulis serica Spix, 1829; Albula parrae Valenciennes, 1847; Albula goreensis Valenciennes, 1847; Esunculus costai Kaup, 1856; Vulpis bahamensis Catesby, 1771; Albulas gronovii Walbaum, 1792; Albula rostrata Gronow, 1854; ?Albula unbarana Marcgrave ex de Castelnau, 1855

= Bonefish =

Species of fish

The bonefish (Albula vulpes) or bananafish is the type species of the bonefish family (Albulidae), the only family in order Albuliformes.

== Taxonomy ==
Bonefish were once believed to be a single species with a global distribution, however 11 different species (all morphologically indistinguishable from each other) have since been identified. There are 3 identified species in the Atlantic and 8 in the Pacific, and Albula vulpes is the largest and most widespread of the Atlantic species.

== Distribution ==
The bonefish inhabits warm subtropical and tropical waters of the western Atlantic, and is found off the coasts of southern Florida, in the Gulf of Mexico, and around the West Indies.

== Description ==
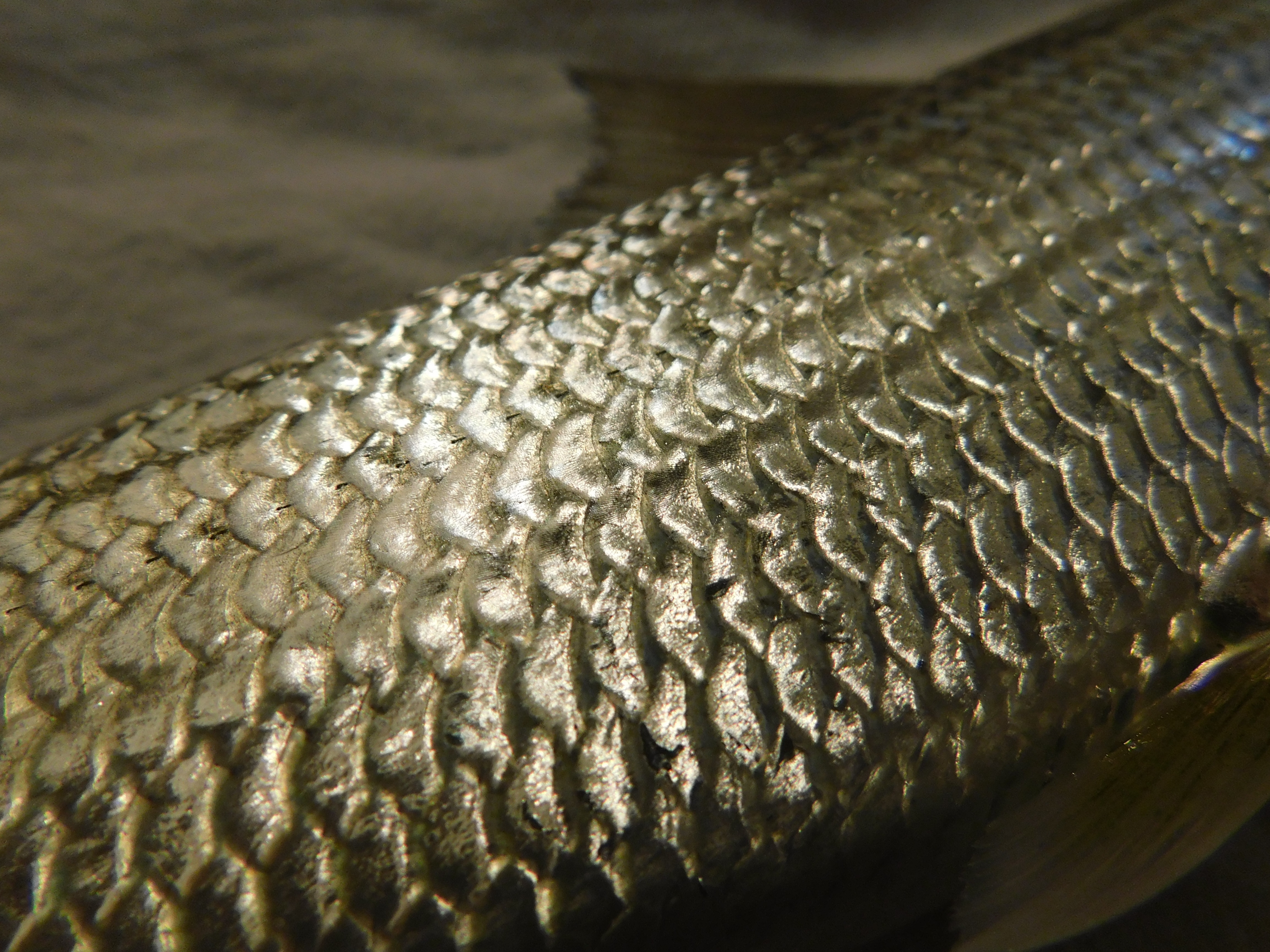
Scales of A. vulpes

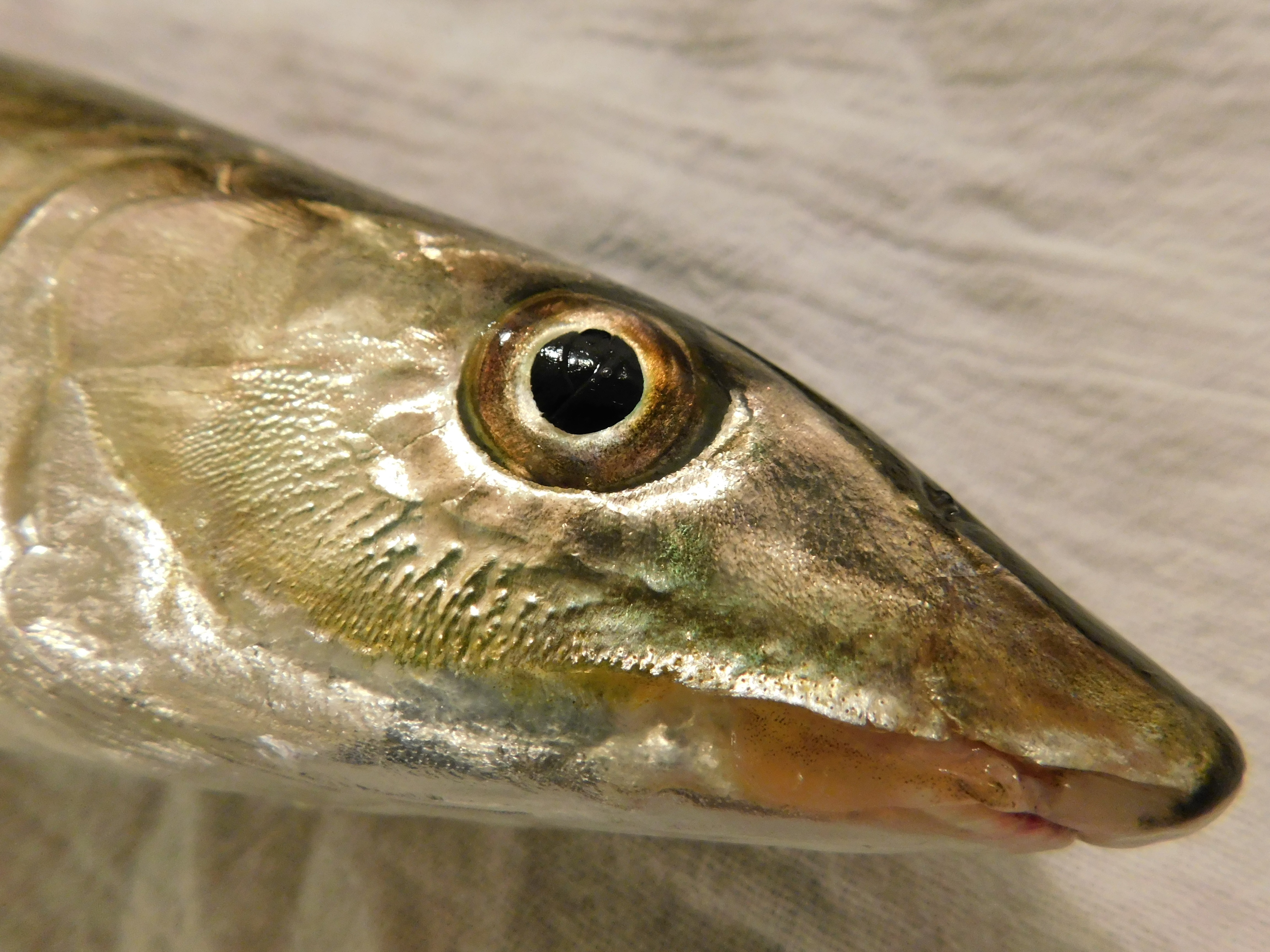
Bonefish head

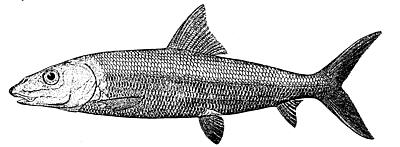
Illustration

The bonefish weighs up to 17 lb (7.7 kg) and measures up to 31 in (79 cm) long. The color of bonefish can range from very silver sides and slight darker backs to olive green backs that blend to the silver side. Slight shading on the scales often leads to very soft subtle lines that run the flank of the fish from the gills to the tail. The bases of the pectoral fins are sometimes yellow.

The bonefish can live up to 20 years but reach sexual maturity at merely 2 to 3 years of age (when it is over 17 in (43 cm) long). Larvae drift for an average of 53 days, and juveniles often live over open sandy bottoms.

== Behavior ==
An amphidromous species, the bonefish lives in inshore tropical waters and moves onto shallow mudflats or sand flats to feed with the incoming tide. Adults and juveniles may shoal together, and mature adults may be found singly or in pairs.

The bonefish feeds on benthic worms, fry, crustaceans, and mollusks and may be seen around edges, drop-offs, and clean, healthy seagrass beds, as these locations yield abundant small prey such as crabs and shrimp. It may follow stingrays to catch the small animals they scare out of the substrate.

In the Los Roques archipelago, bonefish primarily hunt glass minnows, however this behavior is atypical.

== Relationship with humans ==
=== Fishing ===
The bonefish is considered to be one of the premier fly and light tackle game fish. Fishing for bonefish, called bonefishing, is a popular sport in many places including the Bahamas, Puerto Rico, and southern Florida. Since the bonefish lives in shallow inshore water, fishing may be done by wading or from a shallow-draft boat. Bonefishing is mostly done for sport, so the fish caught is released, but it may also be eaten in less developed areas.

The bonefish is notoriously wary, and great skill must be taken both in approach and presentation when fishing for them. English-speaking fishermen often refer to them as "grey ghosts".

=== As food ===
A typical Bahamian recipe is a split fish seasoned with pepper sauce and salt, then baked.

== See also ==
- Atlantic tarpon
- Ladyfish
- Milkfish
- Flats fishing
