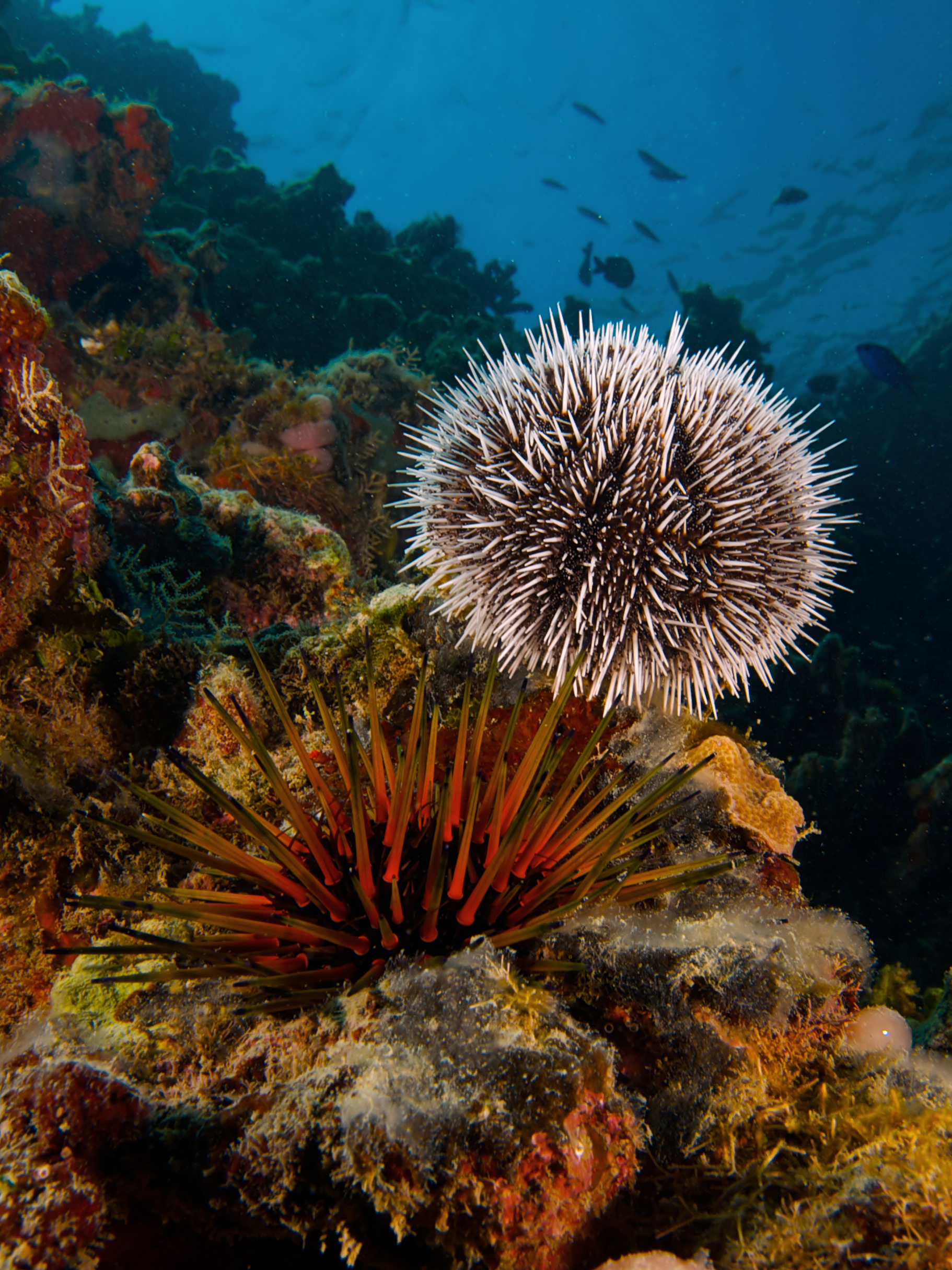
- Two species of sea urchins, the Echinometra viridis (bottom left) and Tripneustes ventricosus (top right).

Scientific classification
- Kingdom: Animalia
- Phylum: Echinodermata
- Subphylum: Echinozoa
- Class: Echinoidea; Leske, 1778

Subclasses
- Subclass Perischoechinoidea; Order Cidaroida (pencil urchins); Subclass Euechinoidea; Superorder Atelostomata; Order Cassiduloida; Order Spatangoida (heart urchins); Superorder Diadematacea; Order Diadematoida; Order Echinothurioida; Order Pedinoida; Superorder Echinacea; Order Arbacioida; Order Echinoida; Order Camarodonta; Order Phymosomatoida; Order Salenioida; Order Temnopleuroida; Superorder Gnathostomata; Order Clypeasteroida (sand dollars); Order Holectypoida

Diversity
- ~900 species

= Sea urchin =

Sea urchin Temporal range: Ordovician–Present

Class of marine invertebrates

Sea urchins or urchins (/ˈɜːrtʃɪnz/) are the class Echinoidea within the echinoderms. Approximately 950 species live on the seabed, inhabiting all oceans and depths from the intertidal zone to the deep sea. They typically have a globular body covered by spiny protective tests (hard shells), typically from 3 to 10 cm (1 to 4 in) across. Sea urchins move slowly, crawling with their tube feet, and sometimes pushing themselves with their spines. They feed primarily on algae but also eat slow-moving or sessile animals such as crinoids and sponges. Their predators include sharks, sea otters, starfish, wolf eels, triggerfish, and humans. When unchecked by predators, urchins can create urchin barrens, damaged environments devoid of large algae and the animals associated with them.

Like all echinoderms, adult sea urchins have pentagonal symmetry with their pluteus larvae featuring bilateral (mirror) symmetry; The latter indicates that they belong to the Bilateria, along with chordates, arthropods, annelids and molluscs. Sea urchins are found in every ocean and in every climate, from the tropics to the polar regions, and inhabit marine benthic (sea bed) habitats, from rocky shores to hadal zone depths. The fossil record of the echinoids dates from the Ordovician period, some 450 million years ago. The closest echinoderm relatives of the sea urchin are the sea cucumbers (Holothuroidea), which like them are deuterostomes, a clade that includes the chordates.

The animals have been studied since the 19th century as model organisms in developmental biology, as their embryos were easy to observe. That has continued with studies of their genomes because of their unusual fivefold symmetry and relationship to chordates. Species such as the slate pencil urchin are popular in aquaria, where they are useful for controlling algae. Fossil urchins have been used as protective amulets.

== Diversity ==
Sea urchins are members of the phylum Echinodermata, which also includes starfish, sea cucumbers, sand dollars, brittle stars, and crinoids. Like other echinoderms, they have five-fold symmetry (called pentamerism) and move by means of hundreds of tiny, transparent, adhesive "tube feet". The symmetry is not obvious in the living animal, but is easily visible in the dried test.

Specifically, the term "sea urchin" refers to the "regular echinoids", which are symmetrical and globular, and includes several different taxonomic groups, with two subclasses: Euechinoidea ("modern" sea urchins, including irregular ones) and Cidaroidea, or "slate-pencil urchins", which have very thick, blunt spines, with algae and sponges growing on them. The "irregular" sea urchins are an infra-class inside the Euechinoidea, called Irregularia, and include Atelostomata and Neognathostomata. Irregular echinoids include flattened sand dollars, sea biscuits, and heart urchins.

Together with sea cucumbers (Holothuroidea), they make up the subphylum Echinozoa, which is characterized by a globoid shape without arms or projecting rays. Sea cucumbers and the irregular echinoids have secondarily evolved diverse shapes. Although many sea cucumbers have branched tentacles surrounding their oral openings, these have originated from modified tube feet and are not homologous to the arms of the crinoids, sea stars, and brittle stars.

Representatives of the major groups of sea urchins

Paracentrotus lividus, a regular sea urchin (Euechinoidea, infraclass Carinacea)

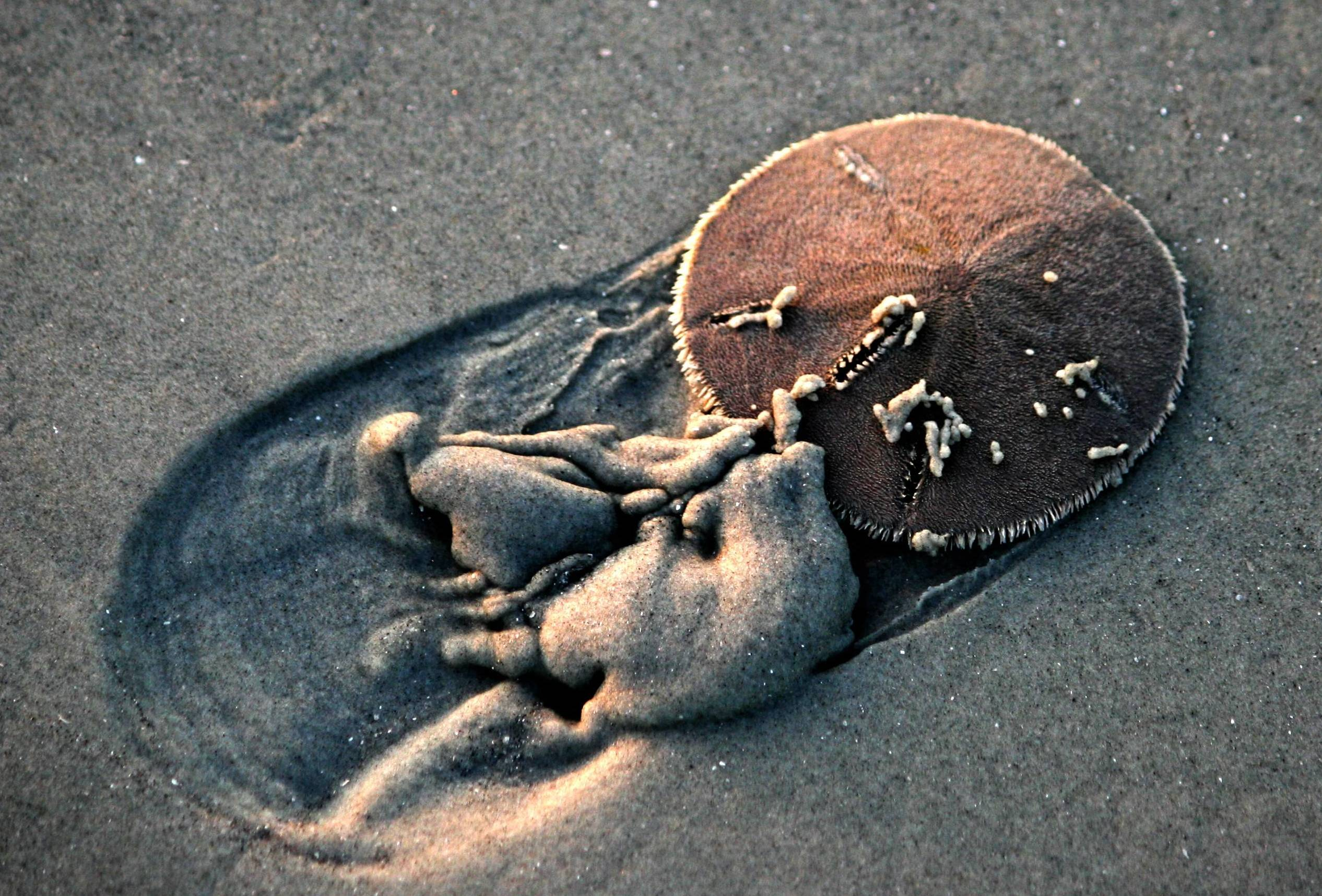
A sand dollar, an irregular sea urchin (Irregularia)

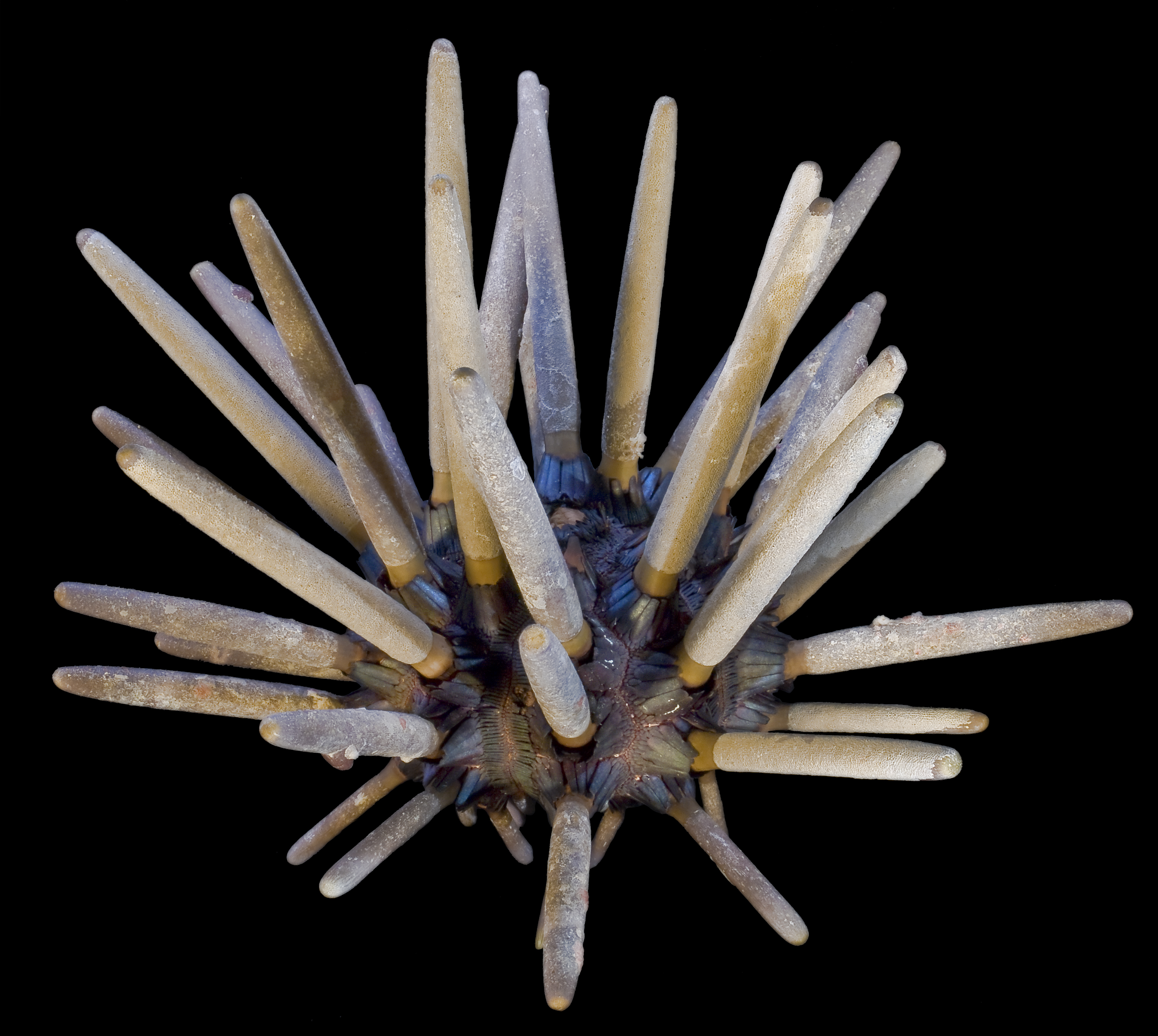
Phyllacanthus imperialis, a cidaroid sea urchin (Cidaroidea)

== Description ==
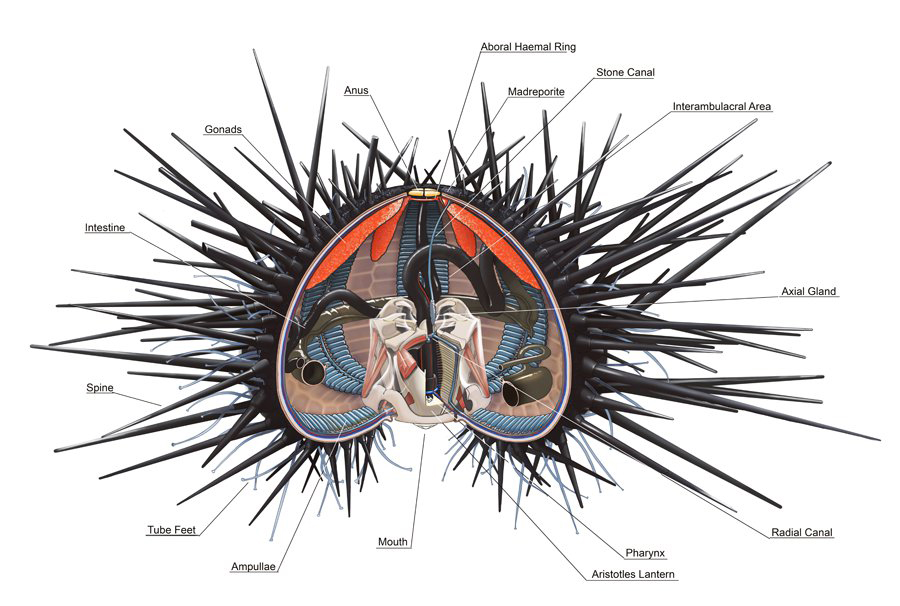
Sea urchin anatomy based on Arbacia sp.

Urchins typically range in size from 3 to 10 cm (1 to 4 in), but the largest species can reach up to 36 cm (14 in). They have a rigid, usually spherical body bearing moveable spines, which give the class the name Echinoidea (from the Greek ἐχῖνος ekhinos 'spine'). The name urchin is an old word for hedgehog, which sea urchins resemble; they have archaically been called sea hedgehogs. The name is derived from the Old French herichun, from Latin ericius ('hedgehog').

Like other echinoderms, sea urchin early larvae have bilateral symmetry, but they develop five-fold symmetry as they mature. This is most apparent in the "regular" sea urchins, which have roughly spherical bodies with five equally sized parts radiating out from their central axes. The mouth is at the base of the animal and the anus at the top; the lower surface is described as "oral" and the upper surface as "aboral". (Note: The tube feet are present in all parts of the animal except around the anus, so technically, the whole surface of the body should be considered to be the oral surface, with the aboral (non-mouth) surface limited to the immediate vicinity of the anus.)

Several sea urchins, however, including the sand dollars, are oval in shape, with distinct front and rear ends, giving them a degree of bilateral symmetry. In these urchins, the upper surface of the body is slightly domed, but the underside is flat, while the sides are devoid of tube feet. This "irregular" body form has evolved to allow the animals to burrow through sand or other soft materials.

== Systems ==
=== Musculoskeletal ===
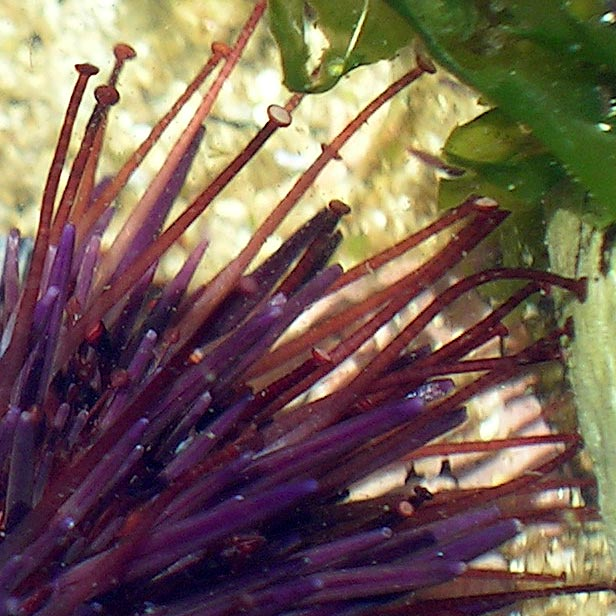
Tube feet of a purple sea urchin

The internal organs are enclosed in a hard shell or test composed of fused plates of calcium carbonate covered by a thin dermis and epidermis. The test is referred to as an endoskeleton rather than exoskeleton even though it encloses almost all of the urchin. This is because it is covered with a thin layer of muscle and skin; sea urchins also do not need to molt the way invertebrates with true exoskeletons do, instead the plates forming the test grow as the animal does.

The test is rigid, and divides into five ambulacral grooves separated by five wider interambulacral areas. Each of these ten longitudinal columns consists of two sets of plates (thus comprising 20 columns in total). The ambulacral plates have pairs of tiny holes through which the tube feet extend.

All of the plates are covered in rounded tubercles to which the spines are attached. The spines are used for defence and for locomotion and come in a variety of forms. The inner surface of the test is lined by peritoneum. Sea urchins convert aqueous carbon dioxide using a catalytic process involving nickel into the calcium carbonate portion of the test.

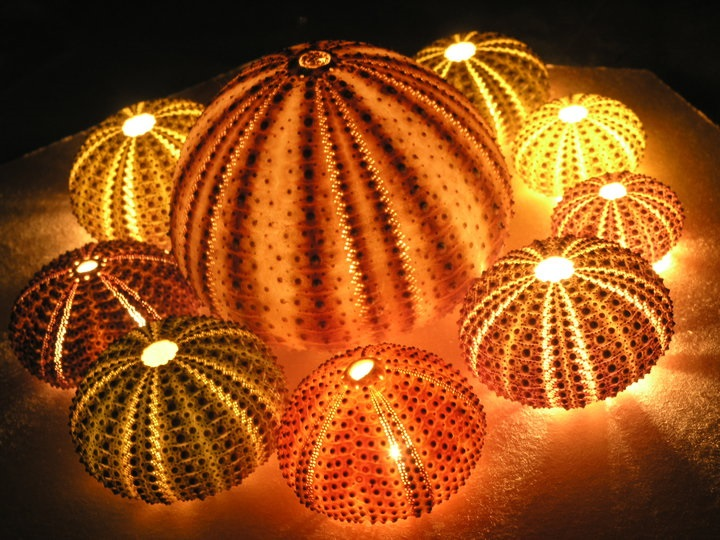
Mediterranean sea urchins illuminated to reveal the mesodermal calcite structure

Most species have two series of spines, primary (long) and secondary (short), distributed over the surface of the body, with the shortest at the poles and the longest at the equator. The spines are usually hollow and cylindrical. Contraction of the muscular sheath that covers the test causes the spines to lean in one direction or another, while an inner sheath of collagen fibres can reversibly change from soft to rigid which can lock the spine in one position. Located among the spines are several types of pedicellaria, moveable stalked structures with jaws.

Sea urchins move by walking, using their many flexible tube feet in a way similar to that of starfish; regular sea urchins do not have any favourite walking direction. The tube feet protrude through pairs of pores in the test, and are operated by a water vascular system; this works through hydraulic pressure, allowing the sea urchin to pump water into and out of the tube feet. During locomotion, the tube feet are assisted by the spines which can be used for pushing the body along or to lift the test off the substrate. Movement is generally related to feeding, with the red sea urchin (Mesocentrotus franciscanus) managing about 7.5 cm (3 in) a day when there is ample food, and up to 50 cm (20 in) a day where there is not. An inverted sea urchin can right itself by progressively attaching and detaching its tube feet and manipulating its spines to roll its body upright. Some species bury themselves in soft sediment using their spines, and Paracentrotus lividus uses its jaws to burrow into soft rocks.

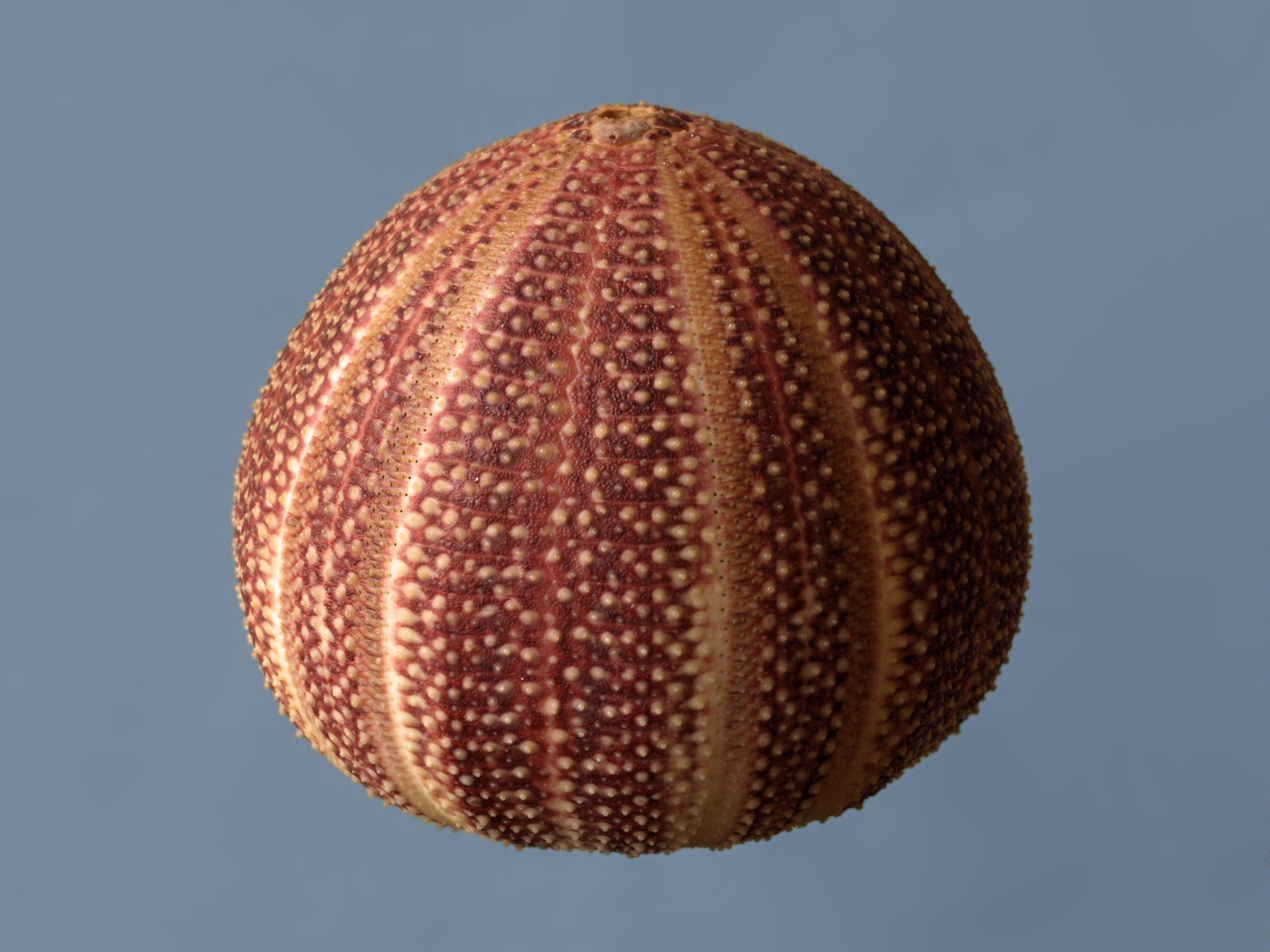
Test of an Echinus esculentus

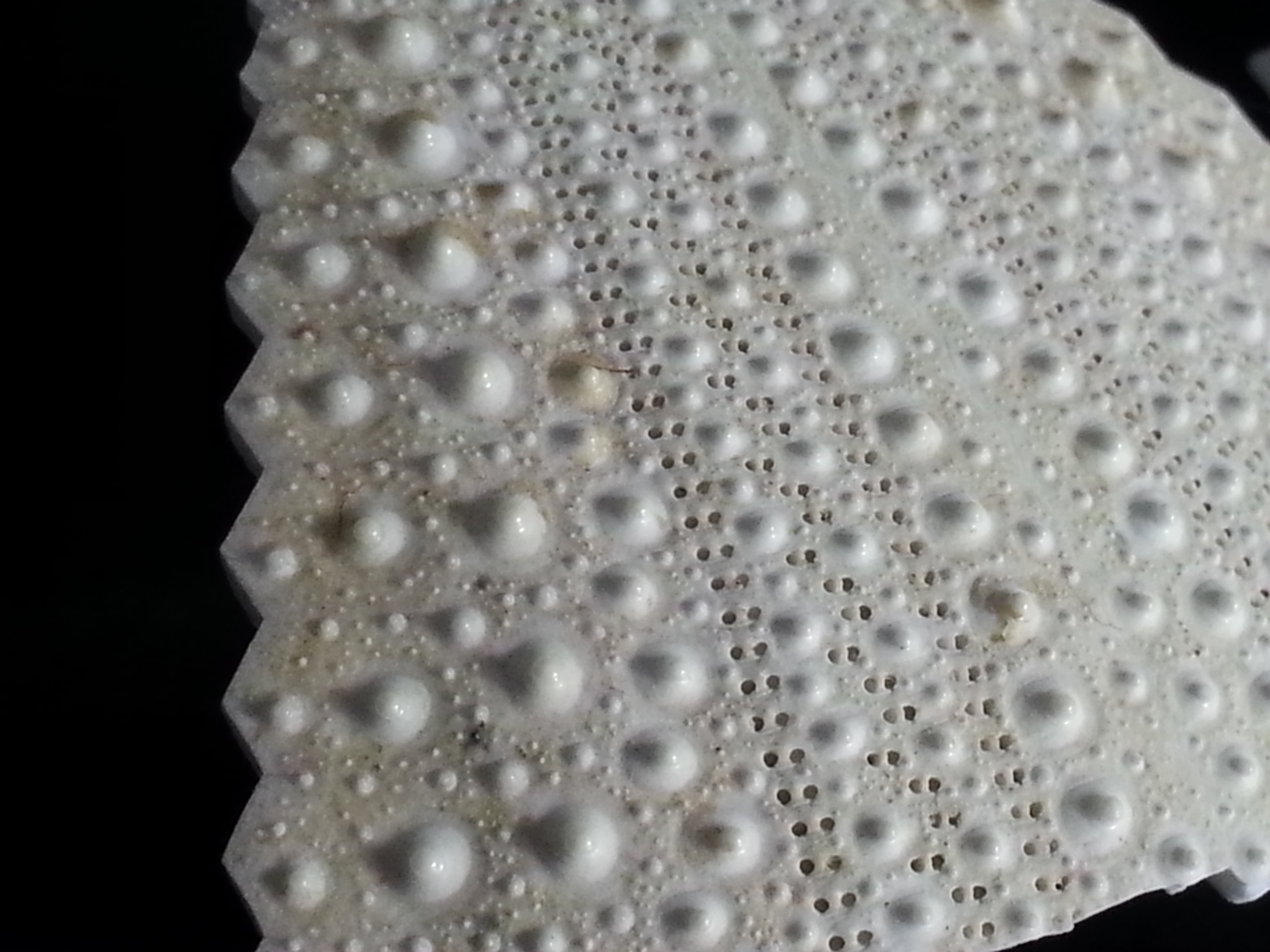
Close-up of test of Diadema antillarum, showing tubercles and ambulacral plates (on right)

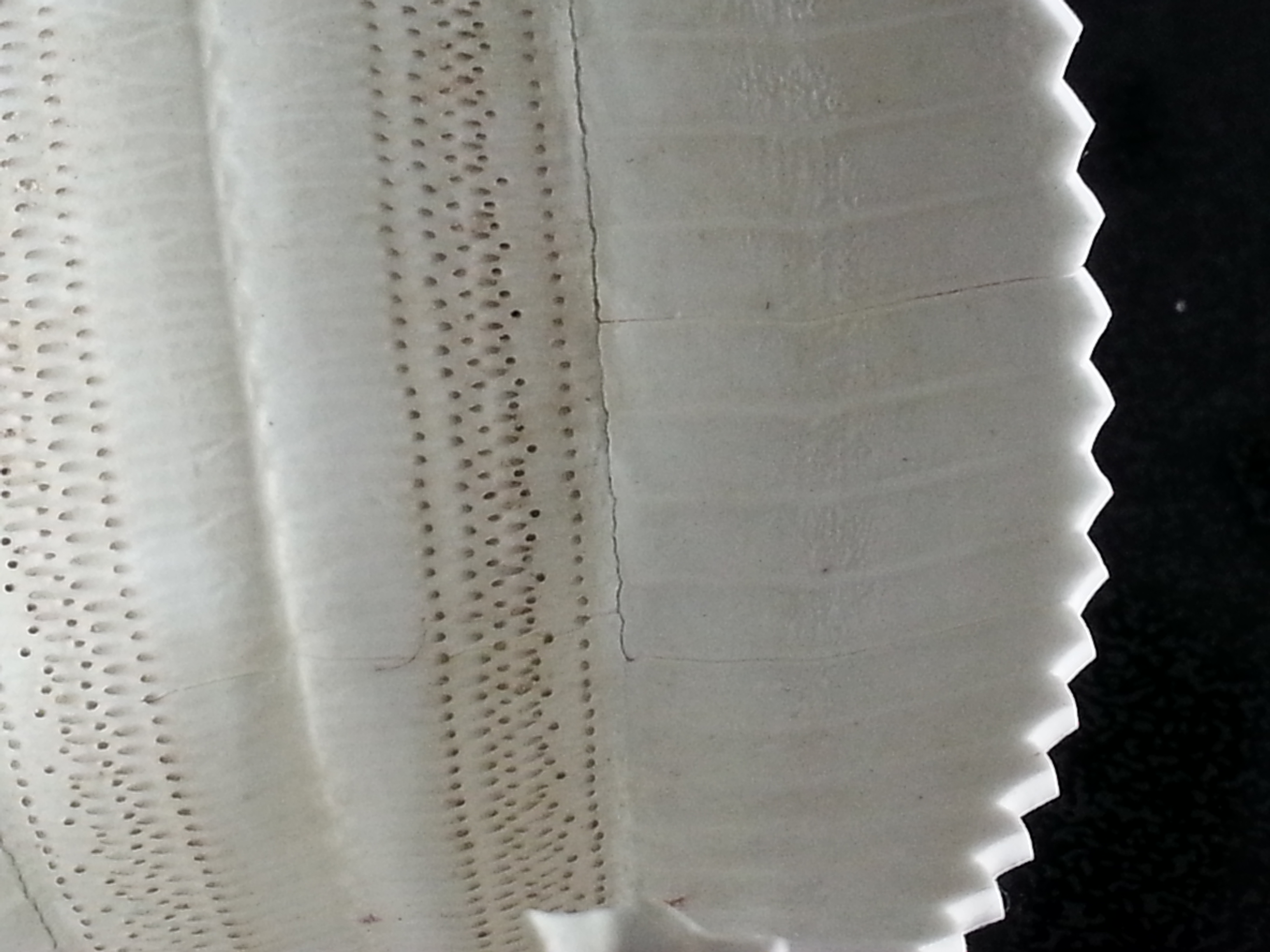
Inner surface of test of Diadema antillarum, showing pentagonal interambulacral plates on right, and holes for tube feet on left

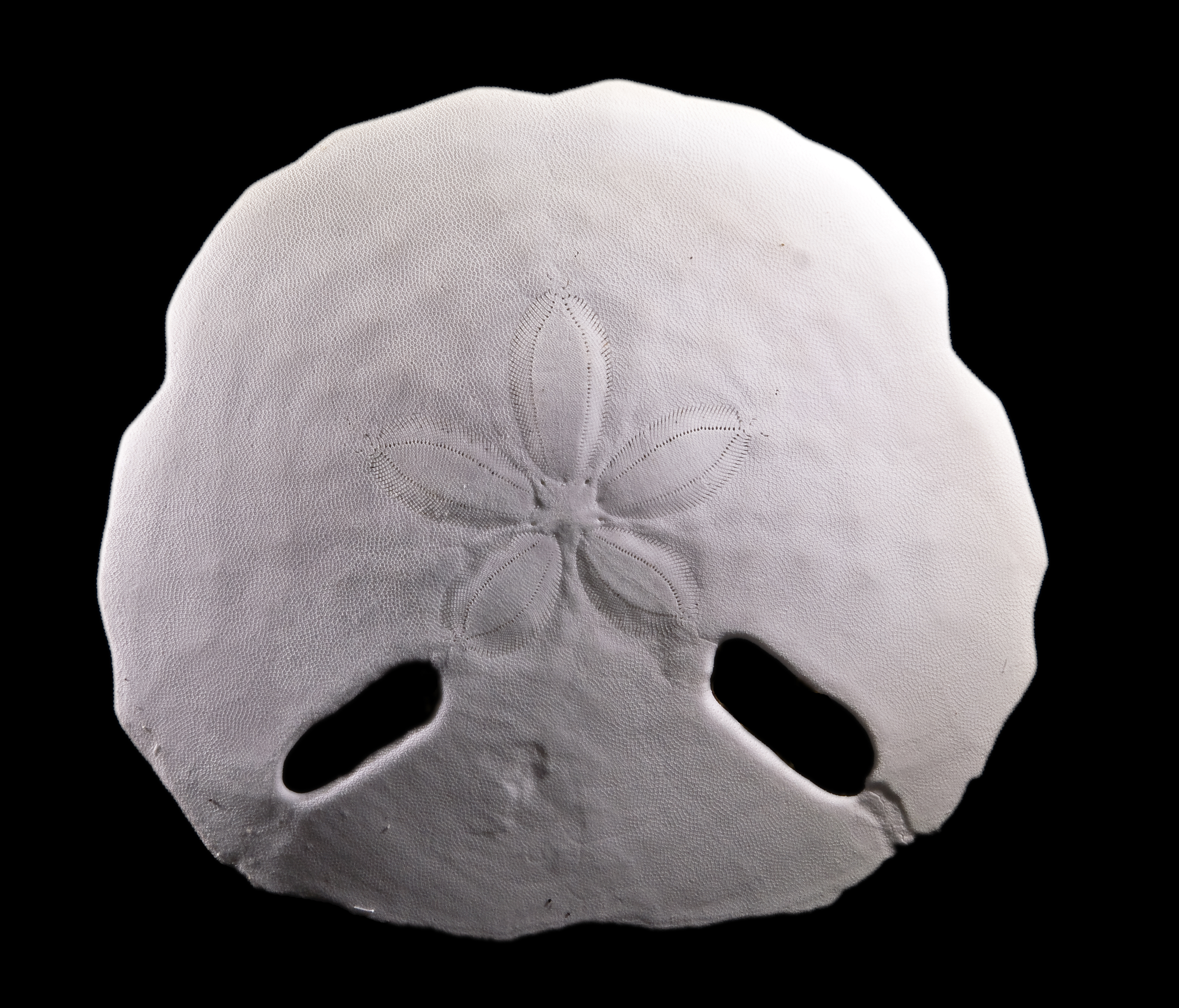
Test of Echinodiscus tenuissimus
("sand dollar")

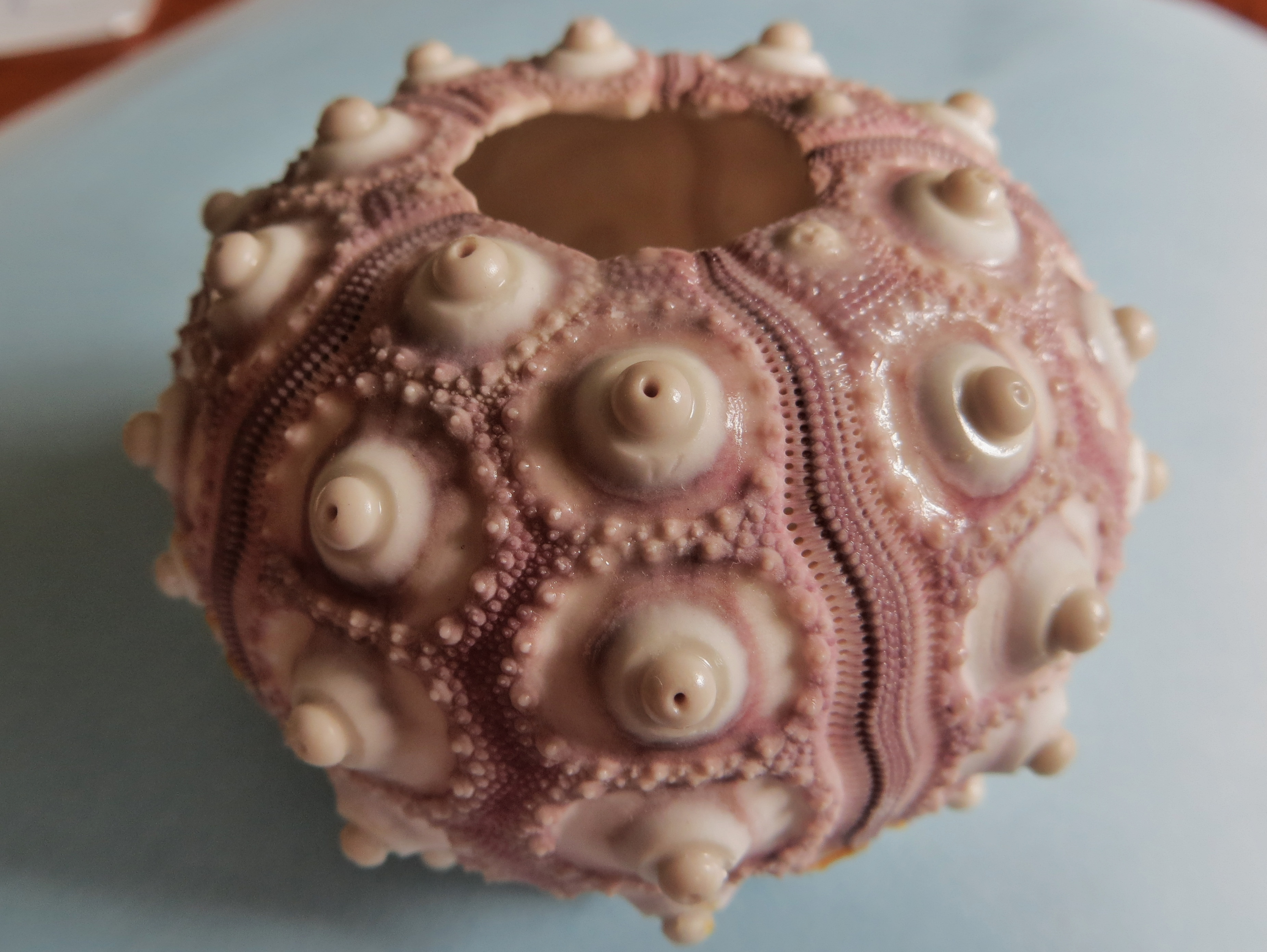
Test of a Phyllacanthus imperialis, these are characterised by their big tubercles, bearing large radiola

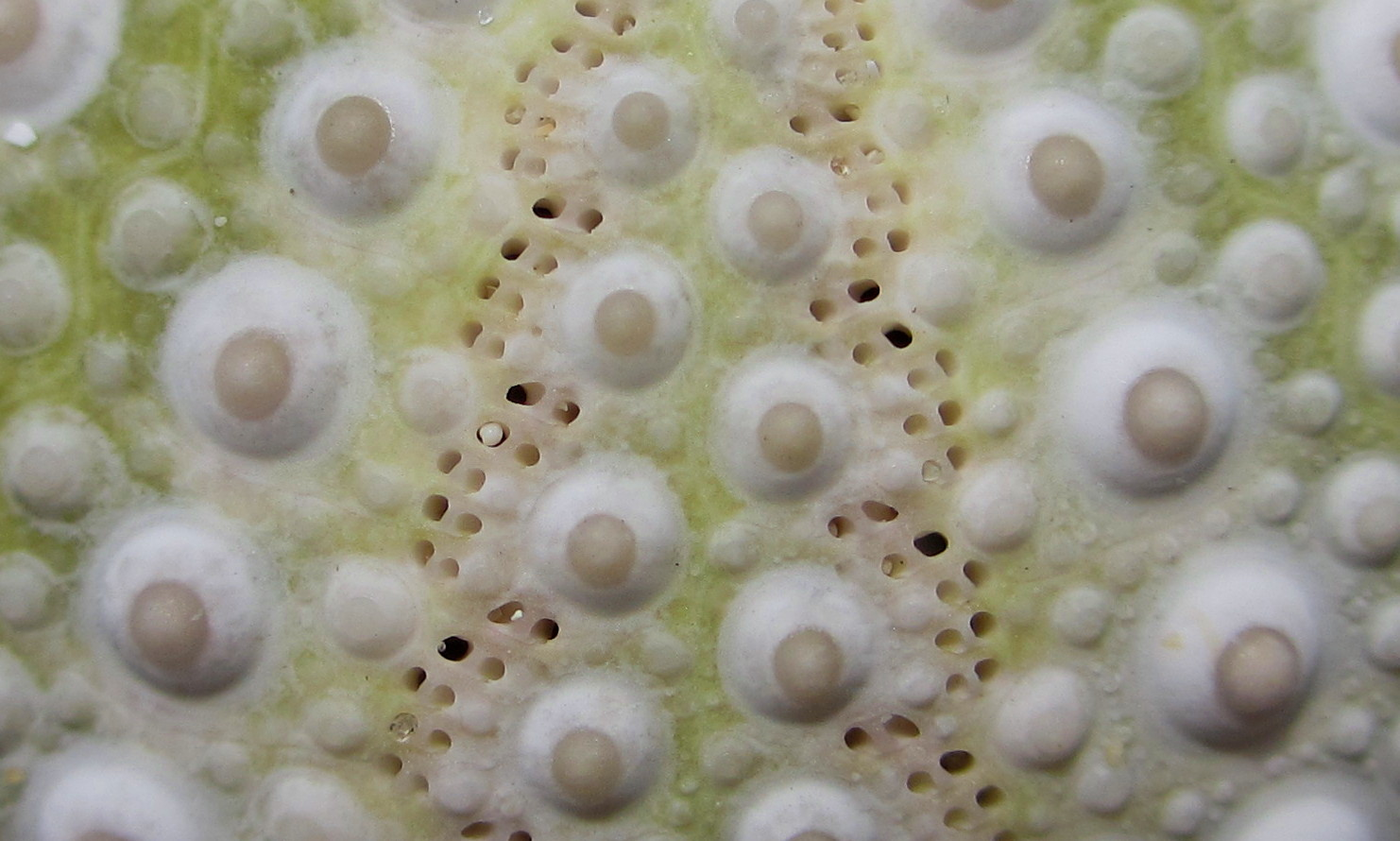
Close-up of test of Paracentrotus lividus, showing an ambulacral groove with its two rows of pore-pairs, between two interambulacra areas (green). The tubercles are non-perforated.

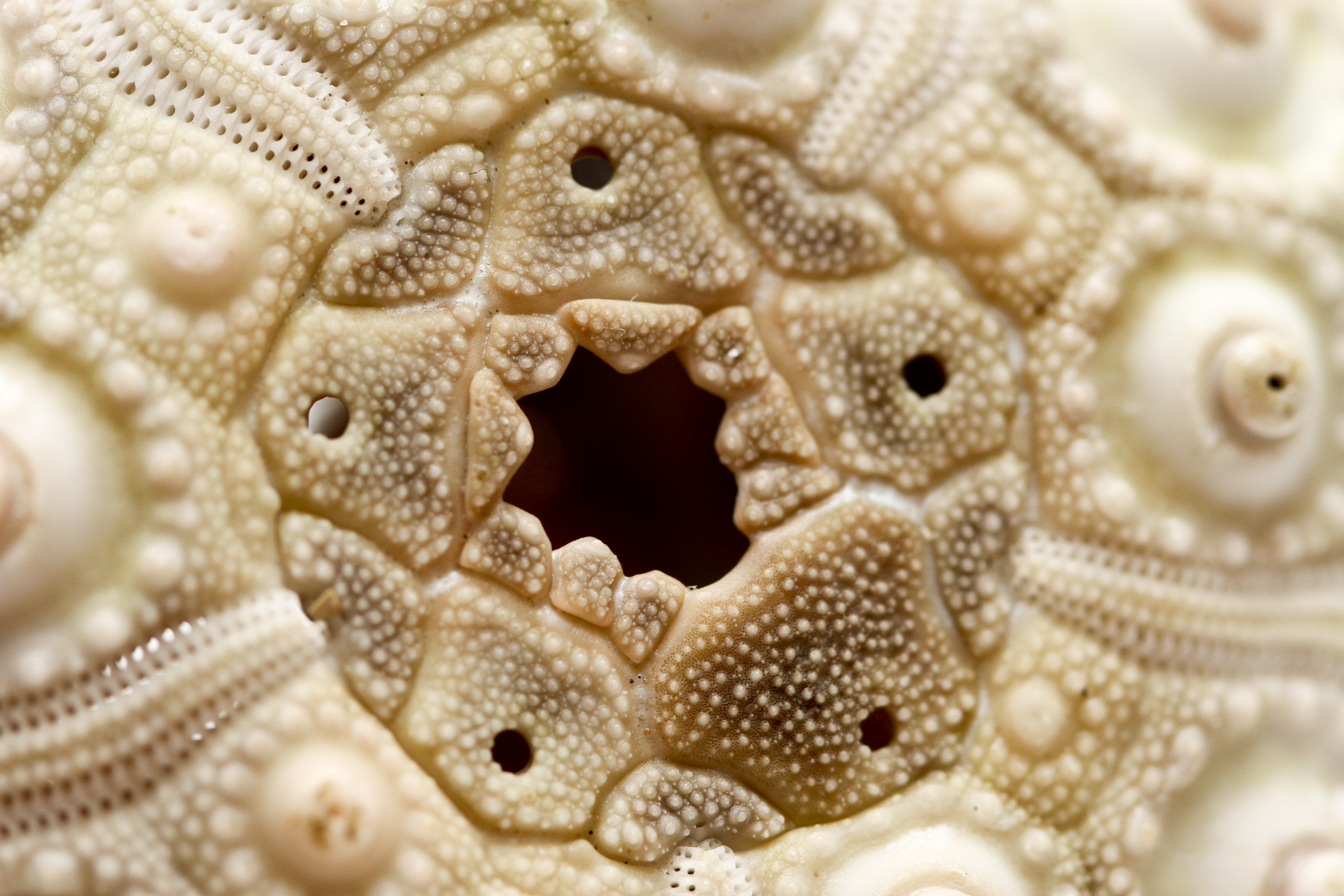
Close-up of a cidaroid sea urchin apical disc: the 5 holes are the gonopores, and the central one is the anus ("periproct"). The biggest genital plate is the madreporite

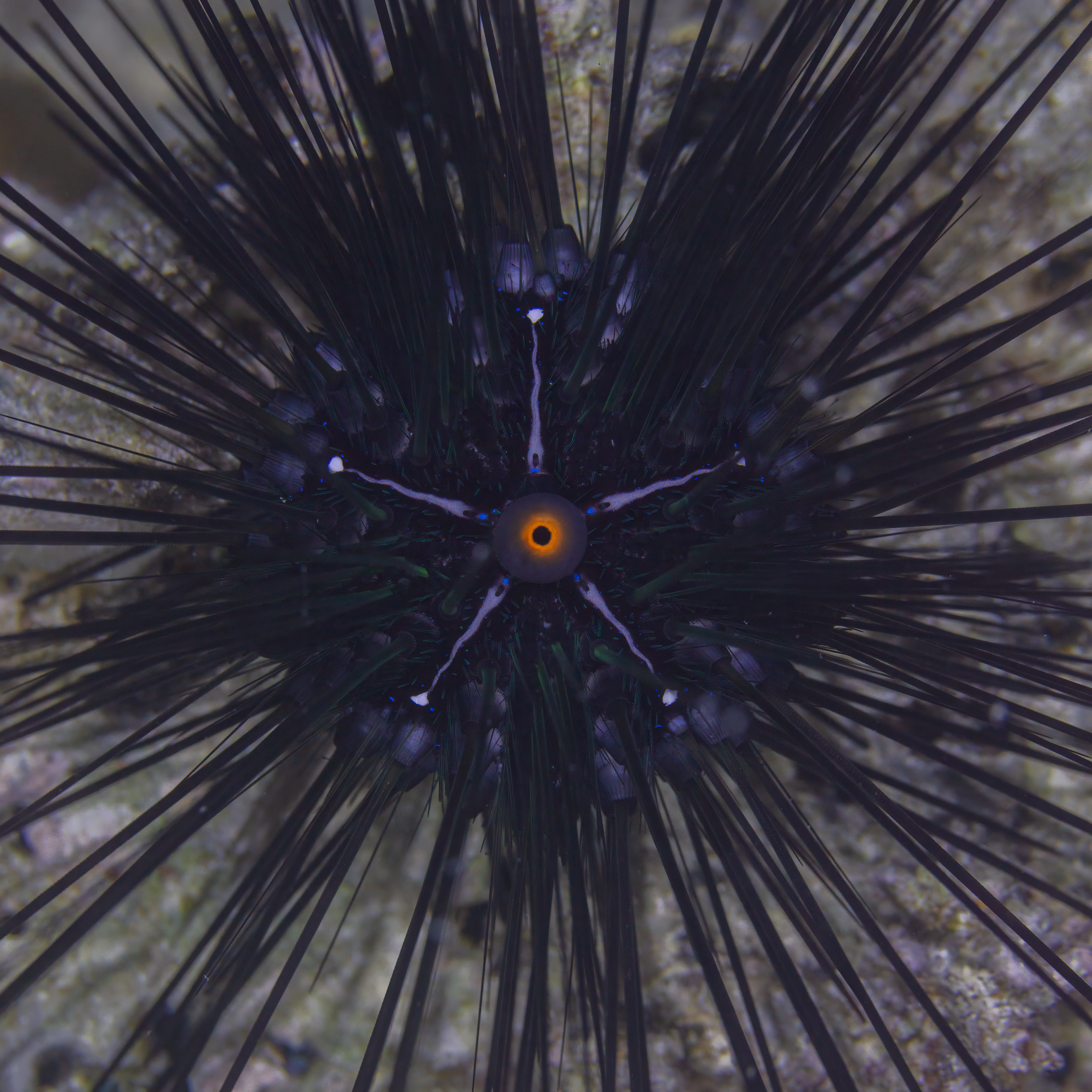
Periproct of Diadema setosum

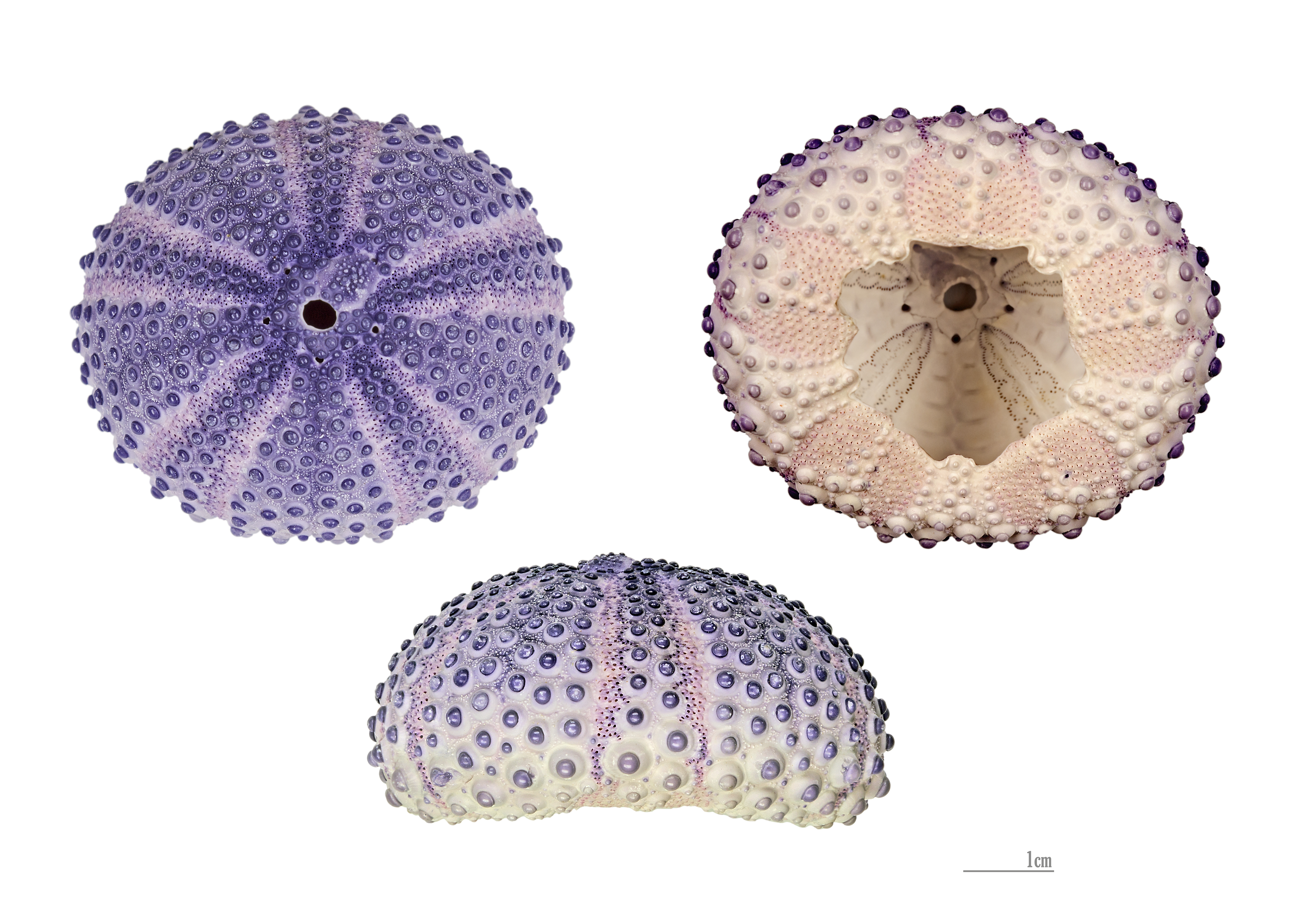
Multiple views of the test of Colobocentrotus atratus

=== Feeding and digestion ===
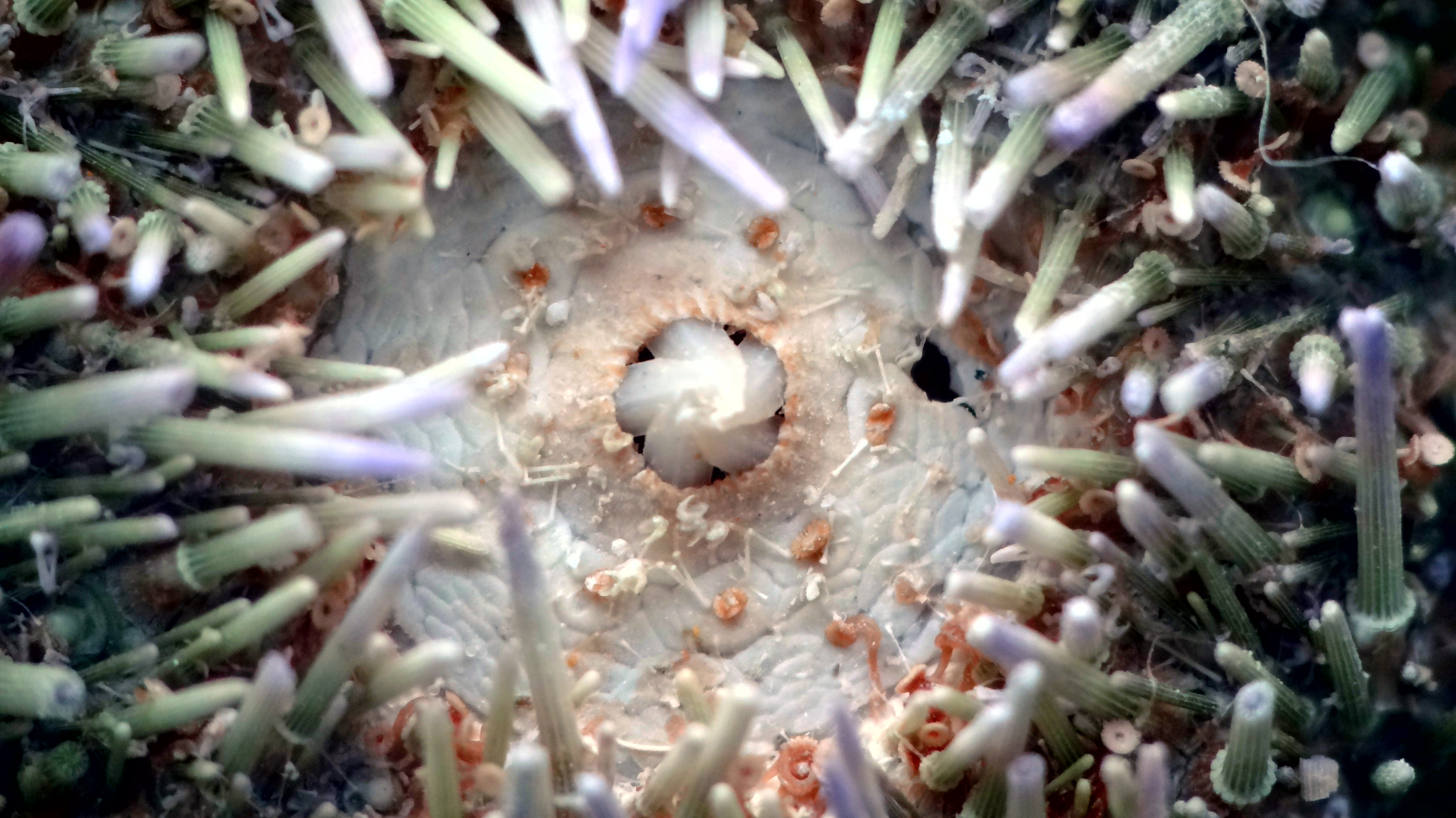
Dentition of a sea urchin

The mouth lies in the centre of the oral surface in regular urchins, or towards one end in irregular urchins. It is surrounded by lips of softer tissue, with numerous small, embedded bony pieces. This area, called the peristome, also includes five pairs of modified tube feet and, in many species, five pairs of gills. The jaw apparatus consists of five strong arrow-shaped plates known as pyramids, the ventral surface of each of which has a toothband with a hard tooth pointing towards the centre of the mouth. Specialised muscles control the protrusion of the apparatus and the action of the teeth, and the animal can grasp, scrape, pull and tear. The structure of the mouth and teeth have been found to be so efficient at grasping and grinding that similar structures have been tested for use in mechanical applications.

On the upper surface of the test at the aboral pole is a membrane, the periproct, which surrounds the anus. The periproct contains a variable number of hard plates, five of which, the genital plates, contain the gonopores, and one is modified to contain the madreporite, which is used to balance the water vascular system.

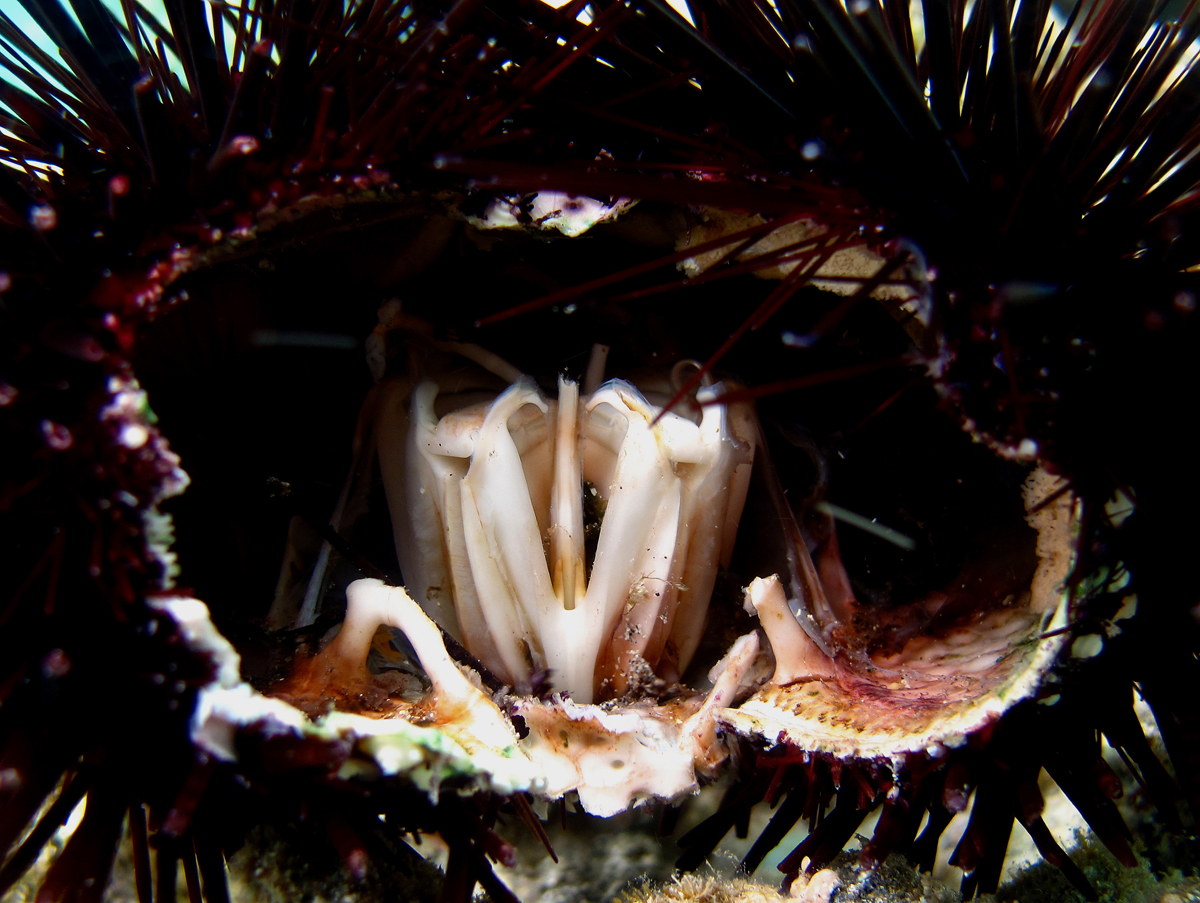
Aristotle's lantern in a sea urchin, viewed in lateral section

The mouth of most sea urchins is made up of five calcium carbonate teeth or plates, with a fleshy, tongue-like structure within. The entire chewing organ is known as Aristotle's lantern from Aristotle's description in his History of Animals (translated by D'Arcy Thompson):

... the urchin has what we mainly call its head and mouth down below, and a place for the issue of the residuum up above. The urchin has, also, five hollow teeth inside, and in the middle of these teeth a fleshy substance serving the office of a tongue. Next to this comes the esophagus, and then the stomach, divided into five parts, and filled with excretion, all the five parts uniting at the anal vent, where the shell is perforated for an outlet ... In reality the mouth-apparatus of the urchin is continuous from one end to the other, but to outward appearance it is not so, but looks like a horn lantern with the panes of horn left out.

However, this has recently been proven to be a mistranslation. Aristotle's lantern is actually referring to the whole shape of sea urchins, which look like the ancient lamps of Aristotle's time.

Heart urchins are unusual in not having a lantern. Instead, the mouth is surrounded by cilia that pull strings of mucus containing food particles towards a series of grooves around the mouth.

Digestive and circulatory systems of a regular sea urchin: a = anus; m = madreporite; s = aquifer canal; r = radial canal; p = podial ampulla; k = test wall; i = intestine; b = mouth

The lantern, where present, surrounds both the mouth cavity and the pharynx. At the top of the lantern, the pharynx opens into the esophagus, which runs back down the outside of the lantern, to join the small intestine and a single caecum. The small intestine runs in a full circle around the inside of the test, before joining the large intestine, which completes another circuit in the opposite direction. From the large intestine, a rectum ascends towards the anus. Despite the names, the small and large intestines of sea urchins are in no way homologous to the similarly named structures in vertebrates.

Digestion occurs in the intestine, with the caecum producing further digestive enzymes. An additional tube, called the siphon, runs beside much of the intestine, opening into it at both ends. It may be involved in resorption of water from food.

=== Circulation and respiration ===
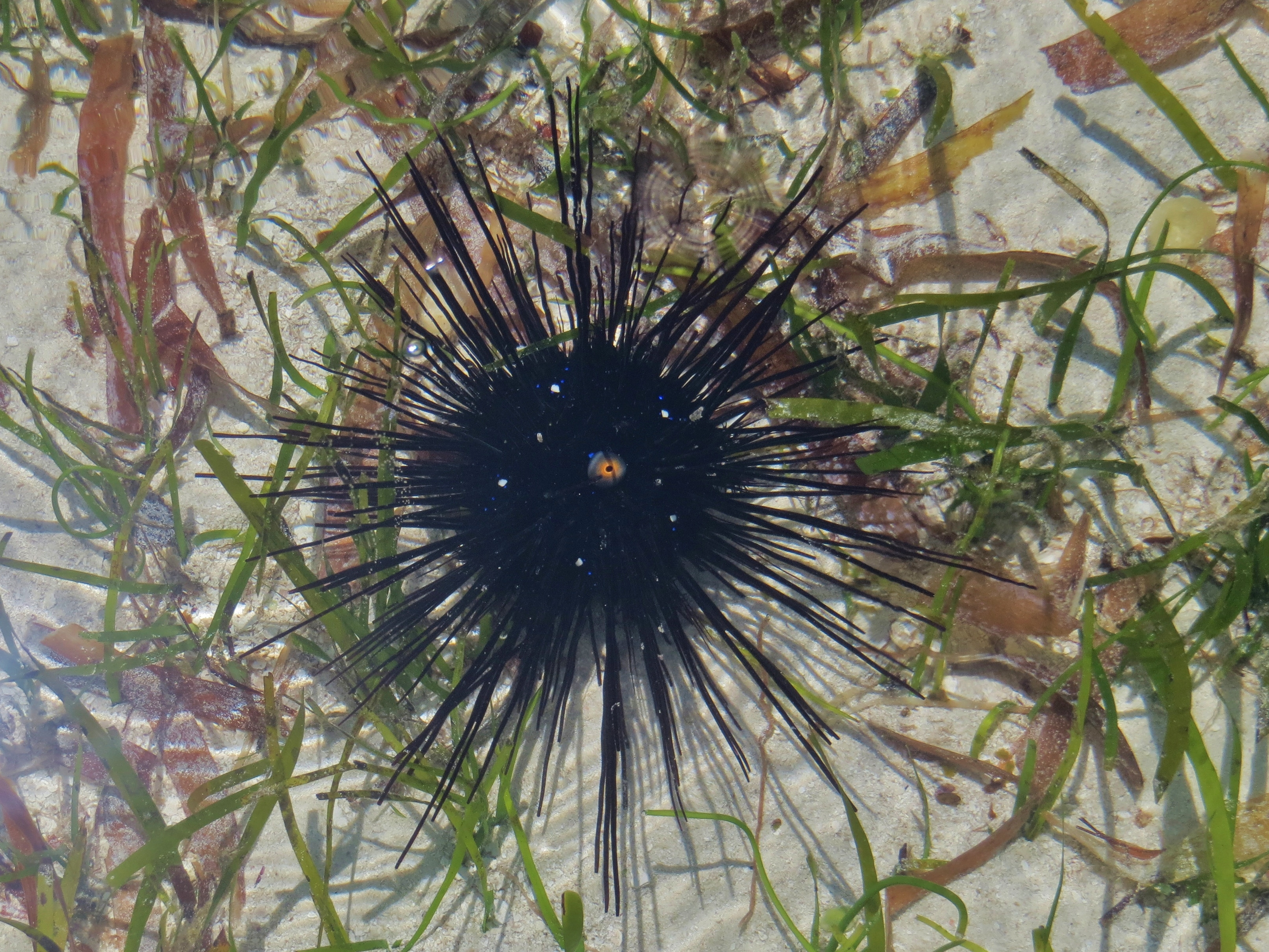
Diadema setosum

The water vascular system leads downwards from the madreporite through the slender stone canal to the ring canal, which encircles the oesophagus. Radial canals lead from here through each ambulacral area to terminate in a small tentacle that passes through the ambulacral plate near the aboral pole. Lateral canals lead from these radial canals, ending in ampullae. From here, two tubes pass through a pair of pores on the plate to terminate in the tube feet.

Sea urchins possess a hemal system with a complex network of vessels in the mesenteries around the gut, but little is known of the functioning of this system. However, the main circulatory fluid fills the general body cavity, or coelom. This coelomic fluid contains phagocytic coelomocytes, which move through the vascular and hemal systems and are involved in internal transport and gas exchange. The coelomocytes are an essential part of blood clotting, but also collect waste products and actively remove them from the body through the gills and tube feet.

Most sea urchins possess five pairs of external gills attached to the peristomial membrane around their mouths. These thin-walled projections of the body cavity are the main organs of respiration in those urchins that possess them. Fluid can be pumped through the gills' interiors by muscles associated with the lantern, but this does not provide a continuous flow, and occurs only when the animal is low in oxygen. Tube feet can also act as respiratory organs, and are the primary sites of gas exchange in heart urchins and sand dollars, both of which lack gills. The inside of each tube foot is divided by a septum which reduces diffusion between the incoming and outgoing streams of fluid.

=== Nervous system and senses ===
The nervous system of sea urchins has a relatively simple layout. With no true centralized brain, the neural center is a large nerve ring encircling the mouth just inside the lantern. From the nerve ring, five nerves radiate underneath the radial canals of the water vascular system, and branch into numerous finer nerves to innervate the tube feet, spines, and pedicellariae.

Sea urchins are sensitive to touch, light, and chemicals. There are numerous sensitive cells in the epithelium, especially in the spines, pedicellaria and tube feet, and around the mouth. Although they do not have eyes or eye spots (except for diadematids, which can follow a threat with their spines), the entire body of most regular sea urchins might function as a compound eye. In general, sea urchins are negatively attracted to light, and seek to hide themselves in crevices or under objects. Most species, apart from pencil urchins, have statocysts in globular organs called spheridia. These are stalked structures and are located within the ambulacral areas; their function is to help in gravitational orientation.

== Life history ==
=== Reproduction ===
Male rose flower urchin (Toxopneustes roseus) releasing milt, 1 November 2011, Lalo Cove, Sea of Cortez

Sea urchins are dioecious, having separate male and female sexes, although no distinguishing features are visible externally. In addition to their role in reproduction, the gonads are also nutrient storing organs, and are made up of two main type of cells: germ cells, and somatic cells called nutritive phagocytes. Regular sea urchins have five gonads, lying underneath the interambulacral regions of the test, while the irregular forms mostly have four, with the hindmost gonad being absent; heart urchins have three or two. Each gonad has a single duct rising from the upper pole to open at a gonopore lying in one of the genital plates surrounding the anus. Some burrowing sand dollars have an elongated papilla that enables the liberation of gametes above the surface of the sediment. The gonads are lined with muscles underneath the peritoneum, and these allow the animal to squeeze its gametes through the duct and into the surrounding sea water, where fertilization takes place.

=== Development ===
Sea urchin blastula

During early development, the sea urchin embryo undergoes 10 cycles of cell division, resulting in a single epithelial layer enveloping the blastocoel. The embryo then begins gastrulation, a multipart process which dramatically rearranges its structure by invagination to produce the three germ layers, involving an epithelial-mesenchymal transition; primary mesenchyme cells move into the blastocoel and become mesoderm. It has been suggested that epithelial polarity together with planar cell polarity might be sufficient to drive gastrulation in sea urchins.

An unusual feature of sea urchin development is the replacement of the larva's bilateral symmetry by the adult's broadly fivefold symmetry. During cleavage, mesoderm and small micromeres are specified. At the end of gastrulation, cells of these two types form coelomic pouches. In the larval stages, the adult rudiment grows from the left coelomic pouch; after metamorphosis, that rudiment grows to become the adult. The animal-vegetal axis is established before the egg is fertilized. The oral-aboral axis is specified early in cleavage, and the left-right axis appears at the late gastrula stage.

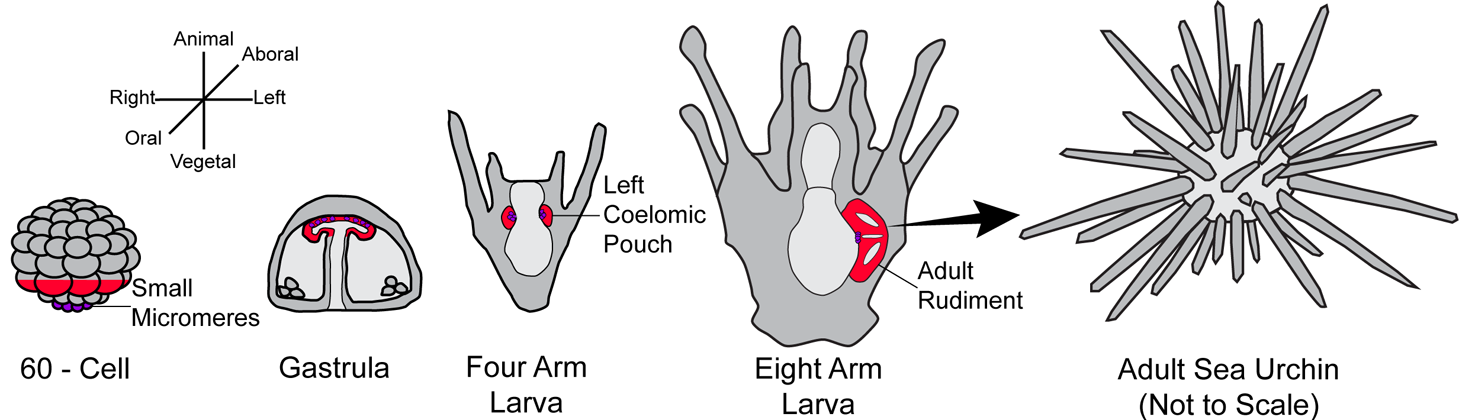
The development of a regular sea urchin

=== Life cycle and development ===
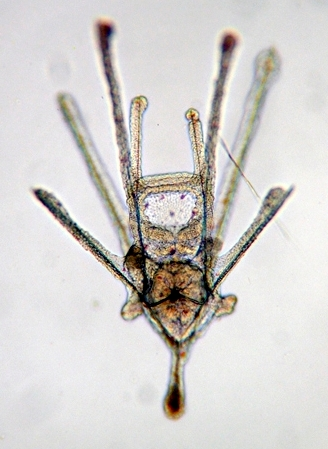
Pluteus larva has bilateral symmetry.

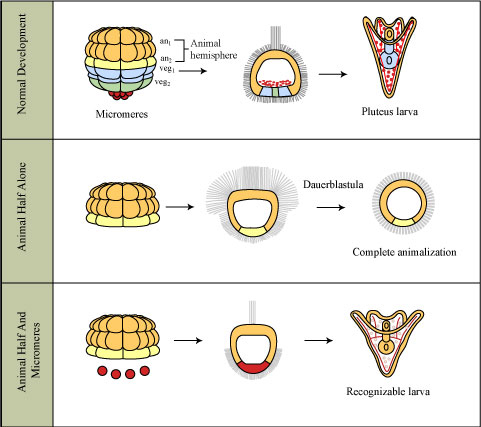
The animal half of an early sea urchin embryo does not form a normal pluteus larva, the micromeres can rescue development of the animal half. However, the micromeres contribute to only a few of the rescued embryos tissues.

In most cases, the female's eggs float freely in the sea, but some species hold onto them with their spines, affording them a greater degree of protection. The unfertilized egg meets with the free-floating sperm released by males, and develops into a free-swimming blastula embryo in as few as 12 hours. Initially a simple ball of cells, the blastula soon transforms into a cone-shaped echinopluteus larva. In most species, this larva has 12 elongated arms lined with bands of cilia that capture food particles and transport them to the mouth. In a few species, the blastula contains supplies of nutrient yolk and lacks arms, since it has no need to feed.

Several months are needed for the larva to complete its development, the change into the adult form beginning with the formation of test plates in a juvenile rudiment which develops on the left side of the larva, its axis being perpendicular to that of the larva. Soon, the larva sinks to the bottom and metamorphoses into a juvenile urchin in as little as one hour. In some species, adults reach their maximum size in about five years. The purple sea urchin becomes sexually mature in two years and may live for twenty.

=== Longevity ===
Red sea urchins were originally thought to live 7 to 10 years but recent studies have shown that they can live for more than 100 years. Canadian red urchins have been found to be around 200 years old.

== Ecology ==
Sea urchins are established in most benthic habitats from the intertidal downwards, at an extremely wide range of depths. Many genera are found in only the abyssal zone, including many cidaroids, most of the genera in the Echinothuriidae family, and the "cactus urchins" Dermechinus. Some species, such as Cidaris abyssicola, can live at depths of several kilometres, and one of the deepest-living families is the Pourtalesiidae, strange bottle-shaped irregular sea urchins that live in only the hadal zone and have been collected as deep as 6,850 m (22,470 ft) beneath the surface in the Sunda Trench. Compared to other classes of echinoderms, sea urchins inhabit more shallow depths compared to brittle stars, starfish, and crinoids that remain abundant below 8,000 m (26,250 ft) and sea cucumbers which have been recorded from 10,687 m (35,100 ft).

Population densities vary by habitat, with more dense populations in barren areas as compared to kelp stands. Even in these kelp barrens, greatest densities are found in shallow water. Populations are generally found in deeper water if wave action is present. Densities decrease in winter when storms cause them to seek protection in cracks and around larger underwater structures. The shingle urchin (Colobocentrotus atratus), which lives on exposed shorelines, is particularly resistant to wave action. It is one of the few sea urchin that can survive many hours out of water.

Sea urchins can be found in all climates, from warm seas to polar oceans. The larvae of the polar sea urchin Sterechinus neumayeri have been found to use energy in metabolic processes twenty-five times more efficiently than do most other organisms. Despite their presence in nearly all the marine ecosystems, most species are found on temperate and tropical coasts, between the surface and some tens of meters deep, close to photosynthetic food sources.

Purple sea urchins at low tide in California. They dig a cavity in the rock to hide from predators during the day

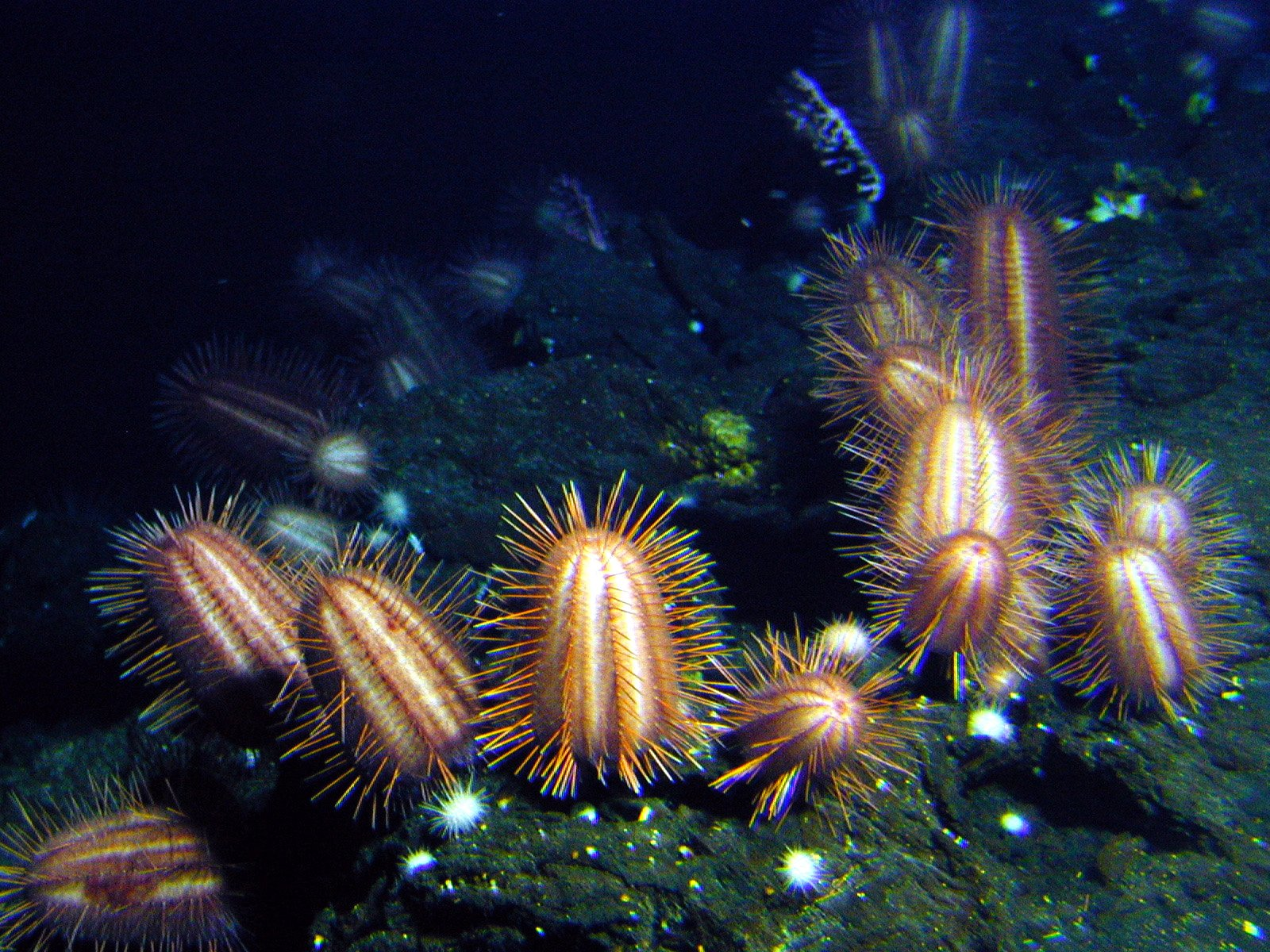
Dermechinus horridus, an abyssal species, at thousands of meters deep

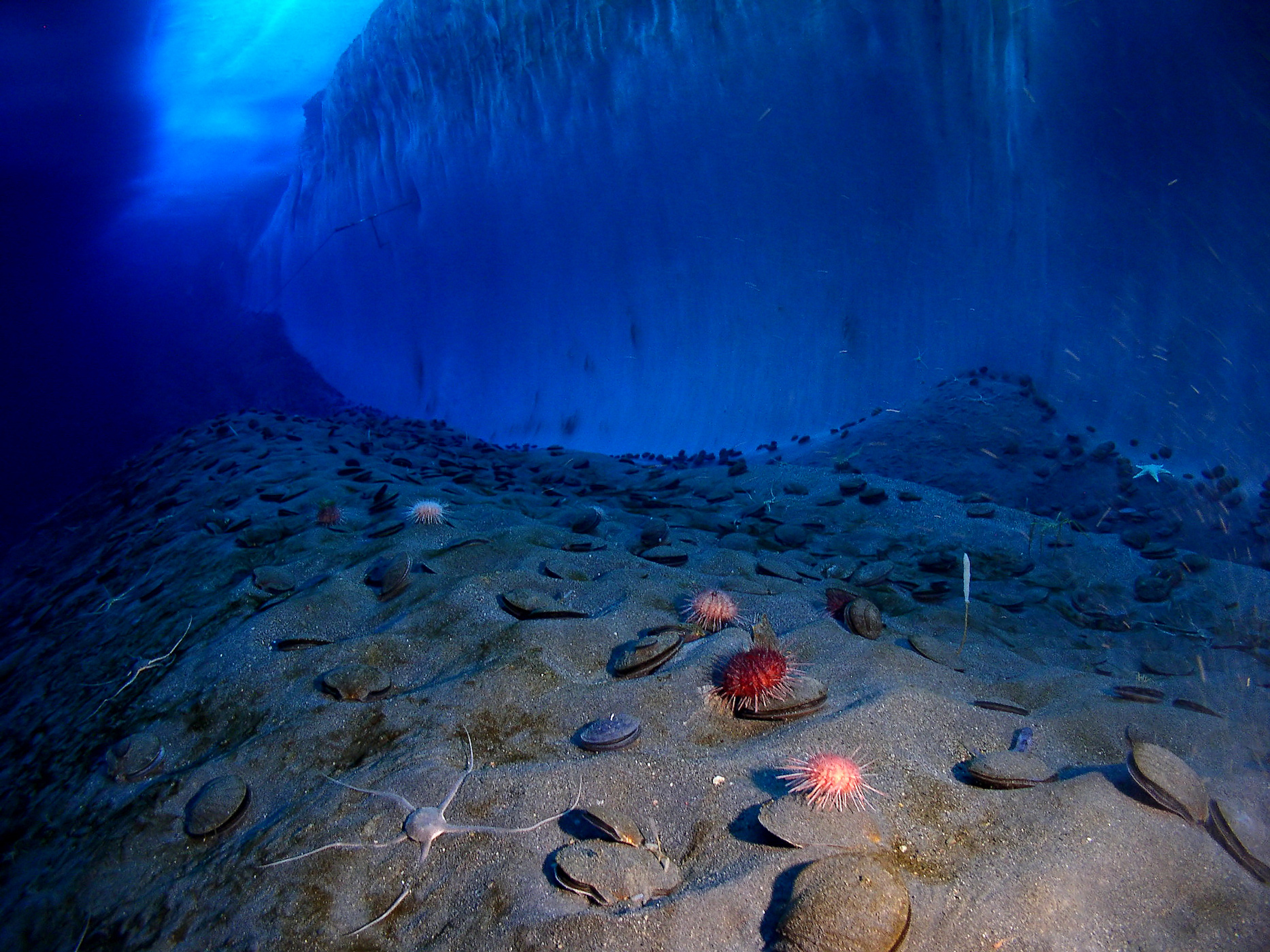
Antarctic sea urchin (Sterechinus neumayeri) inhabits frozen seas

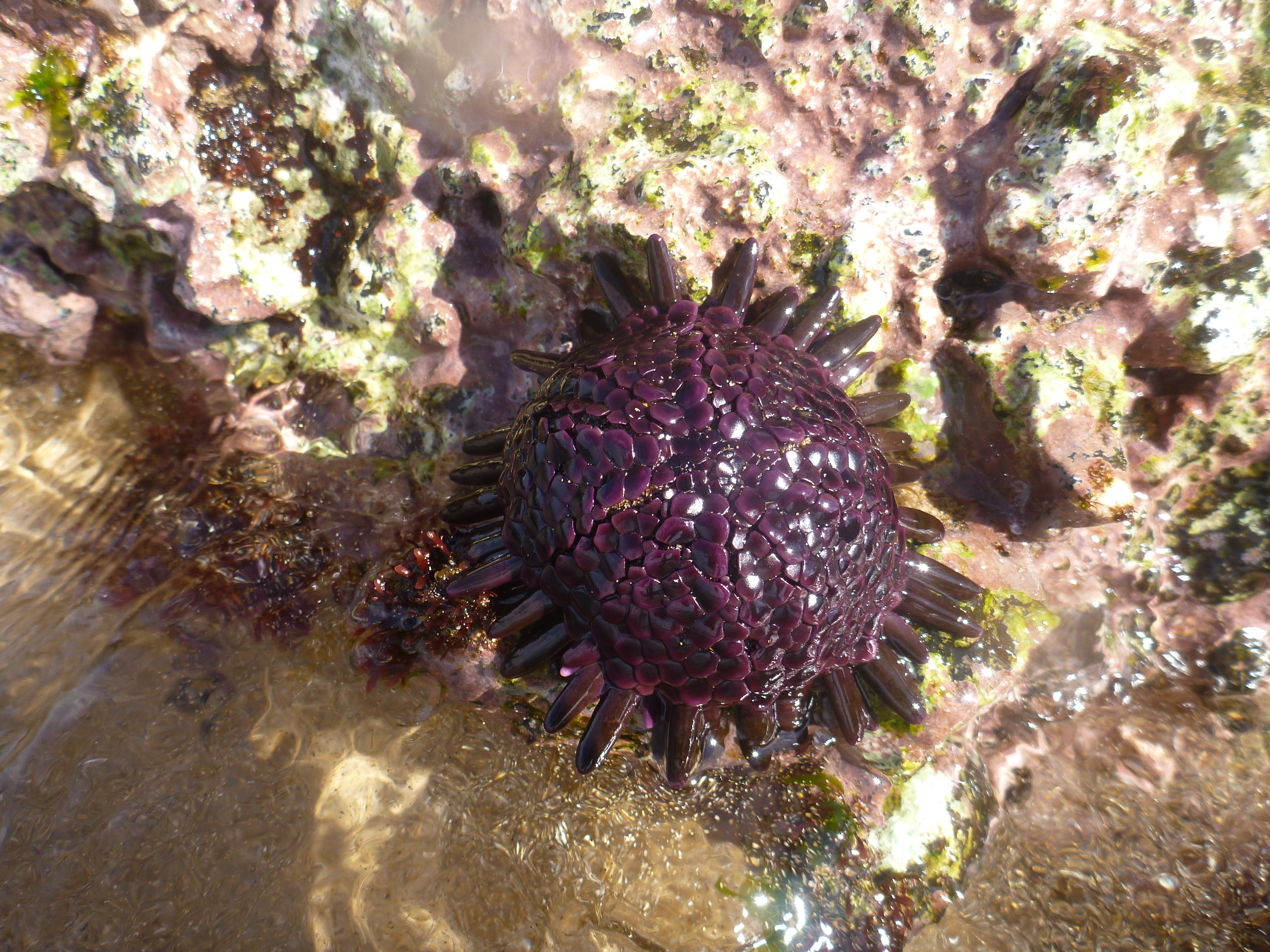
The shape of the shingle urchin allows it to stay on wave-beaten cliffs

=== Trophic ecology ===
Sea urchins feed mainly on algae, so they are primarily herbivores, but can feed on sea cucumbers and a wide range of invertebrates, such as mussels, polychaetes, sponges, brittle stars, and crinoids, making them omnivores, consumers at a range of trophic levels.

Adult sea urchins are usually well protected against most predators by their strong and sharp spines, which can be venomous in some species. The small urchin clingfish lives among the spines of urchins such as Diadema; juveniles feed on the pedicellariae and sphaeridia, adult males choose the tube feet and adult females move away to feed on shrimp eggs and molluscs.

Sea urchins are preyed upon by a number of marine animals, including lobsters, crabs, triggerfish, California sheephead, sea otters. Wolf eels are considered specialist predators of sea urchins. These predators have evolved adaptations - such as specialized teeth, pincers, or claws, along with sufficient physical strength that allows them to overcome the sea urchin's protective spines and shell.

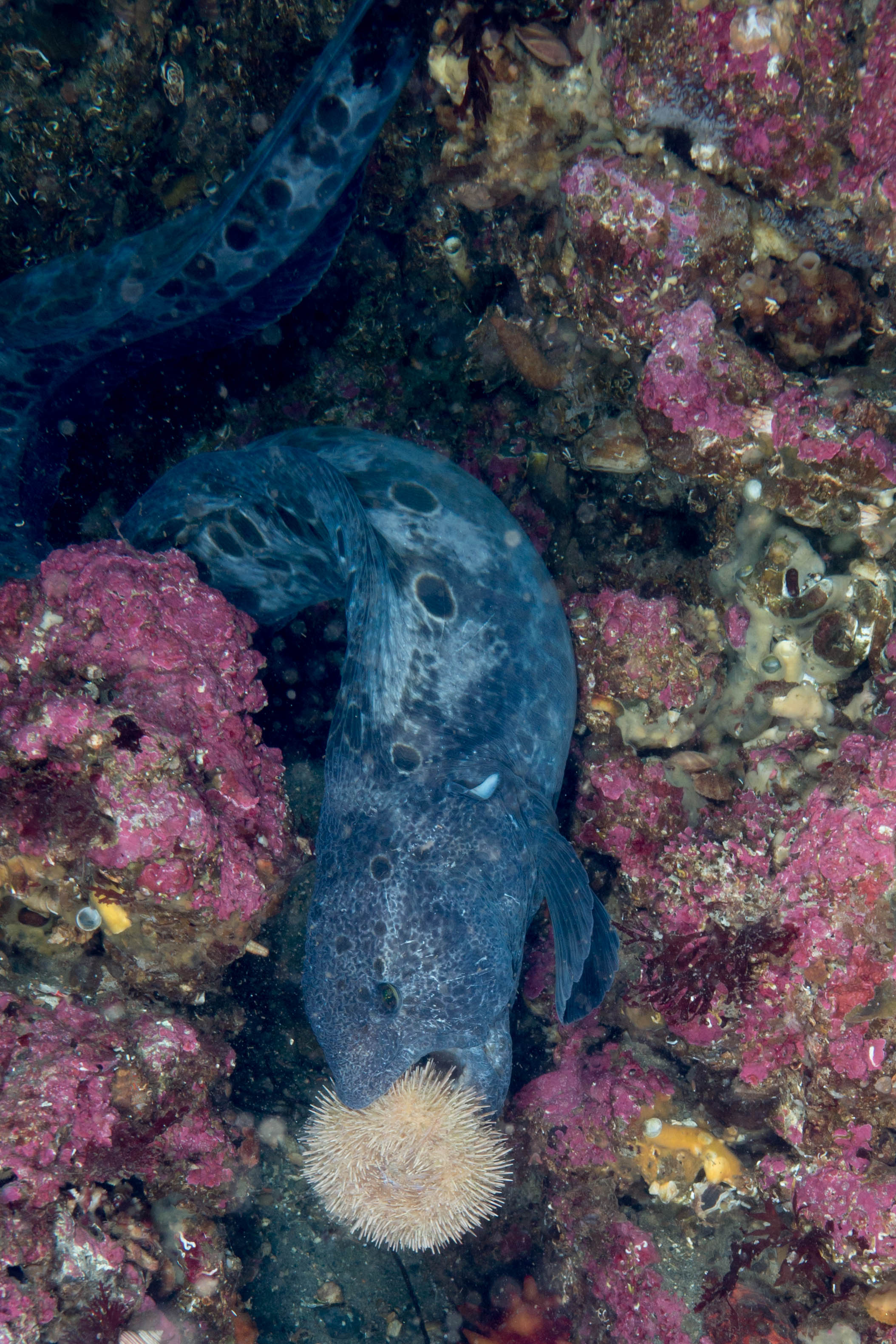
Wolf eels specialize in eating sea urchins

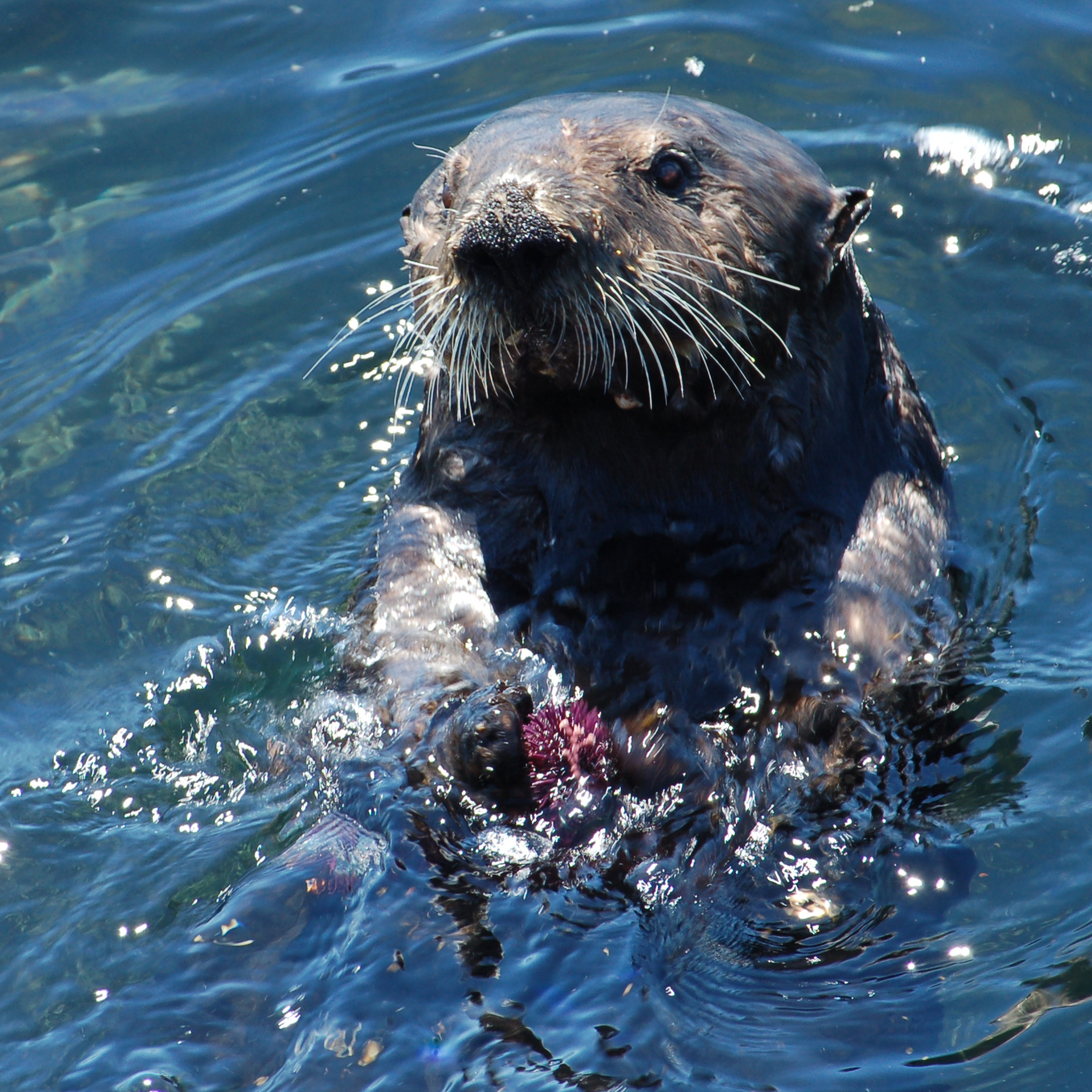
A sea otter feeding on a purple sea urchin

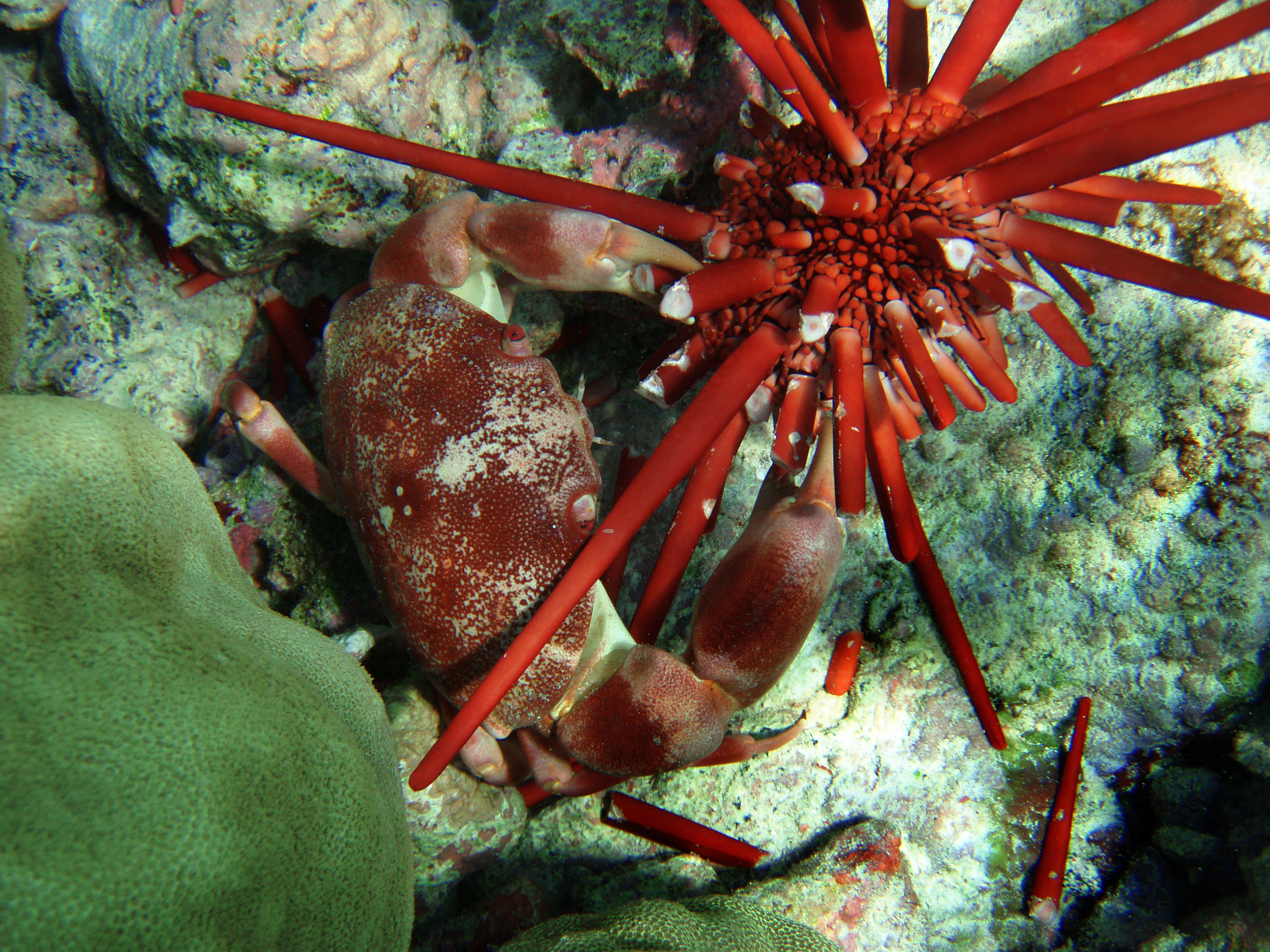
A marbled stone crab attacking a slate pencil sea urchin

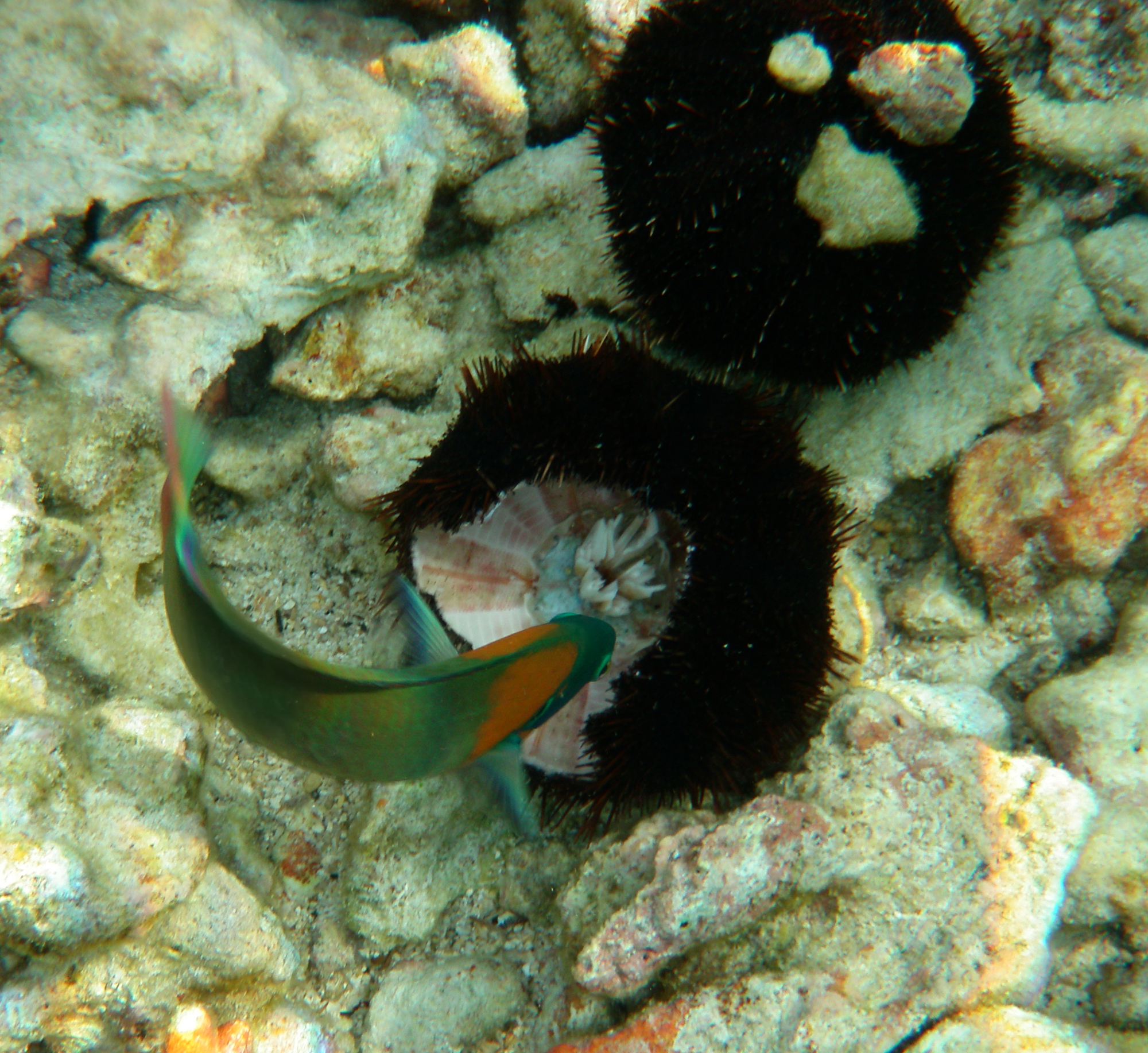
A saddle wrasse finishing the remains of a damaged collector urchin

=== Anti-predator defences ===
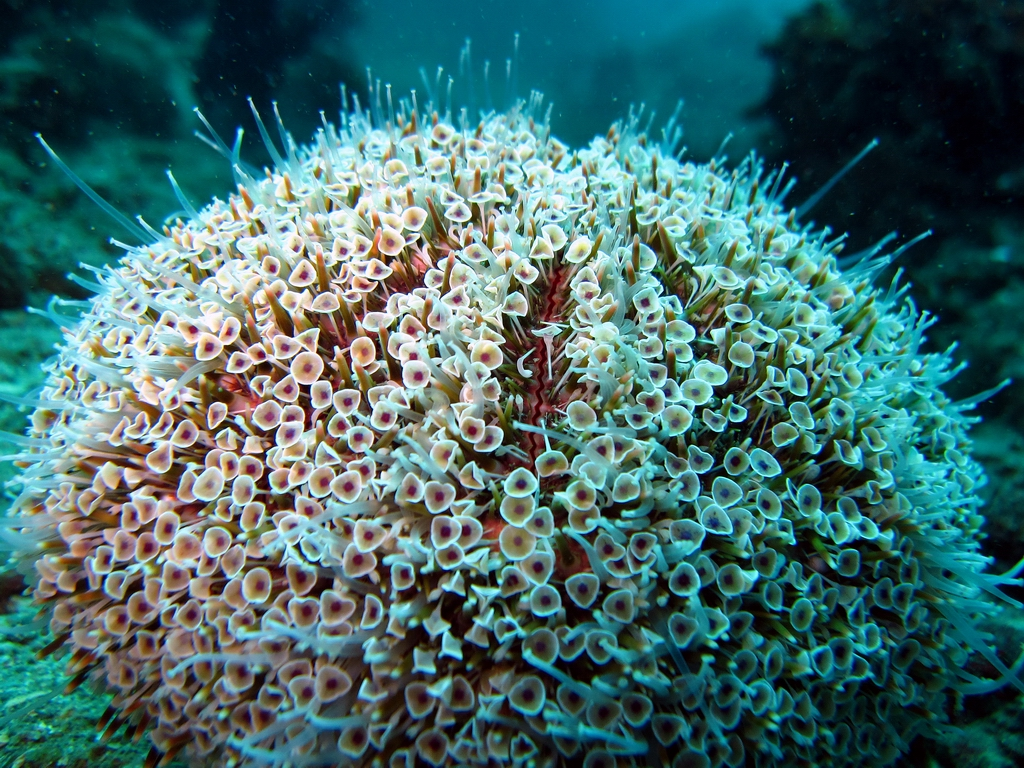
The flower urchin is potentially lethal venomous species.

The spines, long and sharp in some species, protect the urchin from predators. Some tropical sea urchins, like Diadematidae, Echinothuriidae and Toxopneustidae, have venomous spines. Other creatures also make use of these defences; crabs, shrimps and other organisms shelter among the spines, and often adopt the colouring of their host. Some crabs in the Dorippidae family carry sea urchins, starfish, sharp shells or other protective objects in their claws.

Pedicellariae are a good means of defense against ectoparasites, but not a panacea as some of them actually feed on it. The hemal system defends against endoparasites.

=== Urchin barrens ===
Left unchecked by predators, urchins devastate their environments, creating what biologists call an urchin barren, devoid of macroalgae and associated fauna. Sea urchins graze on the lower stems of kelp, causing the kelp to drift away and die. Loss of the habitat and nutrients provided by kelp forests leads to profound cascade effects on the marine ecosystem. The return of predators such as sea otters may reverse this process, promoting kelp regrowth and dramatically improving coastal ecosystem health.

The shift to urchin barrens may be better characterized as a "compositional redistribution", where change is observed in the species present in certain locales of a region, but the species extirpated in these locales remain present in other parts of the region. Compared to urchin barrens, kelp forests deliver more ecosystem services, such as biodiversity, species richness, abalone abundance, and sea urchin roe quality.

Urchin barrens replace kelp forests, thus they occur in places where kelp are native, such as off the coast of the contiguous United States, Canada, the Aleutians, Chile, Europe's Atlantic coastline, Greece, Australia, Japan, and the Russian Far East. The following are species of macroalgae that form the ecosystems replaced by urchin barrens:

- Agarum
- Alaria
- Cystoseira
- Desmarestia
- Eckionia
- Laminaria
- Lessonia
- Macrocystis
- Nereocystis
- Pterygophora
- Saccharina
- Sargassum
- Undaria

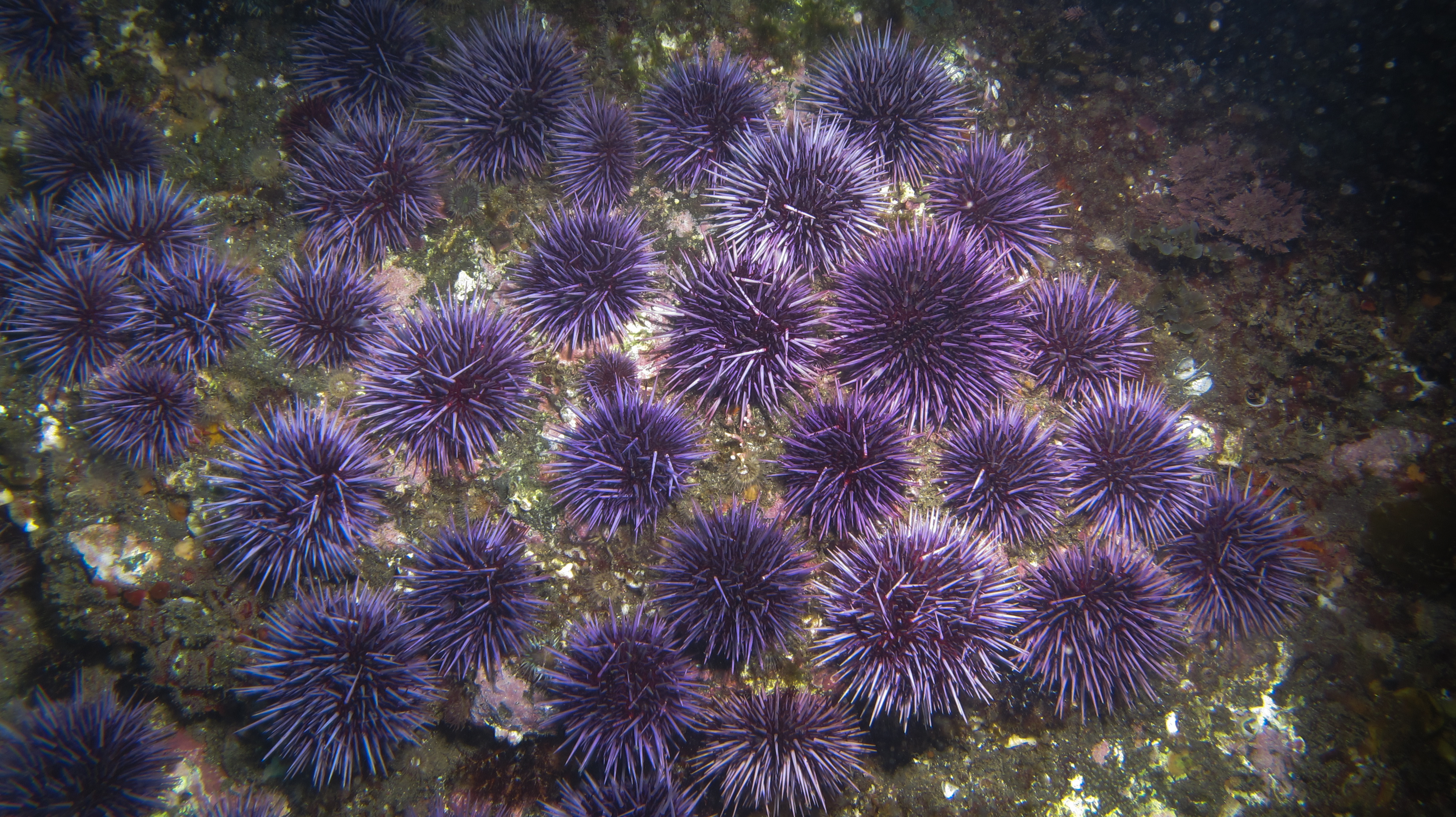
A dense "formation" of purple sea urchins (Strongylocentrotus purpuratus); Ventura, California. The impact of this species of sea urchin on Californian kelp forests are well publicized.

Contrary to what the name suggests, urchin barrens host invertebrates species other than sea urchins, such as sea stars, brittle stars, and mussels, along with coralline algae encrusting the substrate, which replace fleshy and filamentous algae. Regardless, these barrens are characterized by the dominance of sea urchins and coralline algae. The following are genera of sea urchins implicated with the establishment of urchin barrens:

- Arbacia
- Centrostephanus
- Diadema
- Evechinus
- Heliocidaris
- Loxechinus
- Paracentrotus
- Strongylocentrotus
- Tetrapygus

Some authors consider these urchin barrens to be an alternative stable state of the ecosystem; kelp forests may return to locales which were formerly urchin barrens due to certain events, such as a change in urchin density due to disease, shifting the balance over the threshold. The inverse is also true, and urchin barrens may replace kelp forests in these locales yet again, if ecological conditions shift (such as during El Niño–Southern Oscillation events).

Sea urchin mass mortality events may cause the rapid return of a kelp forest, as was observed in the Southern California Bight, where the ecosystem returned to a "kelp-dominated state" within 6 months of a disease outbreak. Targeted culling of sea urchins, where divers kill purple sea urchins with small hammers, may aid this process.

=== Disease ===
Mass mortality of sea urchins was first reported in the 1970s, but diseases in sea urchins had been little studied before the advent of aquaculture. In 1981, bacterial "spotting disease" caused almost complete mortality in juvenile Pseudocentrotus depressus and Hemicentrotus pulcherrimus, both cultivated in Japan; the disease recurred in succeeding years. It was divided into a cool-water "spring" disease and a hot-water "summer" form. Another condition, bald sea urchin disease, causes loss of spines and skin lesions and is believed to be bacterial in origin.

== Evolution ==
=== Fossil history ===
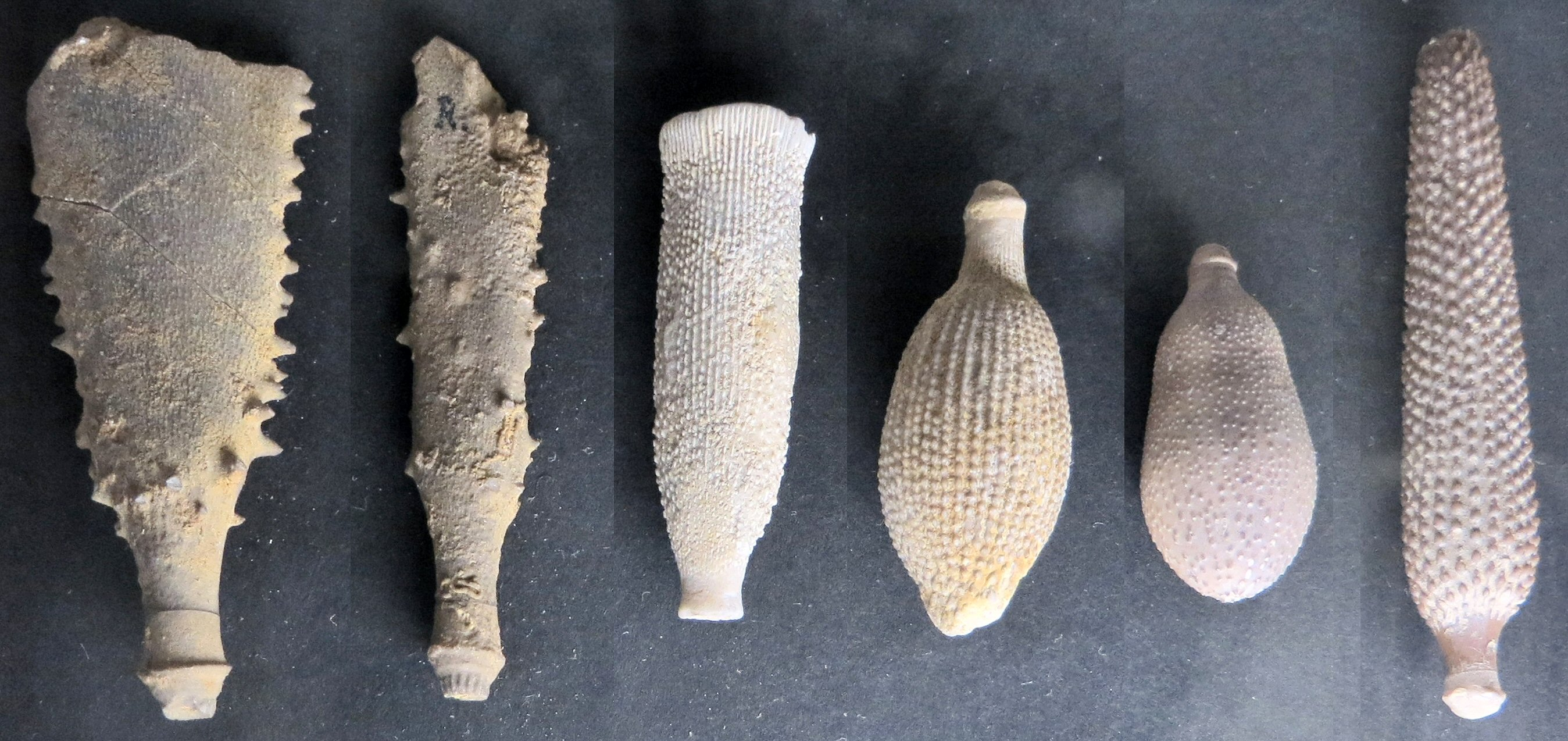
The thick spines (radiola) of Cidaridae were used for walking on the soft seabed.

The earliest echinoid fossils date to the Middle Ordovician period (circa 465 Mya). There is a rich fossil record, their hard tests made of calcite plates surviving in rocks from every period since then. Spines are present in some well-preserved specimens, but usually only the test remains. Isolated spines are common as fossils. Some Jurassic and Cretaceous Cidaroida had very heavy, club-shaped spines.

Most fossil echinoids from the Paleozoic era are incomplete, consisting of isolated spines and small clusters of scattered plates from crushed individuals, mostly in Devonian and Carboniferous rocks. The shallow-water limestones from the Ordovician and Silurian periods of Estonia are famous for echinoids. Paleozoic echinoids probably inhabited relatively quiet waters. Because of their thin tests, they would certainly not have survived in the wave-battered coastal waters inhabited by many modern echinoids. Echinoids declined to near extinction at the end of the Paleozoic era, with just six species known from the Permian period. Only two lineages survived this period's massive extinction and into the Triassic: the genus Miocidaris, which gave rise to modern cidaroida (pencil urchins), and the ancestor that gave rise to the euechinoids. By the upper Triassic, their numbers increased again. Cidaroids have changed very little since the Late Triassic, and are the only Paleozoic echinoid group to have survived.

The euechinoids diversified into new lineages in the Jurassic and Cretaceous periods, and from them emerged the first irregular echinoids (the Atelostomata) during the early Jurassic.

Some echinoids, such as Micraster in the chalk of the Cretaceous period, serve as zone or index fossils. Because they are abundant and evolved rapidly, they enable geologists to date the surrounding rocks.

In the Paleogene and Neogene periods (circa 66 to 2.6 Mya), sand dollars (Clypeasteroida) arose. Their distinctive, flattened tests and tiny spines were adapted to life on or under loose sand in shallow water, and they are abundant as fossils in southern European limestones and sandstones.

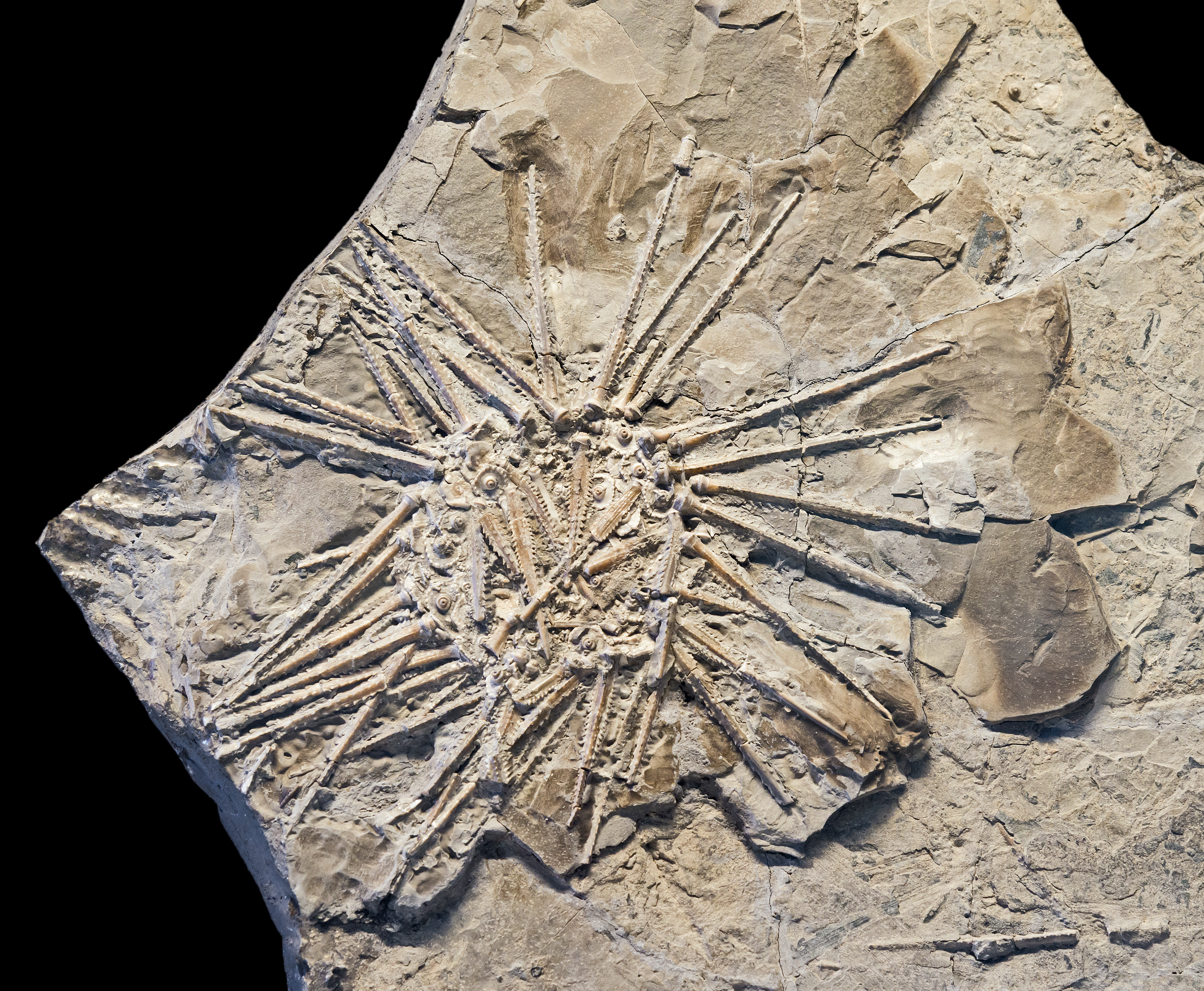
Archaeocidaris brownwoodensis, Cidaroida, Carboniferous, c. 300 mya

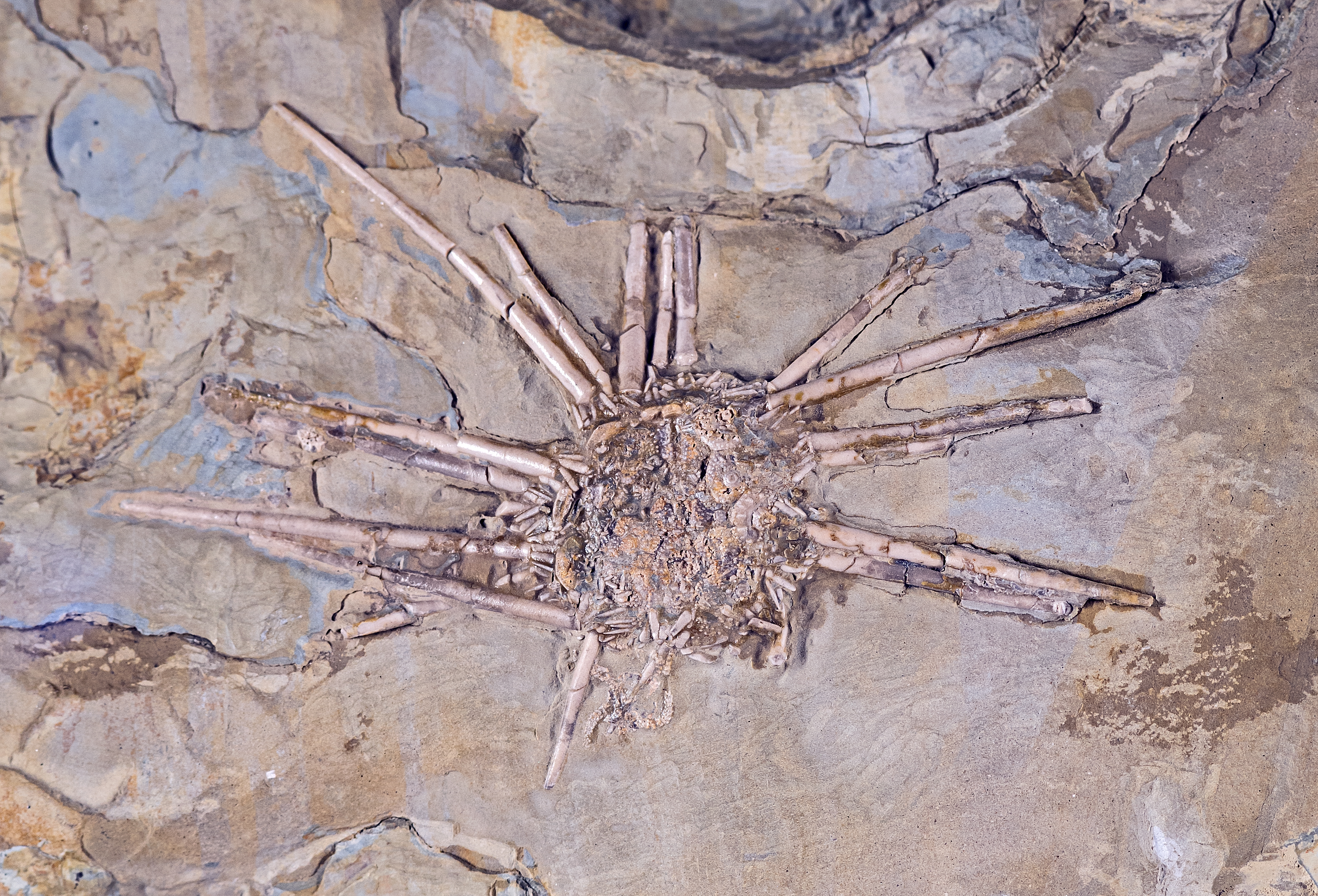
Miocidaris coaeva, Cidaroida, Middle Triassic, c. 240 mya

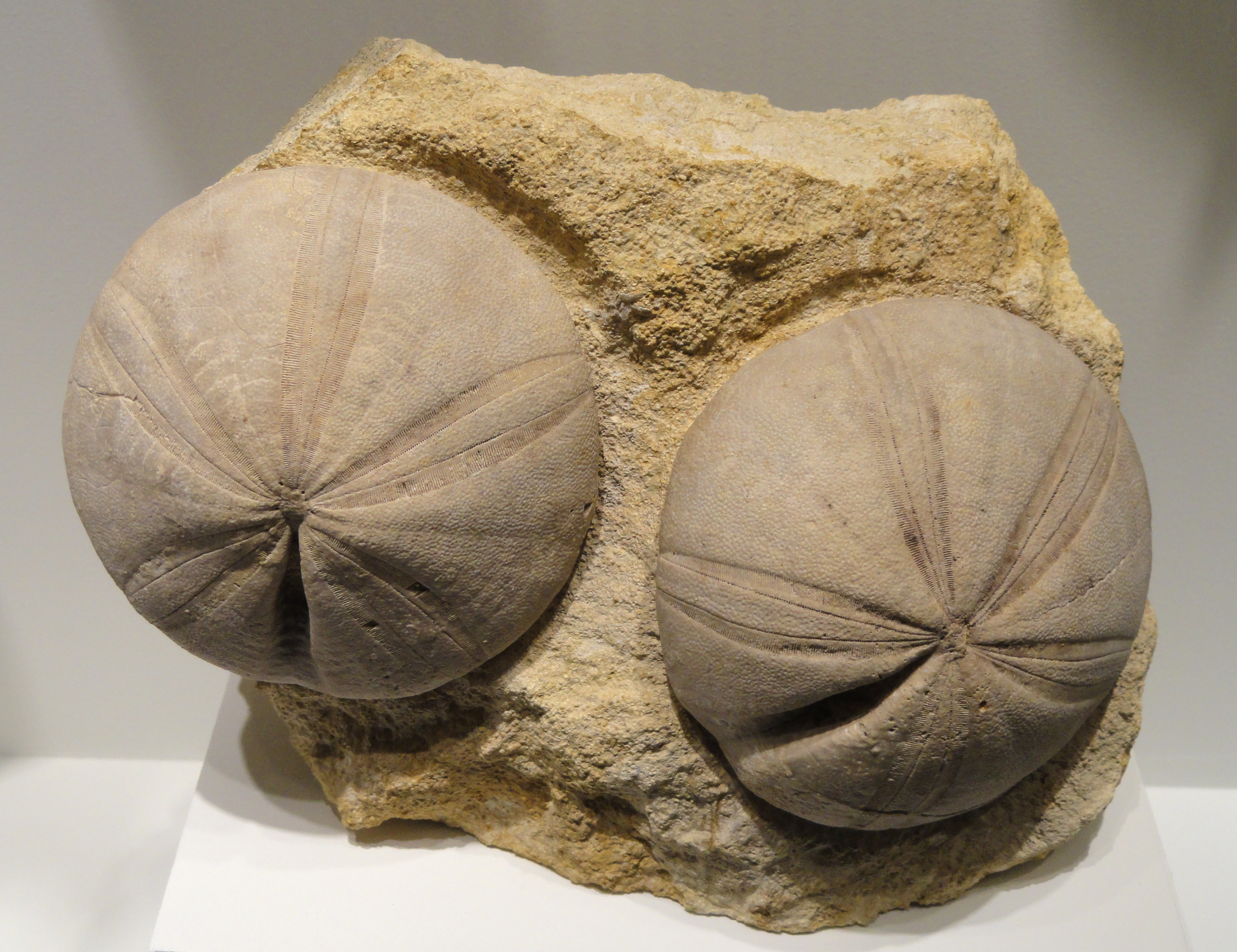
Clypeus plotti, Irregularia, Middle Jurassic, c. 162 mya
(gives its name to the Clypeus Grit of Western England, part of the Oolite.)

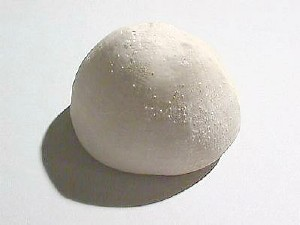
Echinocorys, Holasteroida, Upper Cretaceous, c. 80 mya

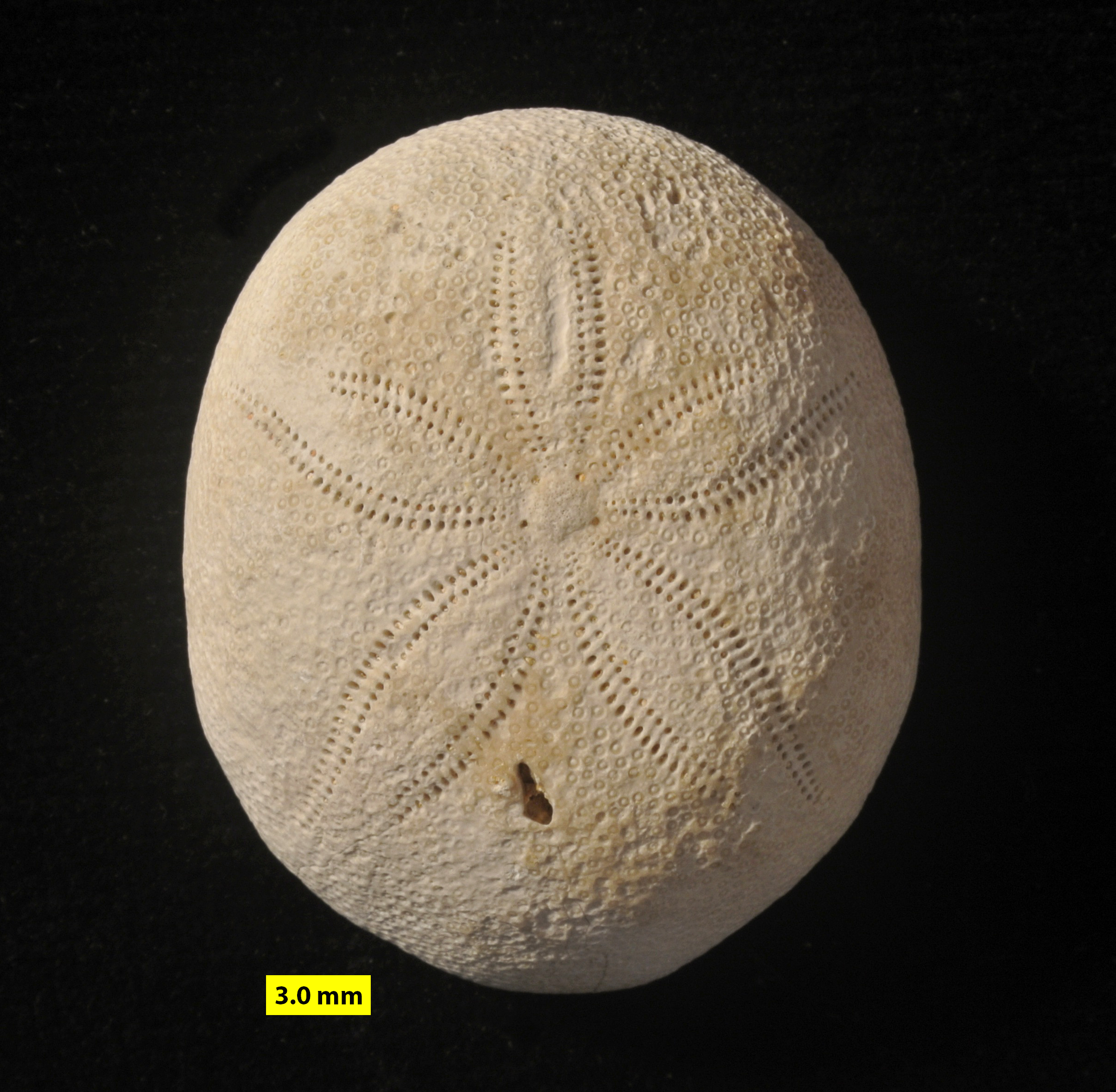
Echinolampas ovalis, Cassiduloida, Middle Eocene, c. 40 mya

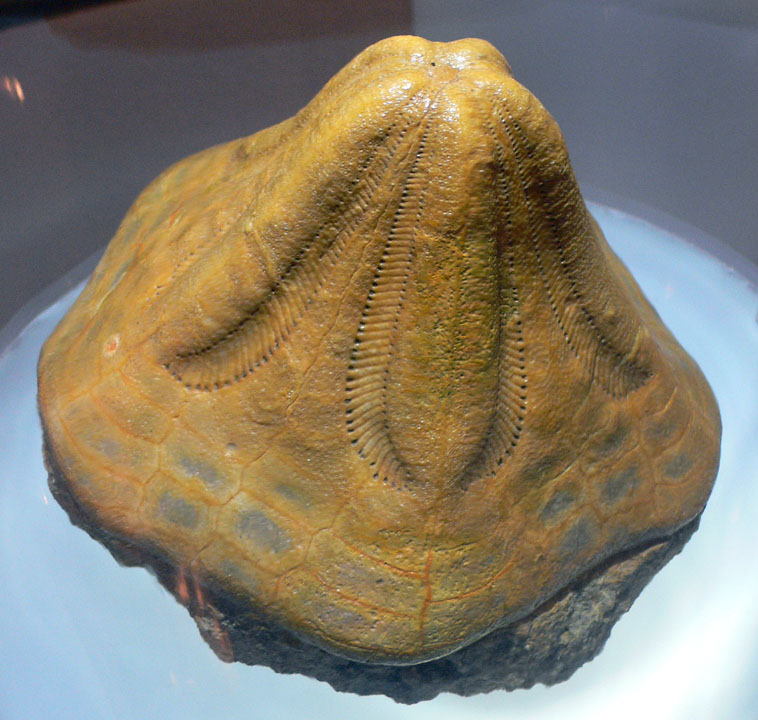
Clypeaster portentosus, Clypeasteroida, Miocene, c. 10 mya

=== Phylogeny ===
==== External ====
Echinoids are deuterostome animals, like the chordates. A 2014 analysis of 219 genes from all classes of echinoderms gives the following phylogenetic tree.

- Deuterostomia Deuterostomes
  - Chordata Chordates
  - Ambulacraria
    - Echinodermata Echinoderms
      - Eleutherozoa
        - Echinozoa
          - Holothuroidea Sea cucumbers
          - Echinoidea Sea urchins
        - Asterozoa
          - Ophiuroidea Brittle stars
          - Asteroidea Starfish
      - Crinoidea Crinoids
    - - Hemichordata Hemichordates

==== Internal ====
The phylogeny of the sea urchins is as follows:

- Echinoidea 450 mya
  - Cidaroida
  - Euechinoidea
    - Echinothurioida
    - Acroechinoidea
      - Diadematoida
      - - Irregularia
        - - Pedinoida
          - - Salenioida
            - Echinacea
              - Stomopneustidae
              - - Arbaciidae
                - Camarodonta
                  - Parasaleniidae
                  - - - Temnopleuridae
                      - Trigonocidaridae
                    - Echinoida
                      - Echinidae
                      - - Parechinidae
                        - - Toxopneustidae
                          - - Echinometridae
                            - Strongylocentrotidae

The phylogenetic study from 2022 presents a different topology of the Euechinoidea phylogenetic tree. Irregularia are sister group of Echinacea (including Salenioida) forming a common clade Carinacea, basal groups Aspidodiadematoida, Diadematoida, Echinothurioida, Micropygoida, and Pedinoida are comprised in a common basal clade Aulodonta.

== Relation to humans ==
=== Injuries ===
Sea urchin injury on the top side of the foot. This injury resulted in some skin staining from the natural purple-black dye of the urchin.

Sea urchin injuries are puncture wounds inflicted by the animal's brittle, fragile spines. These are a common source of injury to ocean swimmers, especially along coastal surfaces where coral with stationary sea urchins are present. Their stings vary in severity depending on the species. Their spines can be venomous or cause infection. Granuloma and staining of the skin from the natural dye inside the sea urchin can also occur. Breathing problems may indicate a serious reaction to toxins in the sea urchin. They inflict a painful wound when they penetrate human skin, but are not themselves dangerous if fully removed promptly; if left in the skin, further problems may occur.

=== Science ===
Sea urchins are traditional model organisms in developmental biology. This use originated in the 1800s, when their embryonic development became easily viewed by microscopy. The transparency of the urchin's eggs enabled them to be used to observe that sperm cells actually fertilize ova. They continue to be used for embryonic studies, as prenatal development continues to seek testing for fatal diseases. Sea urchins are being used in longevity studies for comparison between the young and old of the species, particularly for their ability to regenerate tissue as needed. Scientists at the University of St Andrews have discovered a genetic sequence, the '2A' region, in sea urchins previously thought to have belonged only to viruses like foot-and-mouth disease virus. More recently, Eric H. Davidson and Roy John Britten argued for the use of urchins as a model organism due to their easy availability, high fecundity, and long lifespan. Beyond embryology, urchins provide an opportunity to research cis-regulatory elements. Oceanography has taken an interest in monitoring the health of urchins and their populations as a way to assess overall ocean acidification, temperatures, and ecological impacts.

The organism's evolutionary placement and unique embryology with five-fold symmetry were the major arguments in the proposal to seek the sequencing of its genome. Importantly, echinoderms and hemichordates act as the closest living relatives to chordates and thus are of interest for the light they can shed on the evolution of vertebrates. The genome of Strongylocentrotus purpuratus was completed in 2006 and established homology between sea urchin and vertebrate immune system-related genes. Sea urchins code for at least 222 Toll-like receptor genes and over 200 genes related to the Nod-like-receptor family found in vertebrates. This increases its usefulness as a valuable model organism for studying the evolution of innate immunity. The sequencing also revealed that while some genes were thought to be limited to vertebrates, there were also innovations that have previously never been seen outside the chordate classification, such as immune transcription factors PU.1 and SPIB.

=== As food ===
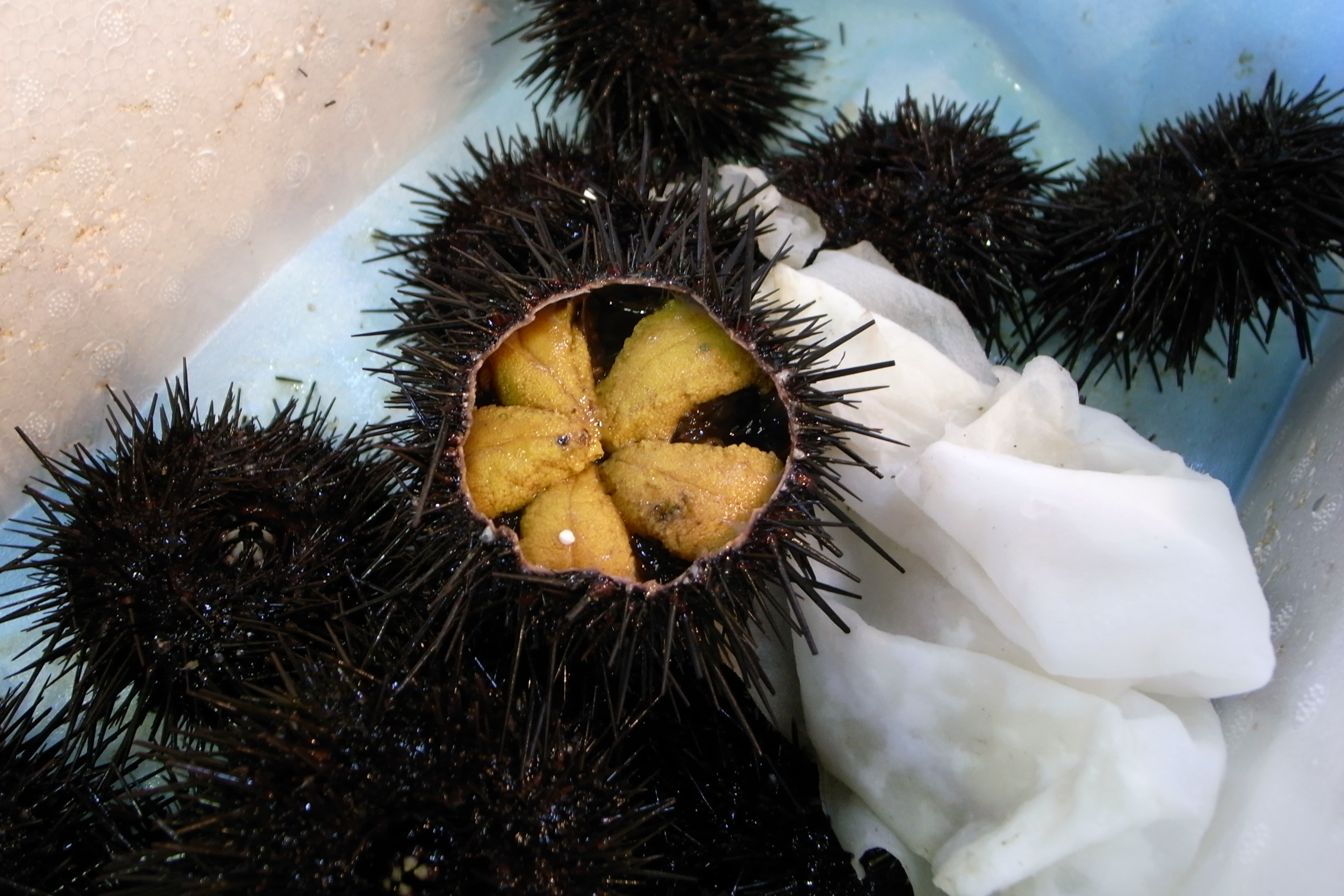
Sea urchin cut open, revealing the roe inside

The gonads of both male and female sea urchins, sometimes euphemized as sea urchin "roe" or "corals", are culinary delicacies in many parts of the world, especially Japan. In Japan, sea urchin is known as uni (うに), and its gonads (the only meaty, edible parts of the animal) can retail for as much as ¥40,000 ($360) per kilogram; they are served raw as sashimi or in sushi, with soy sauce and wasabi. Japan imports large quantities from the United States, South Korea, and other producers. Japan consumes 50,000 tons annually, amounting to over 80% of global production. Japanese demand for sea urchins has raised concerns about overfishing.

Sea urchins are commonly eaten stuffed with rice in the traditional oko-oko dish among the Sama-Bajau people of the Philippines. They were once foraged by coastal Malay communities of Singapore who call them jani. In New Zealand, Evechinus chloroticus, known as kina in Māori, is a delicacy, traditionally eaten raw. Though New Zealand fishermen would like to export them to Japan, their quality is too variable.

In Mediterranean cuisines, Paracentrotus lividus is often eaten raw, or with lemon, and known as ricci on Italian menus where it is sometimes used in pasta sauces. It can also flavour omelettes, scrambled eggs, fish soup, mayonnaise, béchamel sauce for tartlets, the boullie for a soufflé, or Hollandaise sauce to make a fish sauce. In the region of Marseille, sea urchin are commonly eaten in dedicated food festival called oursinade.

On the Pacific Coast of North America, Strongylocentrotus franciscanus was praised by Euell Gibbons; Strongylocentrotus purpuratus is also eaten. Native Americans in California are also known to eat sea urchins. The coast of Southern California is known as a source of high quality uni, with divers picking sea urchin from kelp beds in depths as deep as 24 m/80 ft. As of 2013, the state was limiting the practice to 300 sea urchin diver licenses. Though the edible Strongylocentrotus droebachiensis is found in the North Atlantic, it is not widely eaten. However, sea urchins (called uutuk in Alutiiq) are commonly eaten by the Alaska Native population around Kodiak Island. It is commonly exported, mostly to Japan. In the West Indies, slate pencil urchins are eaten.

In Chilean cuisine, it is served raw with lemon, onions, and olive oil.

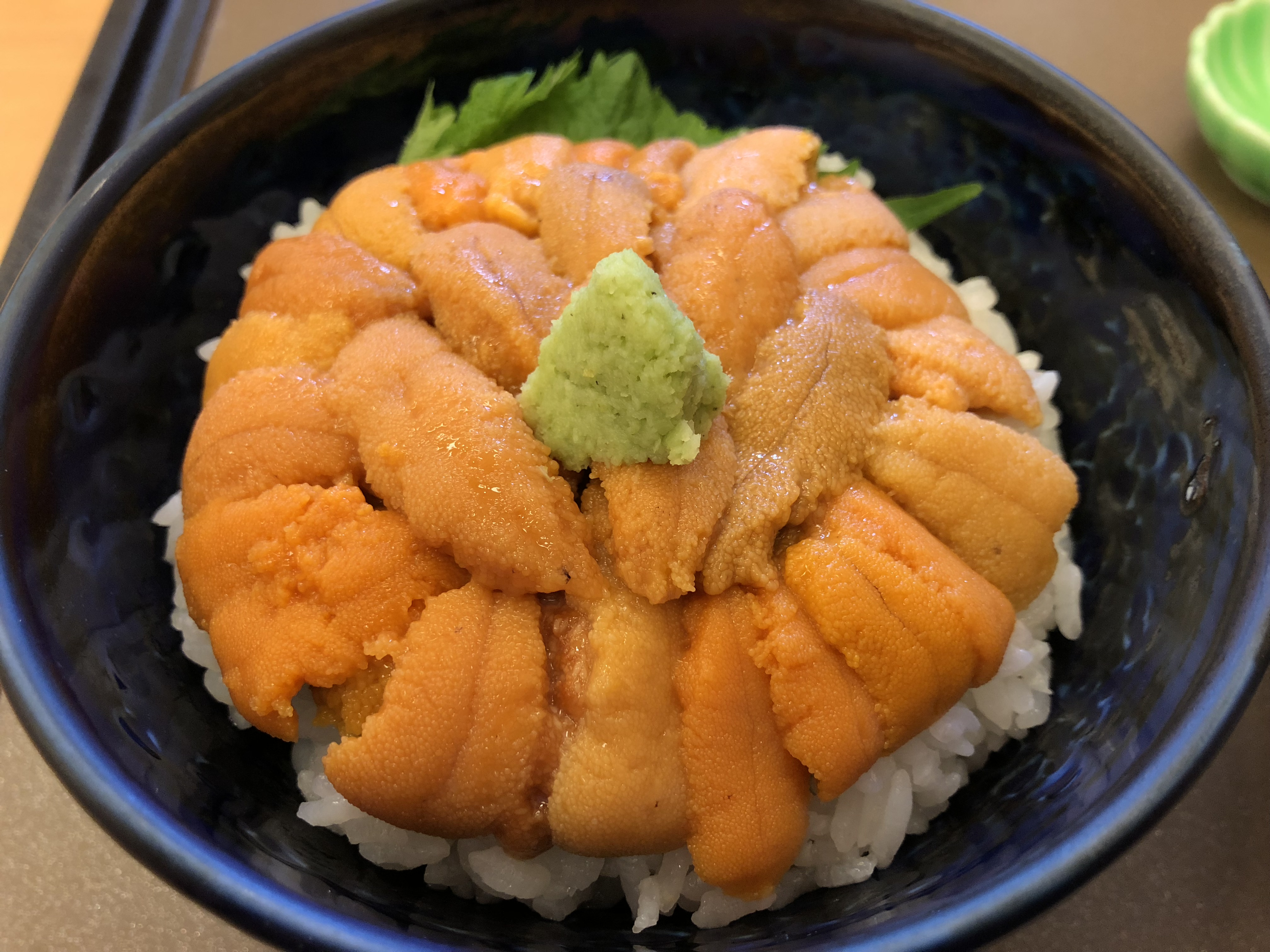
Japanese uni-don, or rice bowl with sea urchin roe

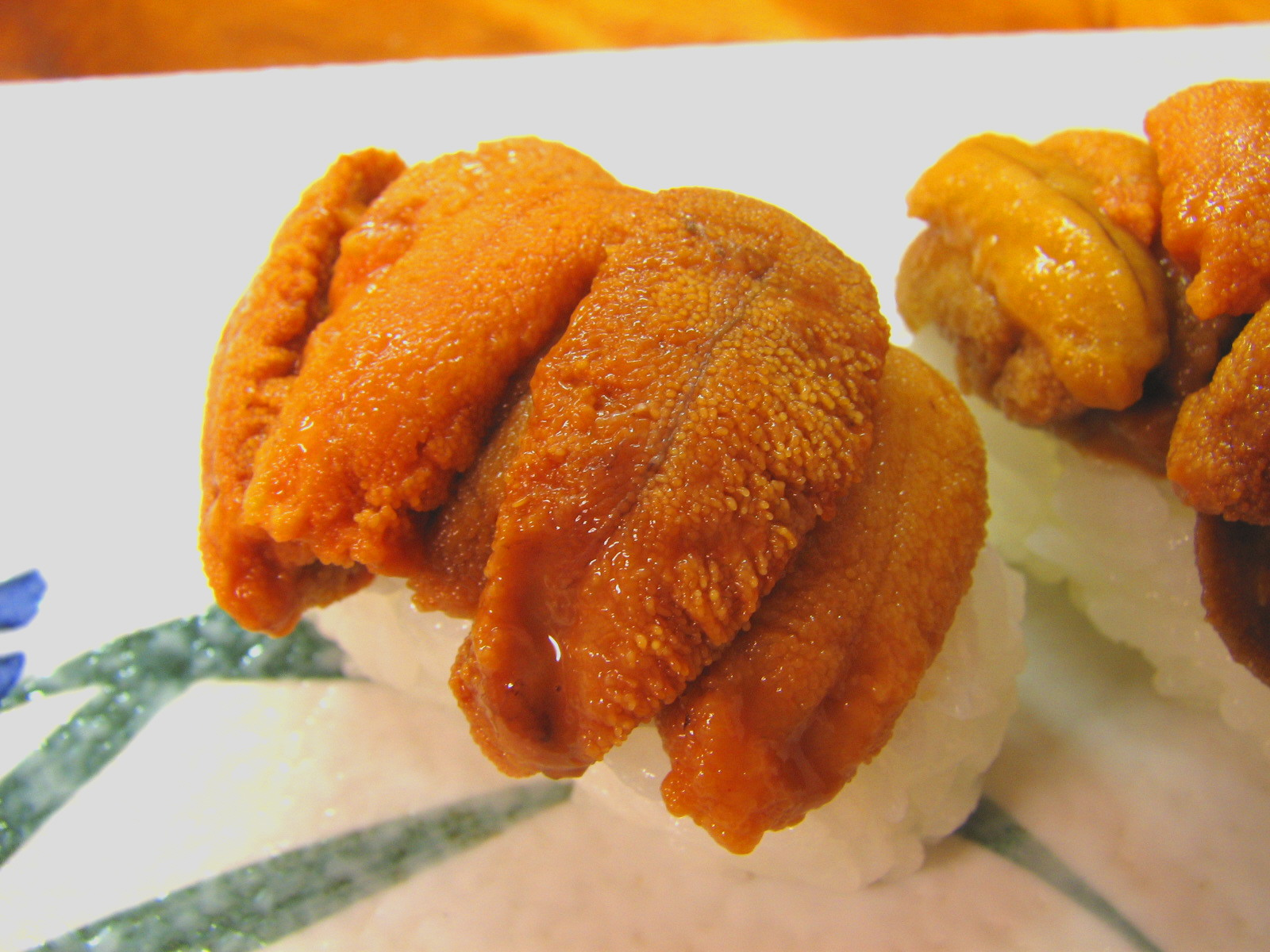
Japanese nigirizushi with sea urchin roe

Japanese gunkanmaki with sea urchin roe

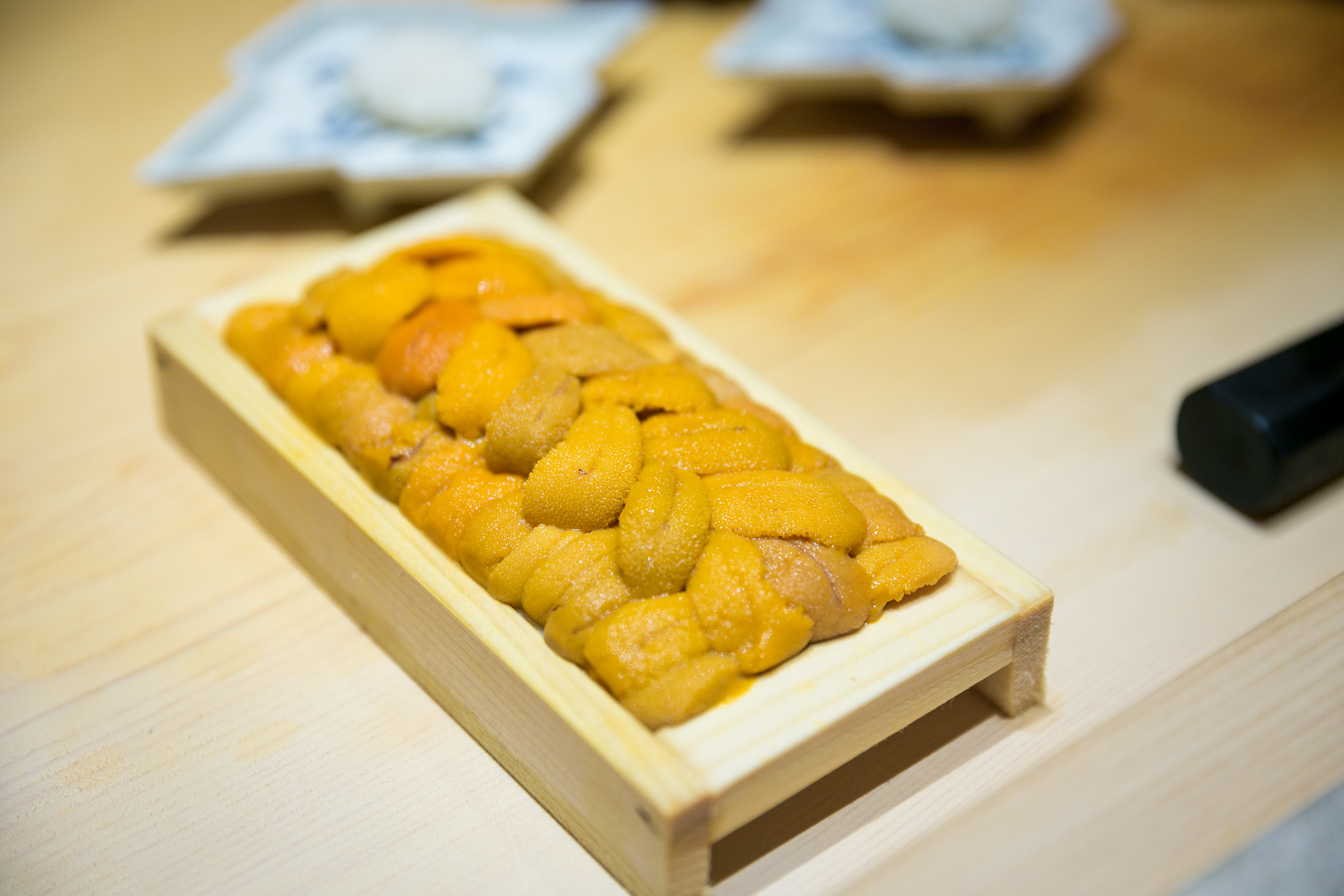
Sea urchin roe (uni) sashimi

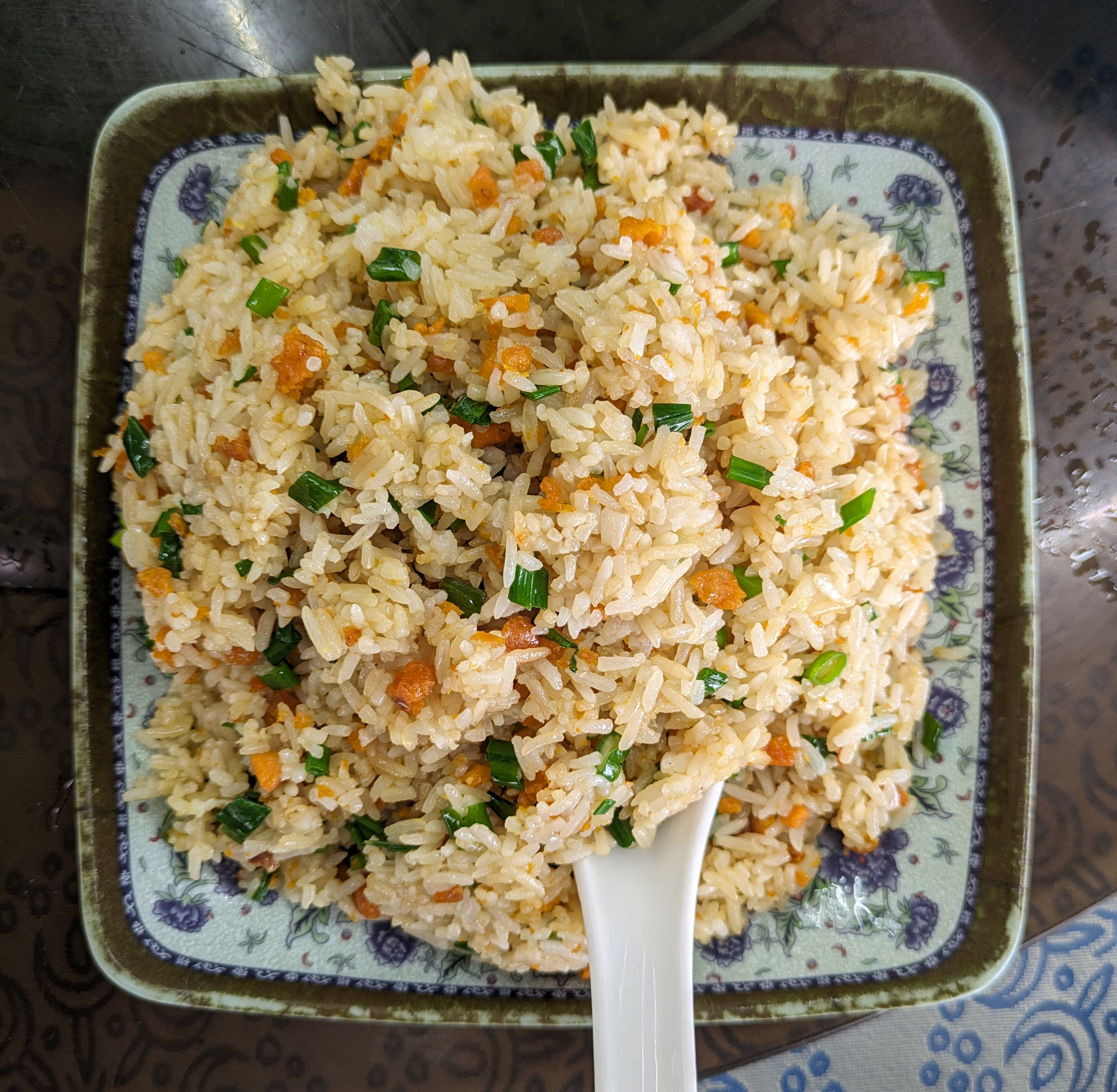
Fried rice with sea urchin (海胆, hǎidǎn) served in China

=== Aquaria ===
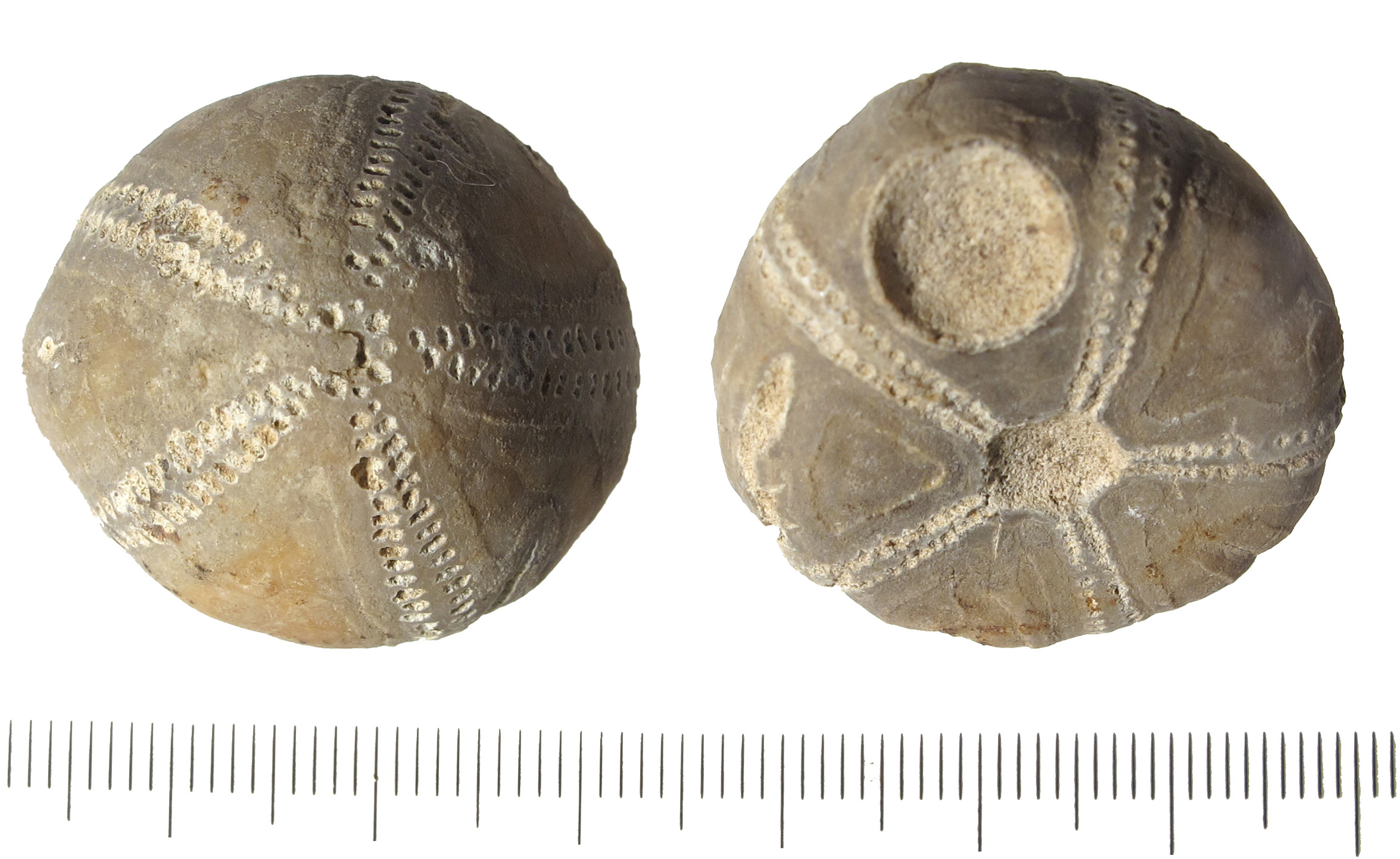
A fossil sea urchin found on a Middle Saxon site in Lincolnshire, thought to have been used as an amulet

Some species of sea urchins, such as the slate pencil urchin (Eucidaris tribuloides), are commonly sold in aquarium stores. Some species are effective at controlling filamentous algae, and they make good additions to an invertebrate tank.

=== Folklore ===
A folk tradition in Denmark and southern England imagined sea urchin fossils to be thunderbolts, able to ward off harm by lightning or by witchcraft, as an apotropaic symbol. Another version supposed they were petrified eggs of snakes, able to protect against heart and liver disease, poisons, and injury in battle, and accordingly they were carried as amulets. These were, according to the legend, created by magic from foam made by the snakes at midsummer.
