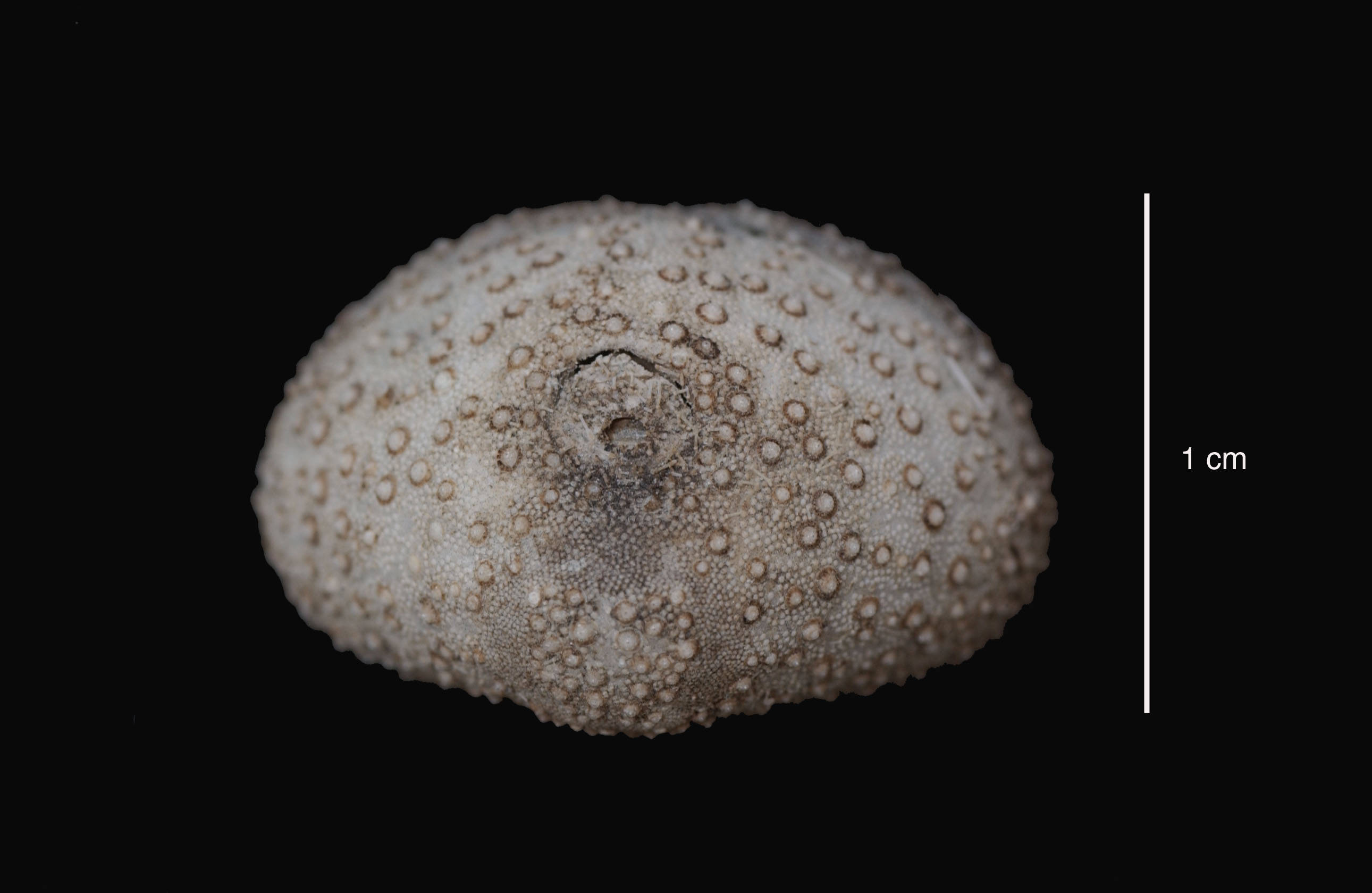

Scientific classification
- Domain: Eukaryota
- Kingdom: Animalia
- Phylum: Echinodermata
- Class: Echinoidea
- Order: Holasteroida
- Family: Urechinidae
- Genus: Antrechinus
- Species: A. mortenseni

Binomial name
- Antrechinus mortenseni (David & Mooi, 1990)

= Antrechinus mortenseni =

Species of sea urchin

Antrechinus mortenseni is a species of sea urchin of the family Urechinidae. Their armour is covered with spines. Antrechinus mortenseni was first scientifically described in 1990 by David & Mooi.
