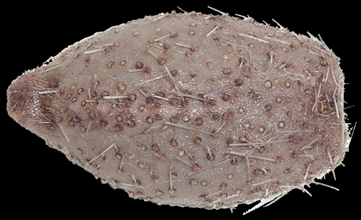
- Pourtalesia miranda

Scientific classification
- Kingdom: Animalia
- Phylum: Echinodermata
- Class: Echinoidea
- Order: Holasteroida
- Family: Pourtalesiidae
- Genus: Pourtalesia; A. Agassiz, 1869

= Pourtalesia =

Genus of sea urchins

Pourtalesia is a genus of the family Pourtalesiidae which belongs to the irregular (bilaterally symmetrical) sea urchins. The animals measure 5–6 cm in length and live in the abyssal zone of the Atlantic, Pacific, Indopacific and Antarctic Oceans where they have been found in more than 3,000 m depth. The mouth opening of these animals is located anteriorly and the lantern of Aristotle is missing as typically for holasteroid sea urchins.

== Species ==
Currently, 11 species of Pourtalesia are recognized.

- Pourtalesia alcocki Koehler, 1914
- Pourtalesia aurorae Koehler, 1926
- Pourtalesia debilis Koehler, 1926
- Pourtalesia heptneri Mironov, 1978
- Pourtalesia hispida A. Agassiz, 1897
- Pourtalesia jeffreysi Thomson, 1873
- Pourtalesia laguncula A. Agassiz, 1879
- Pourtalesia miranda A. Agassiz, 1869
- Pourtalesia tanneri A. Agassiz, 1898
- Pourtalesia thomsoni Mironov, 1976
- Pourtalesia vinogradovae Mironov, 1995
