= Antrechinus nordenskjoldi =

Scientific classification
- Domain: Eukaryota
- Kingdom: Animalia
- Phylum: Echinodermata
- Class: Echinoidea
- Order: Holasteroida
- Family: Urechinidae
- Genus: Antrechinus
- Species: A. nordenskjoldi

Binomial name
- Antrechinus nordenskjoldi (Mortensen, 1905)

Species of sea urchin

Antrechinus nordenskjoldi is a species of sea urchin of the family Urechinidae. Their armour is covered with spines. It is placed in the genus Antrechinus and lives in the sea. Antrechinus nordenskjoldi was first scientifically described in 1905 by Ole Theodor Jensen Mortensen.
