= Antrechinus drygalskii =

Scientific classification
- Domain: Eukaryota
- Kingdom: Animalia
- Phylum: Echinodermata
- Class: Echinoidea
- Order: Holasteroida
- Family: Urechinidae
- Genus: Antrechinus
- Species: A. drygalskii

Binomial name
- Antrechinus drygalskii (Mortensen, 1905)

Species of sea urchin

Antrechinus drygalskii is a species of sea urchin of the family Urechinidae. Their armour is covered with spines. It is placed in the genus Antrechinus and lives in the sea. Antrechinus drygalskii was first scientifically described in 1905 by Ole Mortensen, Danish zoologist.
