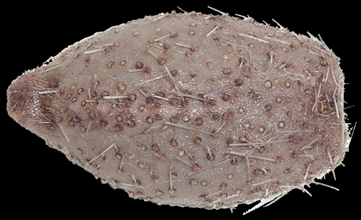
- Pourtalesia miranda

Scientific classification
- Kingdom: Animalia
- Phylum: Echinodermata
- Class: Echinoidea
- Order: Holasteroida
- Family: Pourtalesiidae; Agassiz, 1881

= Pourtalesiidae =

Family of sea urchins

The pourtalesiids (Pourtalesiidae) are a family of irregular sea urchins that live in the deep sea. They are secondarily bilateral-symmetrical and like other representatives of the taxon Holasteroida they lack the lantern of Aristotle, which is typical for many other sea urchins. The genus Pourtalesia was named after Louis-François de Pourtalès who first collected these animals while dredging at a depth of 600 m. The family is known already from the Upper Cretaceous (Maastrichtian) and is distributed worldwide.

== Species and genera ==
Currently, there are 10 genera with 28 extant and 5 extinct species described.

- genus Ceratophysa Pomel, 1883
  - Ceratophysa ceratopyga (A. Agassiz, 1879)
  - Ceratophysa rosea (A. Agassiz, 1879)
- genus Cystocrepis Mortensen, 1907
  - Cystocrepis setigera (A. Agassiz, 1898)
- genus Echinocrepis A. Agassiz, 1879
  - Echinocrepis cuneata A. Agassiz, 1879
  - Echinocrepis rostrata Mironov, 1973
- genus Echinosigra Mortensen, 1907
  - Echinosigra (Echinogutta) amphora Mironov, 1974
  - Echinosigra (Echinogutta) antarctica Mironov, 1974
  - Echinosigra (Echinogutta) fabrefacta Mironov, 1974
  - Echinosigra (Echinogutta) valvaedentata Mironov, 1974
  - Echinosigra (Echinosigra) mortensi Mironov, 1974
  - Echinosigra (Echinosigra) phiale (Thomson, 1873)
  - Echinosigra (Echinosigra) porrecta Mironov, 1974
  - Echinosigra (Echinosigra) vityazi Mironov, 1997
- genus Galeaster Seunes, 1889 †
  - Galeaster carinatus Ravn, 1927 †
  - Galeaster dagestanensis Poslavskaya & Moskvin, 1960 †
  - Galeaster minor Poslavskaya, in Moskvin & Poslavskaya, 1949 †
  - Galeaster muntshiensis Tzaghareli, 1949 †
  - Galeaster sumbaricus Poslavskaya, in Moskvin & Poslavskaya, 1949 †
- genus Helgocystis Mortensen, 1907
  - Helgocystis carinata (A. Agassiz, 1879)
- genus Pourtalesia A. Agassiz, 1869
  - Pourtalesia alcocki Koehler, 1914
  - Pourtalesia aurorae Koehler, 1926
  - Pourtalesia debilis Koehler, 1926
  - Pourtalesia heptneri Mironov, 1978
  - Pourtalesia hispida A. Agassiz, 1897
  - Pourtalesia jeffreysi Thomson, 1873
  - Pourtalesia laguncula A. Agassiz, 1879
  - Pourtalesia miranda A. Agassiz, 1869
  - Pourtalesia tanneri A. Agassiz, 1898
  - Pourtalesia thomsoni Mironov, 1976
  - Pourtalesia vinogradovae Mironov, 1995
- genus Rictocystis Mironov, 1996
  - Rictocystis jensenae Mironov, 1996
- genus Solenocystis Mironov, 2008
  - Solenocystis imitans Mironov, 2008
- genus Spatagocystis A. Agassiz, 1879
  - Spatagocystis challengeri A. Agassiz, 1879
