= Ceratophysa rosea =

Scientific classification
- Kingdom: Animalia
- Phylum: Echinodermata
- Class: Echinoidea
- Order: Holasteroida
- Family: Pourtalesiidae
- Genus: Ceratophysa
- Species: C. rosea

Binomial name
- Ceratophysa rosea (A. Agassiz, 1879)

Species of sea urchin

Ceratophysa rosea is a species of sea urchins of the family Pourtalesiidae. Their armour is covered with spines. Ceratophysa rosea was first scientifically described in 1879 by Alexander Emanuel Agassiz.
