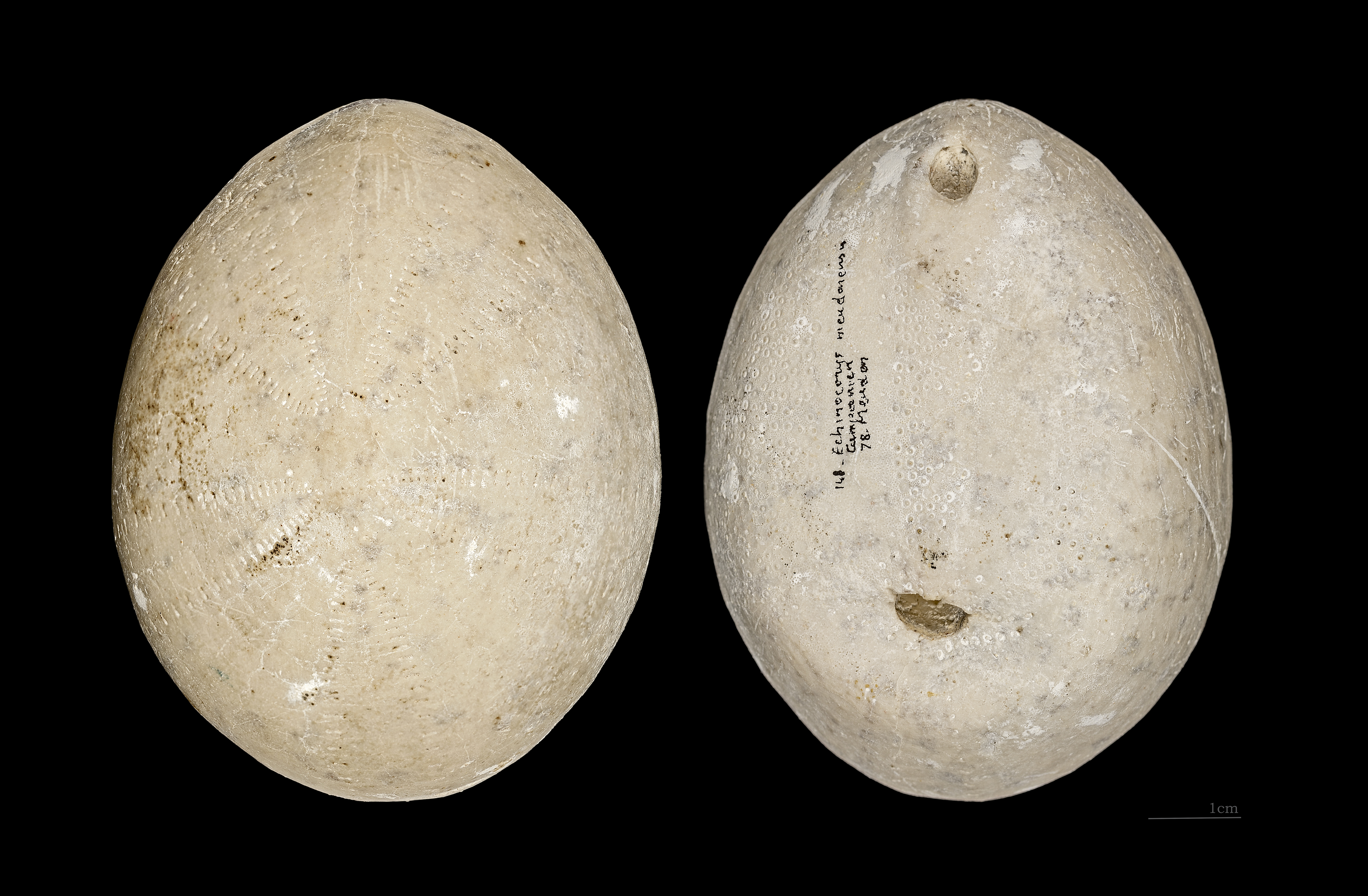
- Echinocorys meudonensis MHNT

Scientific classification
- Kingdom: Animalia
- Phylum: Echinodermata
- Class: Echinoidea
- Order: Holasteroida
- Family: †Holasteridae
- Genus: †Echinocorys

= Echinocorys =

Echinocorys Temporal range: Late Cretaceous-Paleocene

Extinct genus of sea urchins

Echinocorys is an extinct genus of echinoids that lived from the Late Cretaceous to the Paleocene. The genus belongs to the Holasteridae family. Its remains have been found in Asia, Europe, Australia (Oceania) and North America.

== Sources ==
- Fossils (Smithsonian Handbooks) by David Ward (Page 182)
