= Calymne =

Scientific classification
- Kingdom: Animalia
- Phylum: Echinodermata
- Class: Echinoidea
- Order: Holasteroida
- Family: Calymnidae
- Genus: Calymne; Thomson, 1877
- Species: C. relicta

Binomial name
- Calymne relicta Thomson, 1877

Species of sea urchin

Calymne relicta is a species of sea urchins of the Family Calymnidae. It is the only species in the genus Calymne. Their armour is covered with spines. Calymne relicta was first scientifically described in 1877 by Thomson.
