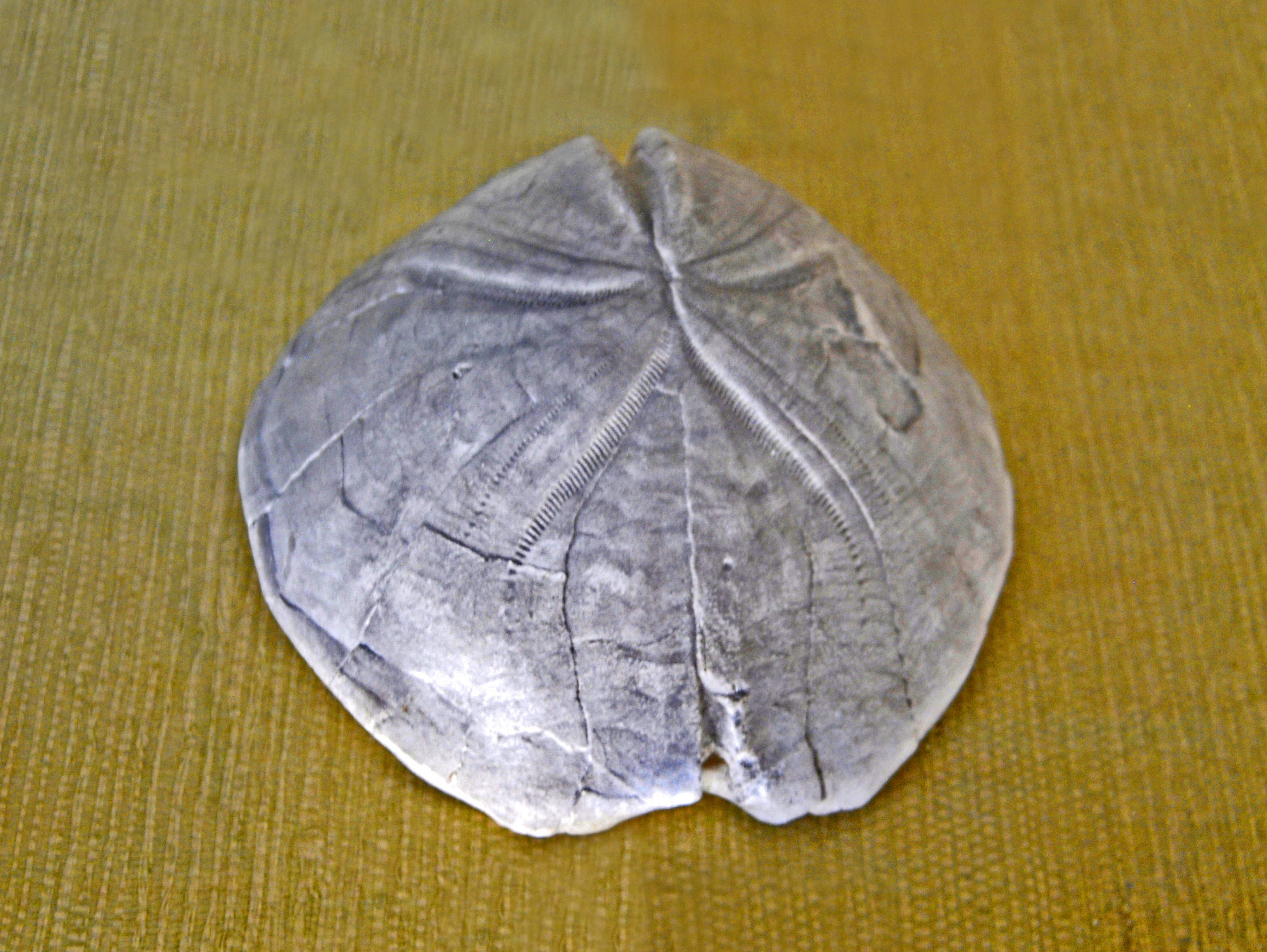
- Fossil of Hemipleustus oculatus from Belgium, on display at Galerie de paléontologie et d'anatomie comparée in Paris

Scientific classification
- Domain: Eukaryota
- Kingdom: Animalia
- Phylum: Echinodermata
- Class: Echinoidea
- Order: Holasteroida
- Suborder: Meridosternata
- Family: †Holasteridae; Pictet, 1857

= Holasteridae =

Holasteridae Temporal range: Cretaceous

Extinct family of sea urchins

Holasteridae is an extinct family of sea urchins.

These semi-infaunal detritivores lived during the Cretaceous period, from 140.2 to 53.0 Ma.

== Genera ==
- Aurelianaster
- Basseaster
- Cardiaster
- Cardiotaxis
- Cibaster
- Duncaniaster
- Echinocorys
- Entomaster
- Galeaster
- Ganbirretia
- Garumnaster
- Guettaria
- Hagenowia
- Hemipneustes
- Holaster
- Infulaster
- Ismidaster
- Jeronia
- Lampadaster
- Lampadocorys
- Messaoudia
- Offaster
- Opisopneustes
- Paronaster
- Pseudananchys
- Pseudholaster
- Pseudoffaster
- Pseudoholaster
- Rispolia
- Scagliaster
- Stegaster
- Sternotaxis
- Taphraster
- Tholaster
- Titanaster
- Toxopatagus
- Zumoffenia
