= Antrechinus =

Scientific classification
- Kingdom: Animalia
- Phylum: Echinodermata
- Class: Echinoidea
- Order: Holasteroida
- Family: Urechinidae
- Genus: Antrechinus; Mooi & David, 1996

Genus of sea urchins

Antrechinus is a genus of echinoderms belonging to the family Urechinidae.

The species of this genus are found in the coasts of Antarctica.

Species:

- Antrechinus drygalskii (Mortensen, 1905)
- Antrechinus mortenseni (David & Mooi, 1990)
- Antrechinus nordenskjoldi (Mortensen, 1905)
