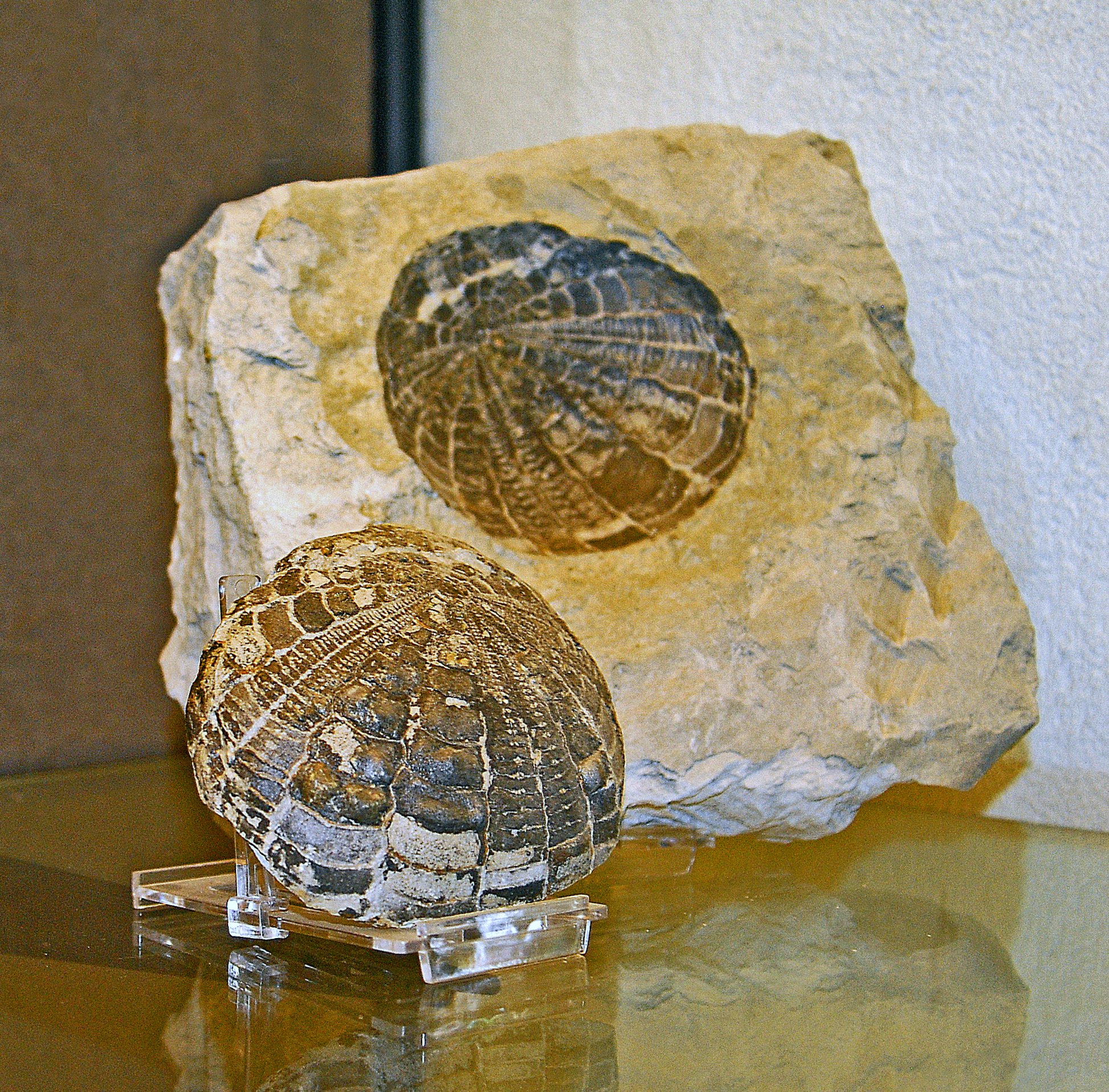
- Fossils of Toxopatagus

Scientific classification
- Kingdom: Animalia
- Phylum: Echinodermata
- Class: Echinoidea
- Order: Holasteroida
- Family: †Hemipneustidae; Lambert, 1917

= Hemipneustidae =

Extinct family of sea urchins

Hemipneustidae is an extinct family of sea urchins.

== Genera ==
- Hemipneustes L. Agassiz, 1835 †
- Medjesia Jeffery, 1997 †
- Opisopneustes Gauthier, 1889 †
- Plesiohemipneustes Smith & Wright, 2003 †
- Toxopatagus Pomel, 1883 †
