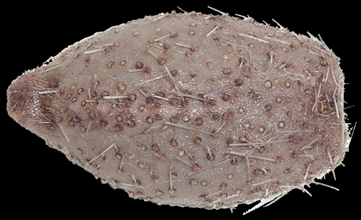

Conservation status
- Secure (NatureServe)

Scientific classification
- Kingdom: Animalia
- Phylum: Echinodermata
- Class: Echinoidea
- Order: Holasteroida
- Family: Pourtalesiidae
- Genus: Pourtalesia
- Species: P. miranda

Binomial name
- Pourtalesia miranda A. Agassiz, 1869

Synonyms
- Pourtalesia wandeli Mortensen, 1905

= Pourtalesia miranda =

Species of sea urchin

Pourtalesia miranda, commonly known as the wonderful sea urchin, is a species of sea urchin in the family Pourtalesiidae. It is found at abyssal depths in the Atlantic Ocean.

== Description ==
The thin-shelled test is bottle-shaped, more than twice as long as it is wide, and with a marked rostrum at the posterior end. At the anterior end, the aboral ambulacrum is sunk, forming a funnel-like, forward-facing, nearly circular opening that leads to the peristome. The aboral surface has scattered low tubercles. Pourtalesia miranda differs from the otherwise similar Helgocystis in having the posterior ambulacral plate separate from the others. Adults are about 2 cm (0.8 in) long.

The post-larval Pourtalesia miranda is at first radially symmetric, but as it grows, it becomes increasingly bilaterally symmetric. Growth is performed in two ways, by the creation of new plates at the apical end, and by the enlargement of existing plates by accretion around their margins. It is in the combination of these two mechanisms that this echinoid achieves its unusual form, with the fifth interambulacrum being progressively broken into two parts.

== Ecology ==
Deep water research was undertaken at Cap Blanc off Mauritania in West Africa, at depths between 1,000 and 2,000 metres (3,300 and 6,600 ft). This part of the seabed has a rich megafauna, perhaps because of the upwelling of strong currents near the seabed, and the churning of the sediment performed by the animals. At 2,000 metres (6,600 ft), the seabed community, as sampled by trawling, was found to be dominated by Pourtalesia miranda and the Venus flytrap sea anemone (Actinoscyphia aurelia). At the greater depth of 4,000 metres (13,000 ft), these animals had given way to the foraminiferan Reticulammina labyrintha, with individual tests reaching 6 cm (2.4 in) in length. In other parts of the abyss, live and dead sponges were the dominant lifeform; in general, the deeper the water, the fewer were the macrofauna present. A small commensal bivalve mollusc Axinodon symmetros was often found attached to the spines of the echinoid by byssal threads.
