= Corystusidae =

Scientific classification
- Kingdom: Animalia
- Phylum: Echinodermata
- Class: Echinoidea
- Order: Holasteroida
- Family: Corystusidae

Family of echinoderms

Corystusidae is a family of echinoderms belonging to the order Holasteroida.

Genera:

- Cardabia Foster & Philip, 1978
- Corystus Pomel, 1883
- Galeraster
- Huttonechinus Foster & Philip, 1978
