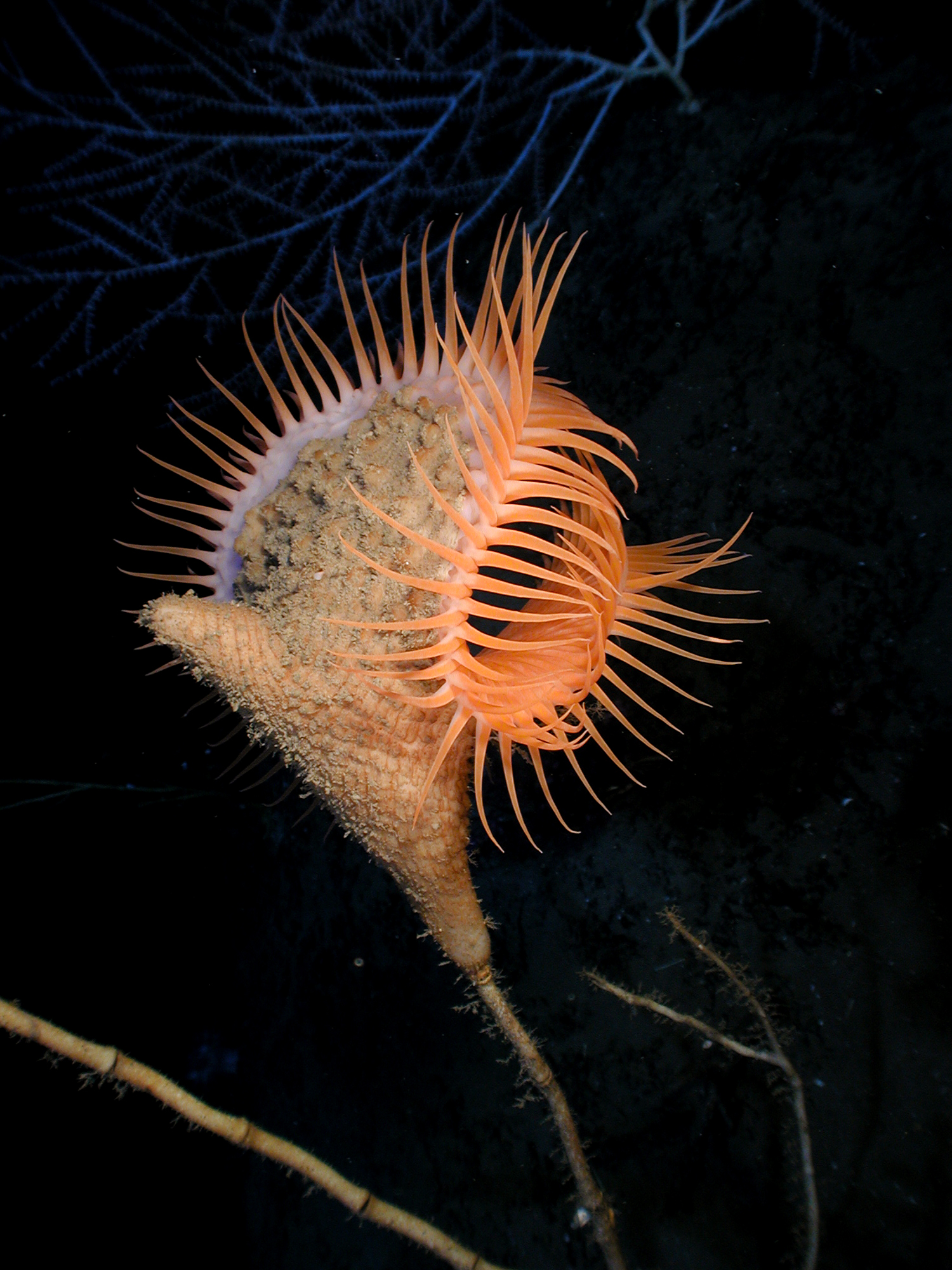

Scientific classification
- Kingdom: Animalia
- Phylum: Cnidaria
- Subphylum: Anthozoa
- Class: Hexacorallia
- Order: Actiniaria
- Family: Actinoscyphiidae
- Genus: Actinoscyphia
- Species: A. aurelia

Binomial name
- Actinoscyphia aurelia (Stephenson, 1918)

Synonyms
- Actinernus aurelia Stephenson, 1918

= Venus flytrap sea anemone =

Species of sea anemone

The Venus flytrap sea anemone (Actinoscyphia aurelia) is a large sea anemone that superficially resembles a Venus flytrap. It closes its tentacles to capture prey or to protect itself. It is a deep ocean species.

== Distribution ==
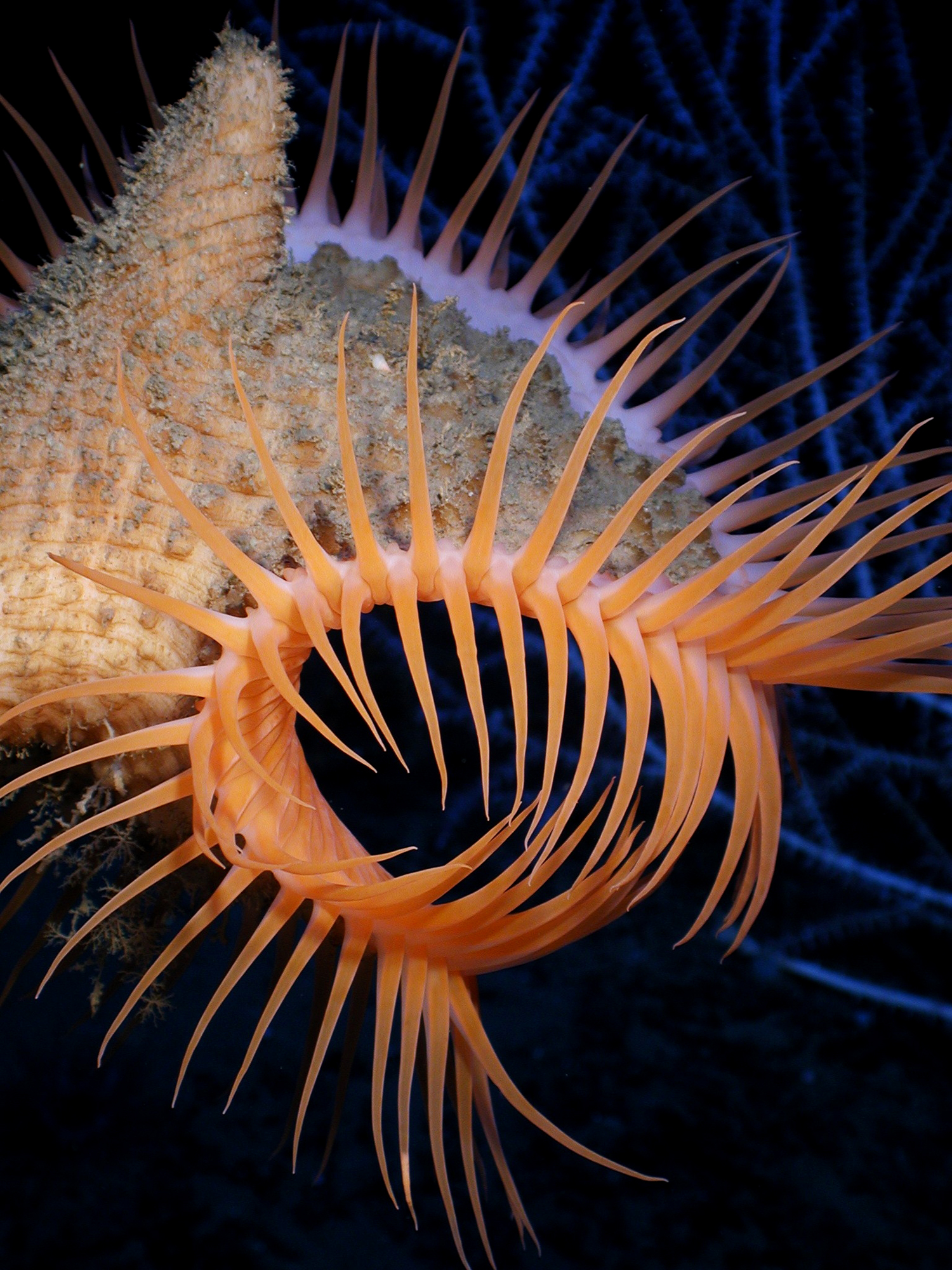
Actinoscyphia aurelia

This sea anemone is found in muddy situations at bathyal depths in deep water canyons in the Gulf of Mexico. It has also been observed at several sites in the upwelling region off the coast of West Africa as well as the American Samoan region of the Pacific, but is uncommon elsewhere.

== Biology ==
Venus flytrap sea anemone is a passive suspension feeder, and orients itself on its often slender column so that it faces the upwelling current. Its pedal disc is small, and its tentacles are short compared to the large, concave oral disc, which is funnel or mushroom-shaped. It extends its tentacles in two rows, one reflexed back and one sloping forward, and collects food particles as they drift past. Although usually considered sessile, the Venus flytrap sea anemone sometimes moves, particularly as a juvenile.

During deep water research off Cap Blanc, Mauritania, at depths between 1,000 and 2,000 metres (3,300 and 6,600 ft), the Venus flytrap sea anemone and the irregular sea urchin Pourtalesia miranda were found to dominate the benthic community.

In 2004 a mass mortality event occurred adjoining an oil pipeline off the Ivory Coast. Large numbers of the tunicate Pyrosoma atlanticum were involved, the moribund carcasses sinking to the seabed and accumulating in canyons and by the pipeline. Species found feeding on the gelatinous detritus varied by depth. At a depth of 900 metres (3,000 ft) few fish were present, but Venus flytrap sea anemones were numerous. Other necrophagous invertebrates at this depth included the sea anemone Actinostola sp., the sea pen Pennatula sp., the sea urchins Phormosoma sp. and Mesothuria sp., brittle stars in the family Ophiolepididae, the penaeid shrimp Parapenaeus sp. and the sea spider Colossendeis sp.
