= Oligopygoida =

Scientific classification
- Kingdom: Animalia
- Phylum: Echinodermata
- Class: Echinoidea
- Subclass: Euechinoidea
- Infraclass: Irregularia
- Order: †Oligopygoida; Kier, 1967

Families
- Family Oligopygidae; Genus Haimea; Genus Microlampas; Genus Oligopygus; Genus Ovulechinus; Genus Protolampas; Genus Bonnaireaster; Genus Pauropygus; Genus Microsoma

Extinct order of sea urchins

Oligopygoida is an extinct order of irregular echinoids. The group is closely related to the Clypeasteroida, and may be representative of its ancestral clypeasteroid. The order was once grouped together with the cassiduloids. However unlike them, oligopygoids have a well-developed lantern uncommon amongst urchins and holectypoids, but similar to that of clypeasteroids. Phylogenetic analysis has shown the clypeasteroids to be a sister group to oligopygoids. However they are differentiated by the lack of accessory ambulacral pores, which are characteristic of that group. They also have well-developed petals above small, wedge-shaped demiplates. Each of these has simple ambulacral pore. The presence of these demiplates is unique to this order. The apical disk is monobasal, with a deep sunken typically sunken deep.

Early research into this order recognized one family (Oligopygidae; Duncan 1889), and two genera, (Haimea; Michelin, 1851; Oligopygus; de Loriol, 1888). However a major revision was made by Kier in 1967 who recognized the order.
