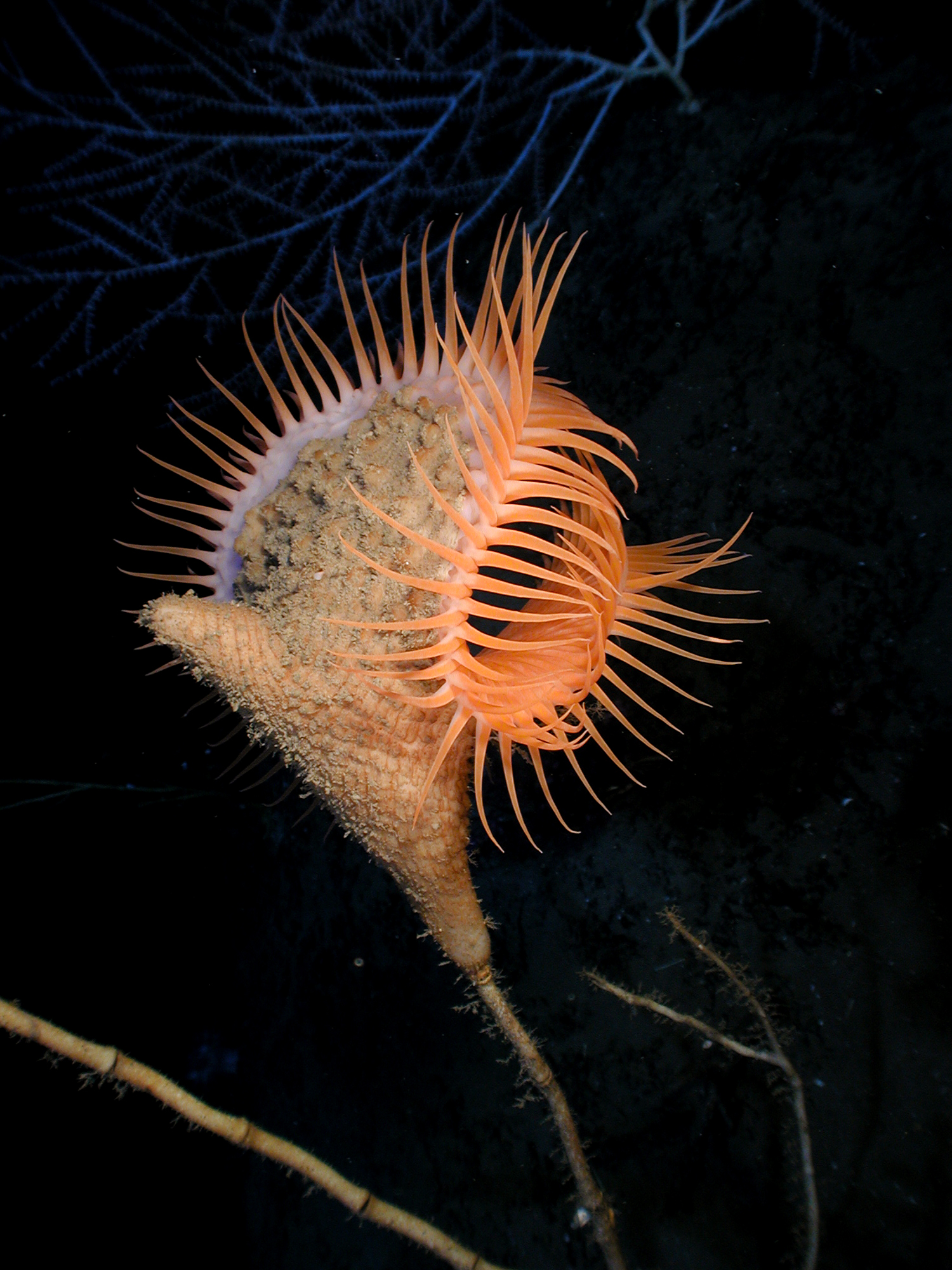
- Actinoscyphia aurelia

Scientific classification
- Kingdom: Animalia
- Phylum: Cnidaria
- Subphylum: Anthozoa
- Class: Hexacorallia
- Order: Actiniaria
- Superfamily: Metridioidea
- Family: Actinoscyphiidae; Stephenson, 1920

= Actinoscyphiidae =

Family of sea anemones

Actinoscyphiidae is a family of sea anemones containing two genera, which are:

- Actinoscyphia Stephenson, 1920
- Epiparactis Carlgren, 1921
