= Calymnidae =

Scientific classification
- Kingdom: Animalia
- Phylum: Echinodermata
- Class: Echinoidea
- Order: Holasteroida
- Family: Calymnidae; Mortensen, 1907

Family of sea urchins

Calymnidae is a family of echinoderms belonging to the order Holasteroida.

Genera:

- Calymne Thomson, 1877
- Chelonechinus Bather, 1934
- Pseudoffaster Lambert, 1924
- Sternopatagus de Meijere, 1903
