= Carnarechinus =

Carnarechinus Temporal range: Early Cretaceous–recent

Scientific classification
- Kingdom: Animalia
- Phylum: Echinodermata
- Class: Echinoidea
- Order: Holasteroida
- Suborder: Meridosternata
- Infraorder: Urechinina
- Family: Carnarechinidae; Mironov, 1993
- Genus: Carnarechinus; Mironov, 1978
- Species: C. clypeatus

Binomial name
- Carnarechinus clypeatus (A. Agassiz, 1879)

Genus of sea urchins

Carnarechinus clypeatus is a species of sea urchins of the Holasteroida order. It is the only species in the genus Carnarechinus.

This species was described on the basis of fragmentary and poorly preserved material from Philippines, hence its taxonomic status is still unclear. Molecular phylogeny indicates it may be a basal member of the Urechinina.
