= Epiparactis =

Scientific classification
- Domain: Eukaryota
- Kingdom: Animalia
- Phylum: Cnidaria
- Class: Hexacorallia
- Order: Actiniaria
- Family: Actinoscyphiidae
- Genus: Epiparactis; Carlgren, 1921
- Species: E. dubia

Binomial name
- Epiparactis dubia Carlgren, 1921

Genus of sea anemones

Epiparactis is a genus of sea anemones of the family Actinoscyphiidae. It currently includes only one species.

== Species ==
The following species are recognized:

- Epiparactis dubia Carlgren, 1921

== Distribution ==
This species was described from 1461 m depth at Ingolf Station 78, 60°37′N 27°52′W, SW of Iceland, North Atlantic.
