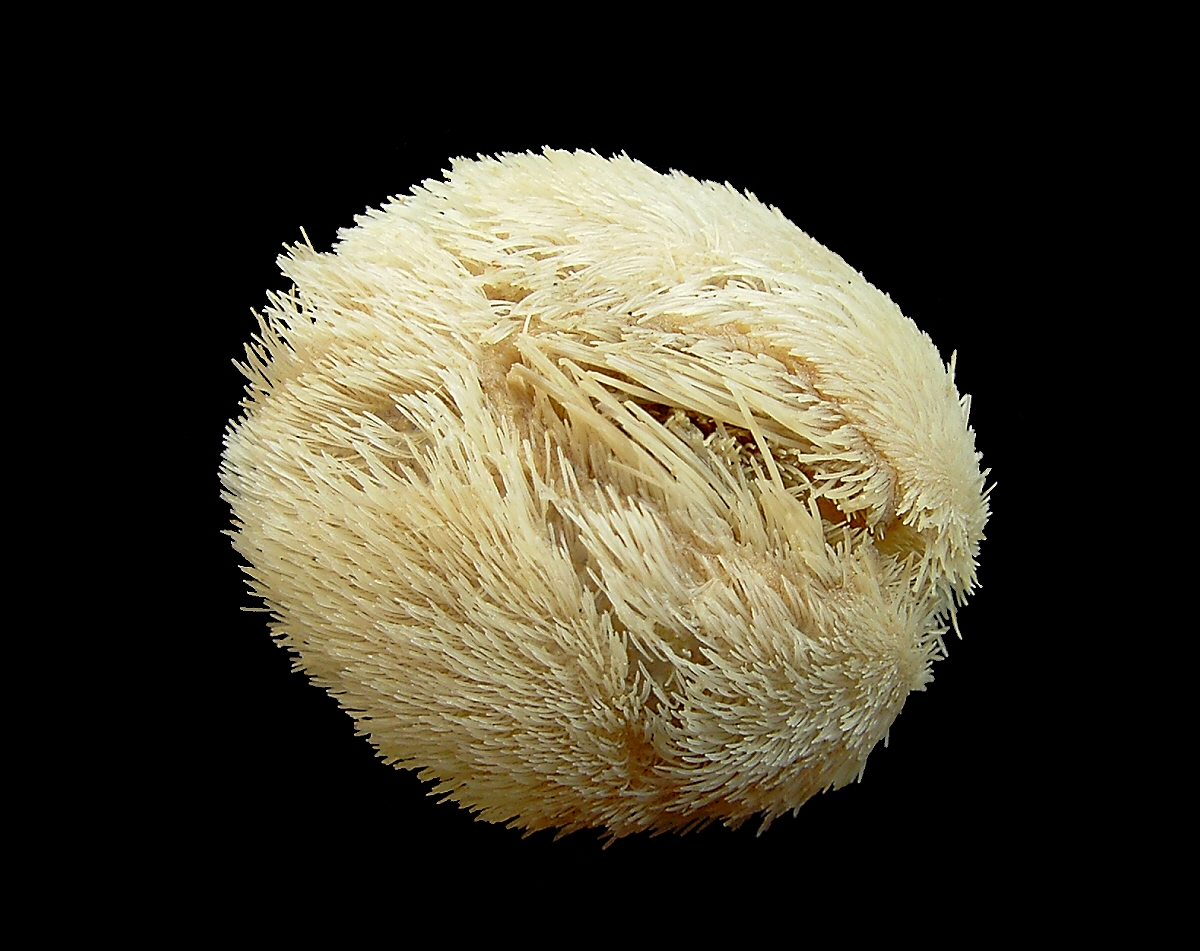
- Echinocardium cordatum

Scientific classification
- Kingdom: Animalia
- Phylum: Echinodermata
- Class: Echinoidea
- Subclass: Euechinoidea
- Infraclass: Irregularia; Latreille, 1825

Superorders
- Atelostomata; Neognathostomata

= Irregularia =

Irregularia Temporal range: Lower Jurassic–recent

Group of sea urchins

Irregularia is an extant infraclass of sea urchins that first appeared in the Lower Jurassic.

== Description and characteristics ==
These particular sea urchins are distinguished from other sea urchins by their irregular shape: the anus and often even the mouth are at the two poles of the test, creating a bilateral symmetry instead of the classical 5-fold symmetry of echinoderms. The group includes the well known heart urchins, as well as flattened sand dollars, sea biscuits and some other forms. Most of them live inside the sediment, moving in thanks to their particular spines, and feed on its organic fraction.

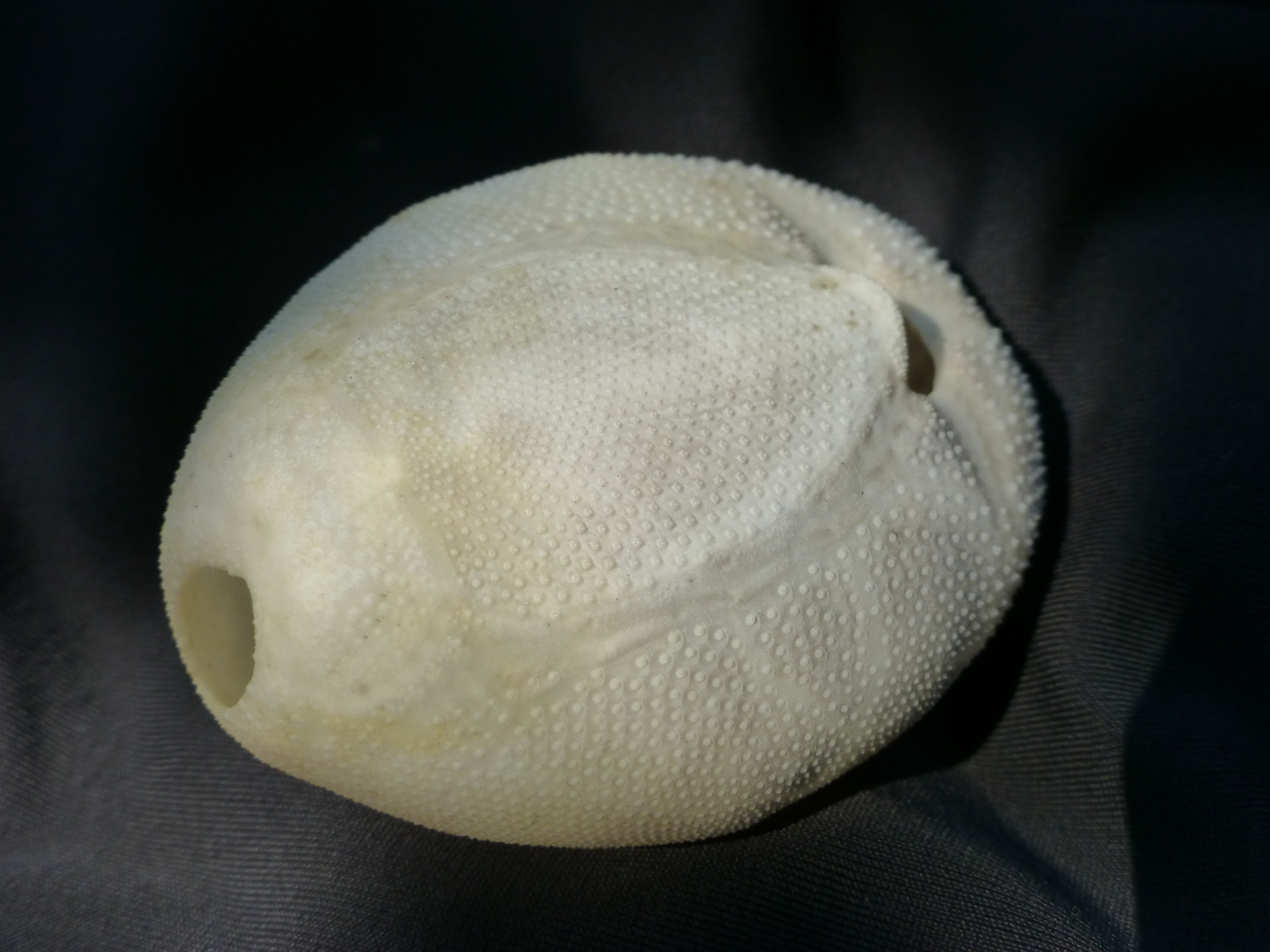
Test of a spatangoid (oral face): the mouth is on the right and the anus on the left.

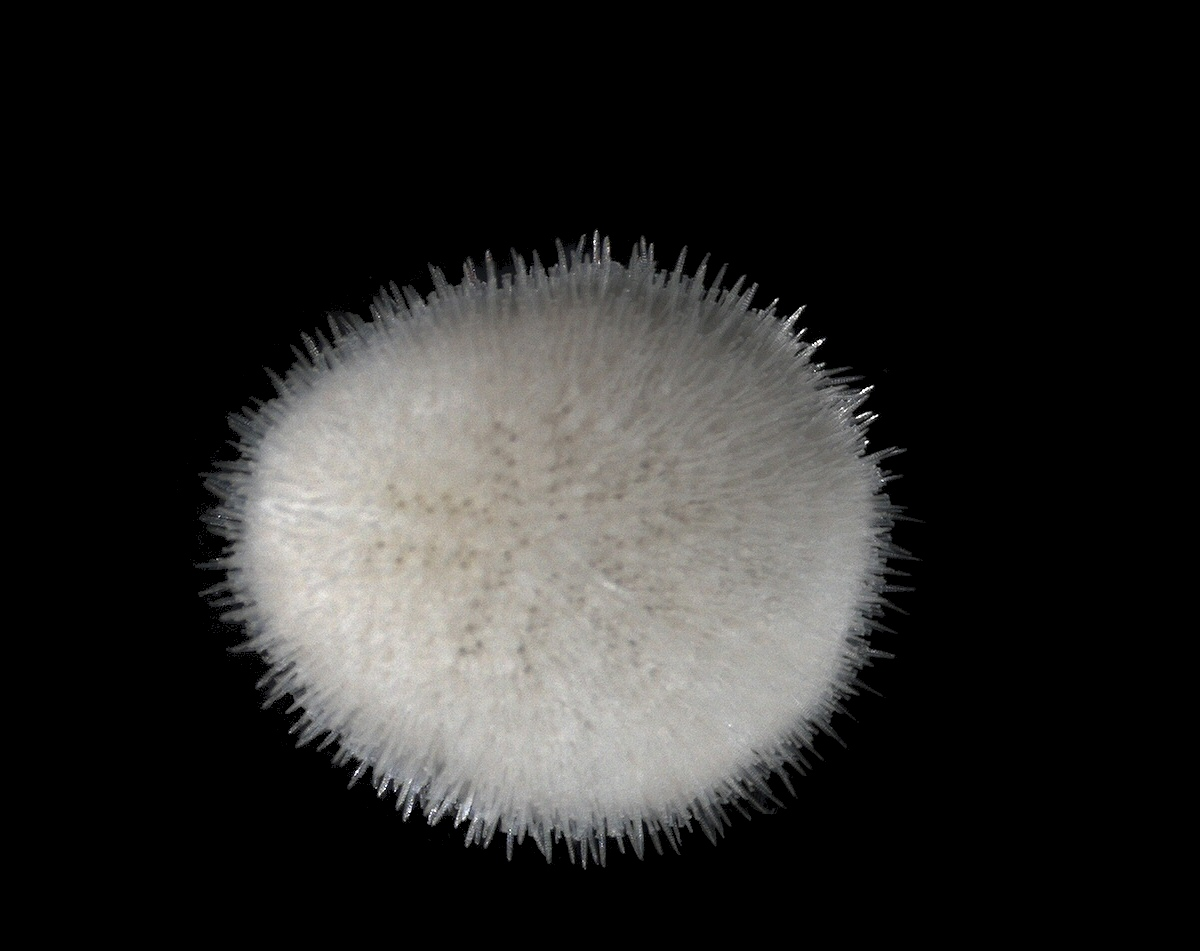
Echinocyamus pusillus.

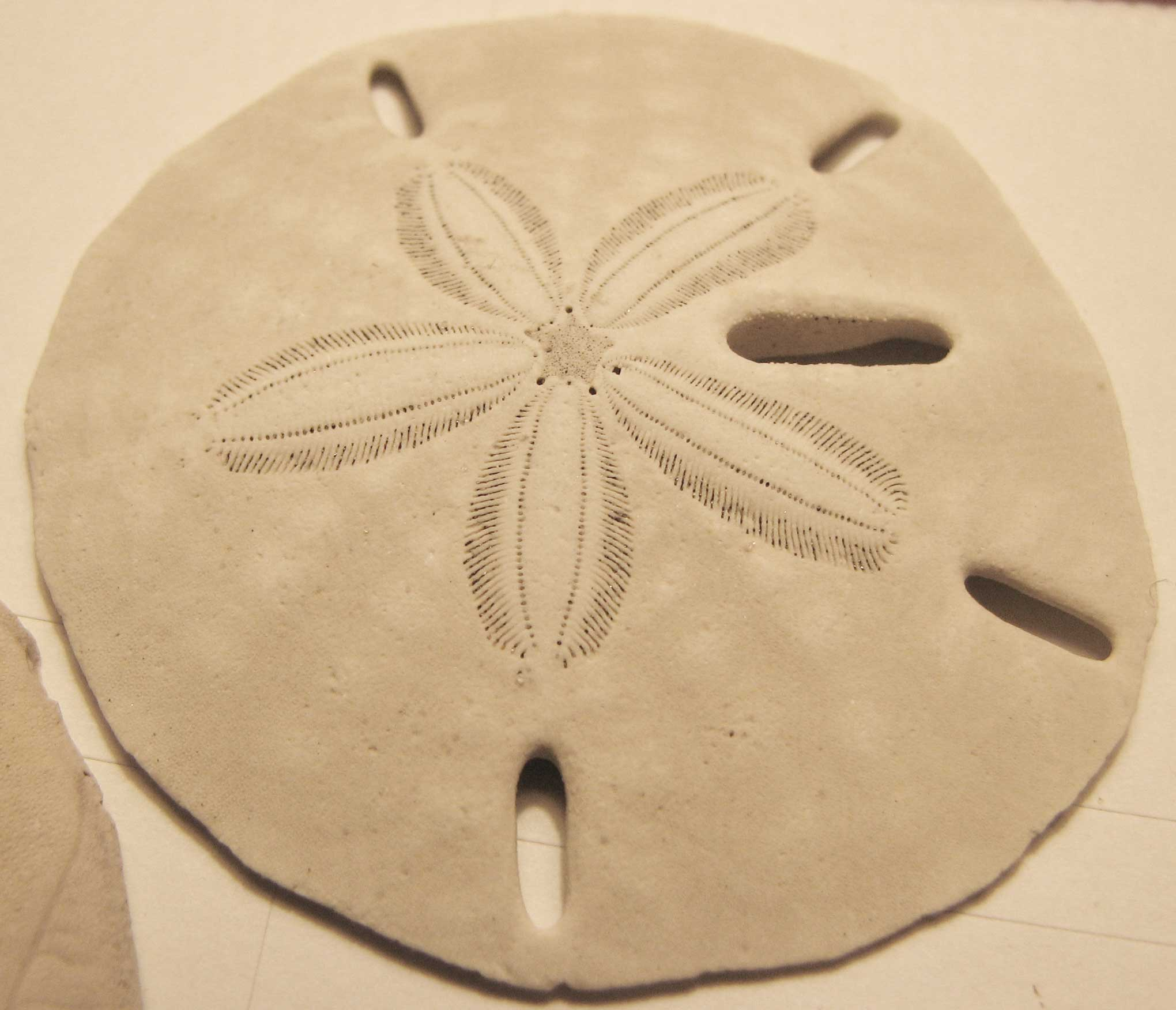
Test of a Mellita quinquiesperforata.

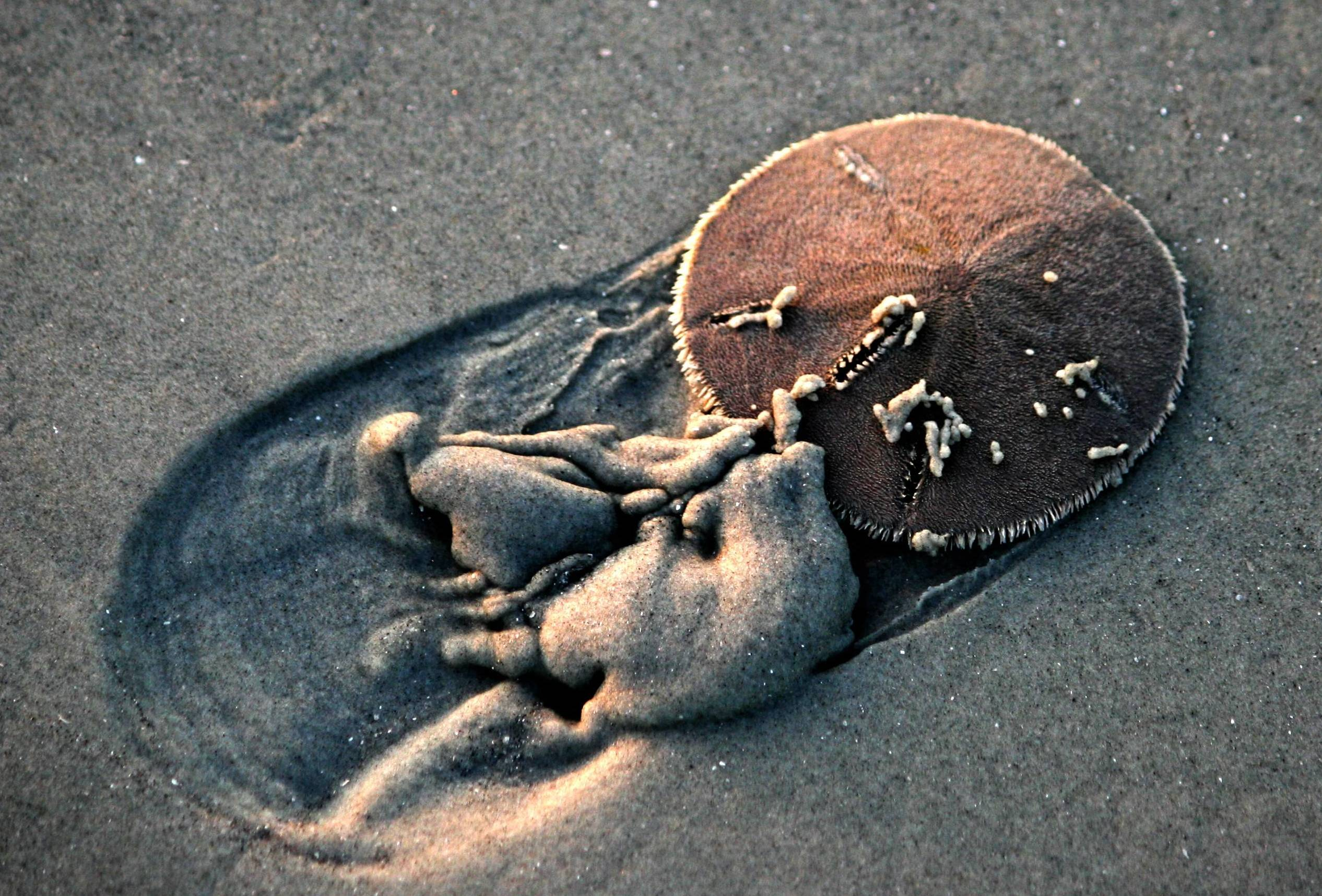
A "sand dollar" in its environment.
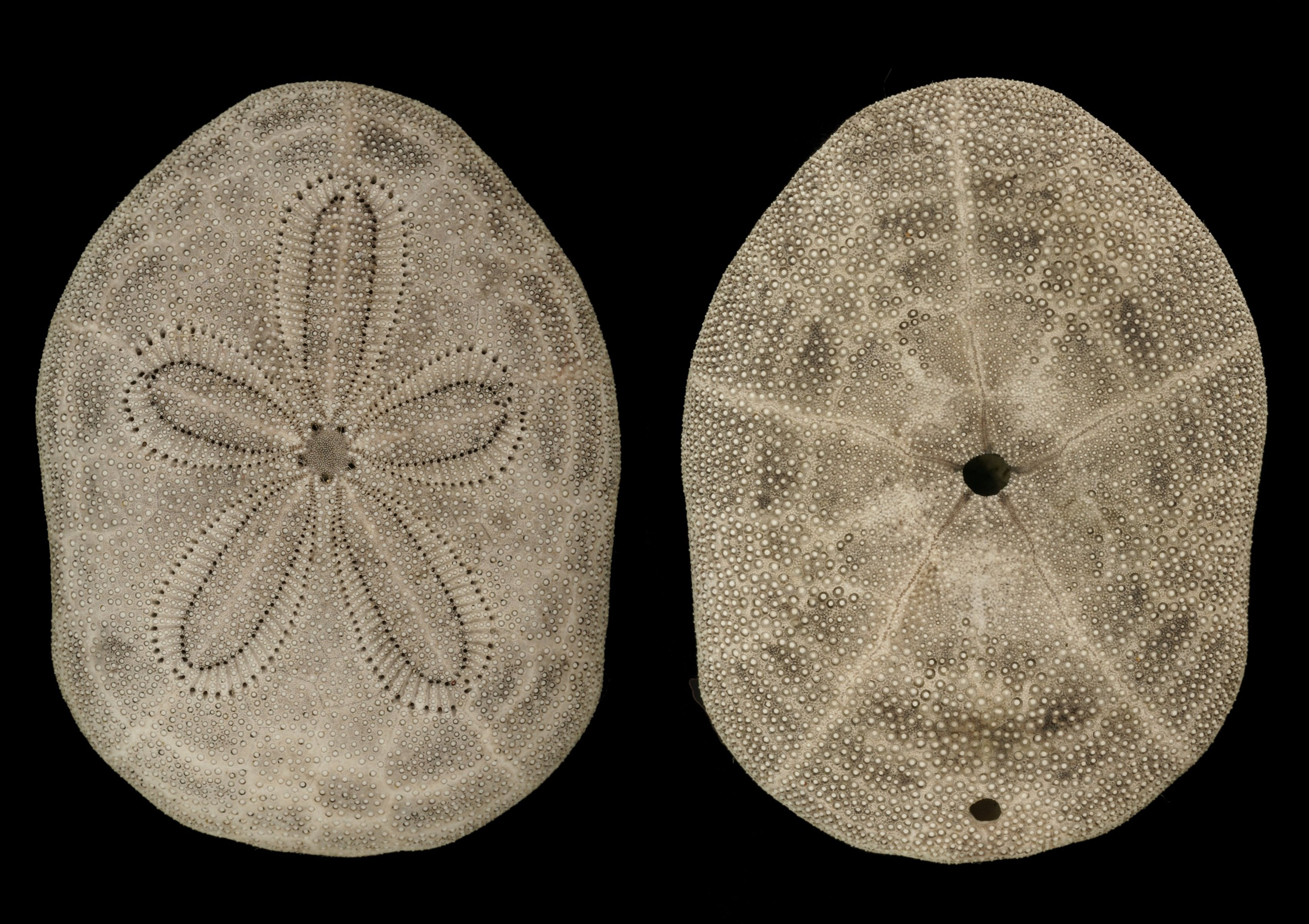
Clypeaster reticulatus (family Clypeasteridae).

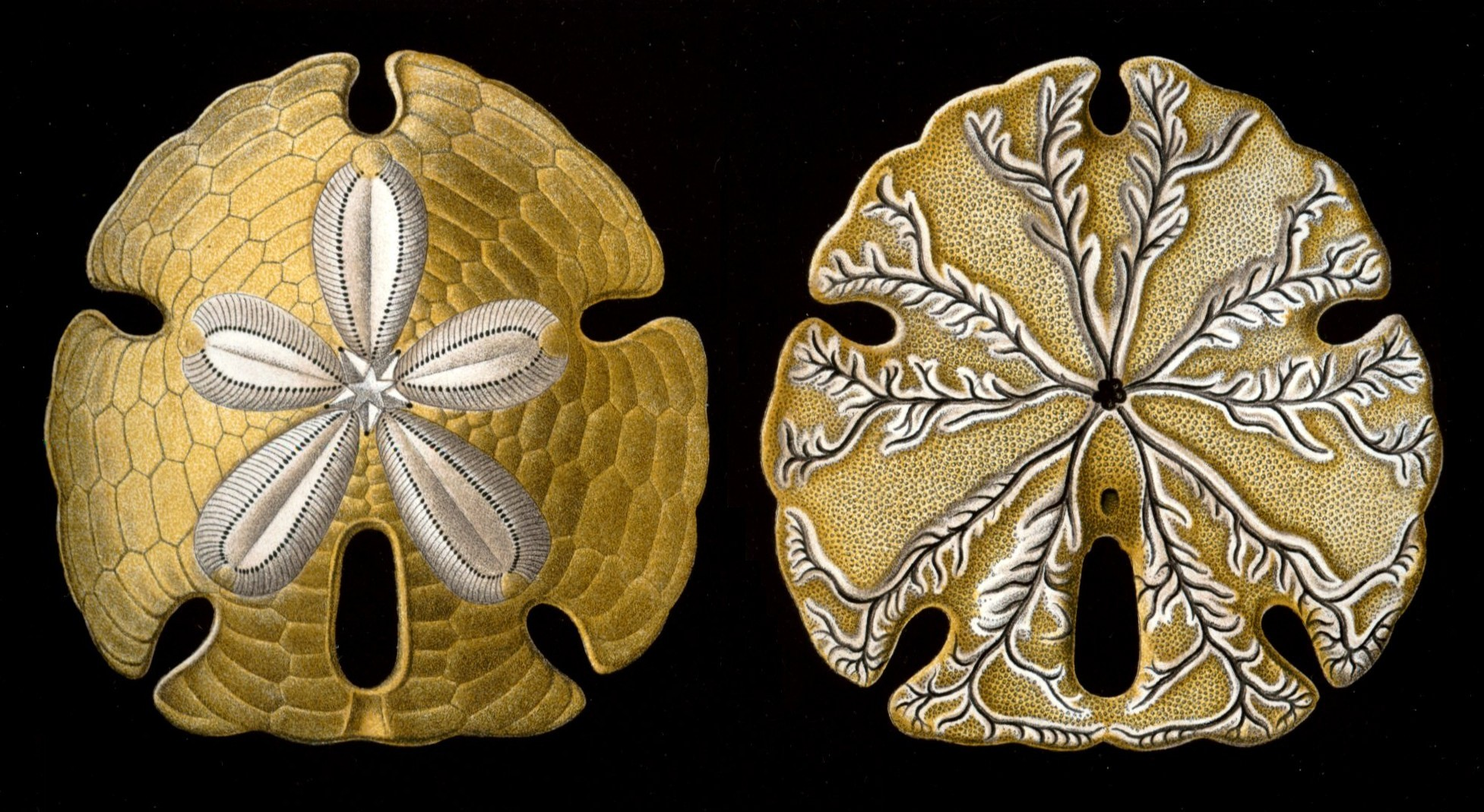
Encope emarginata (aboral and oral faces) drawn by Ernst Haeckel (1904).

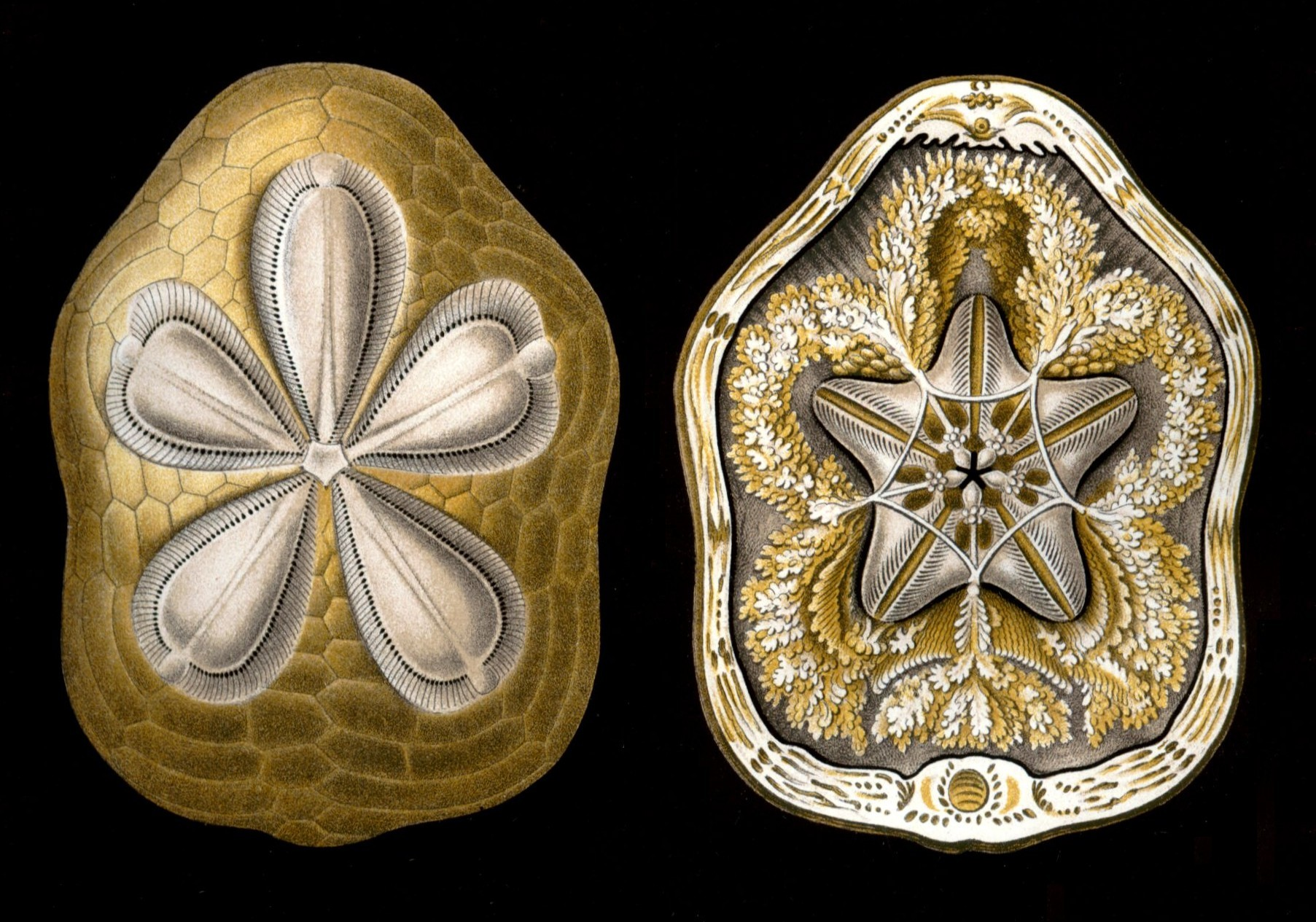
Clypeaster rosaceus, ibid.

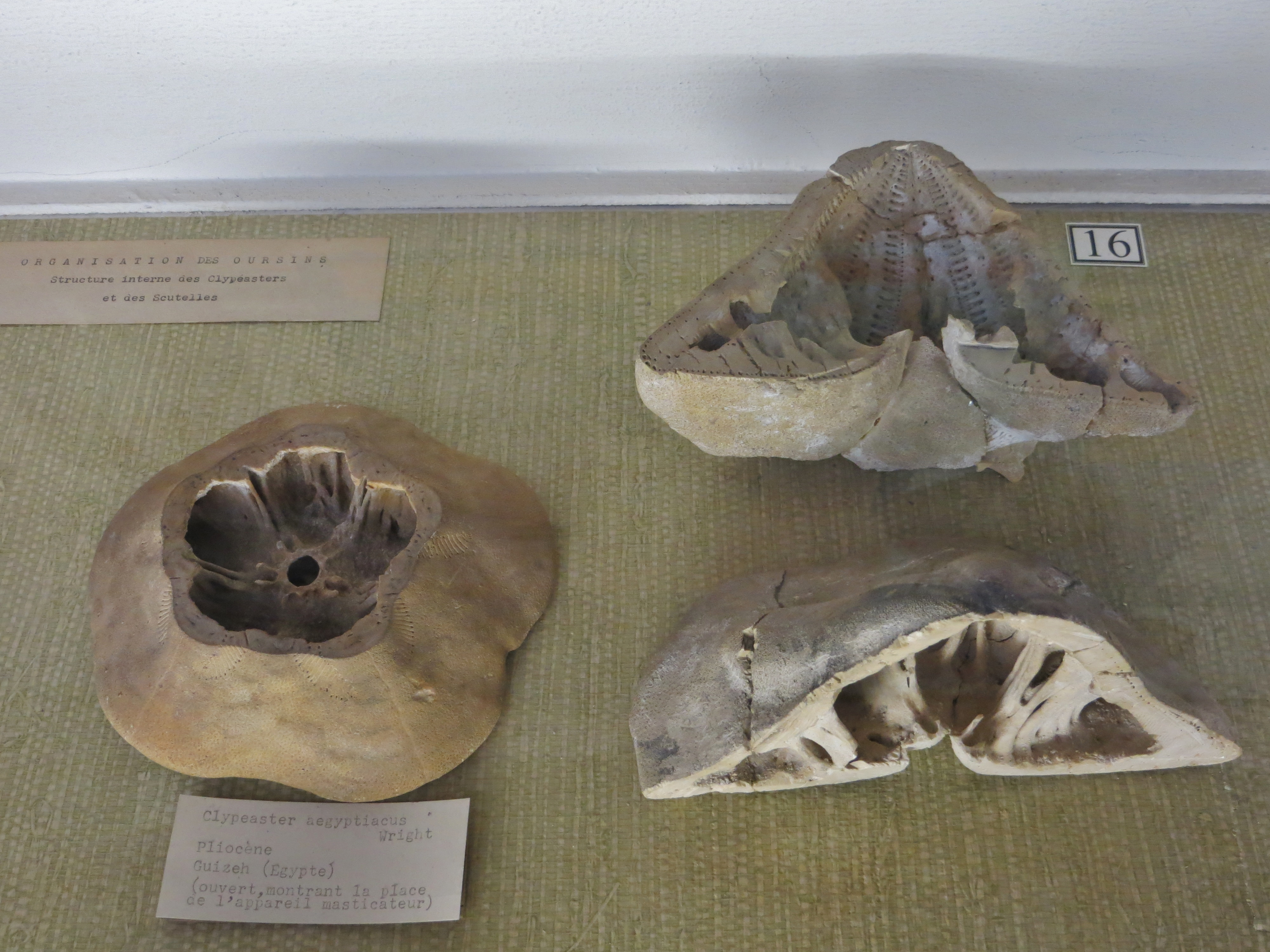
Many slices of Clypeaster aegypticus, showing buttresses and pillars.

== Taxonomy ==
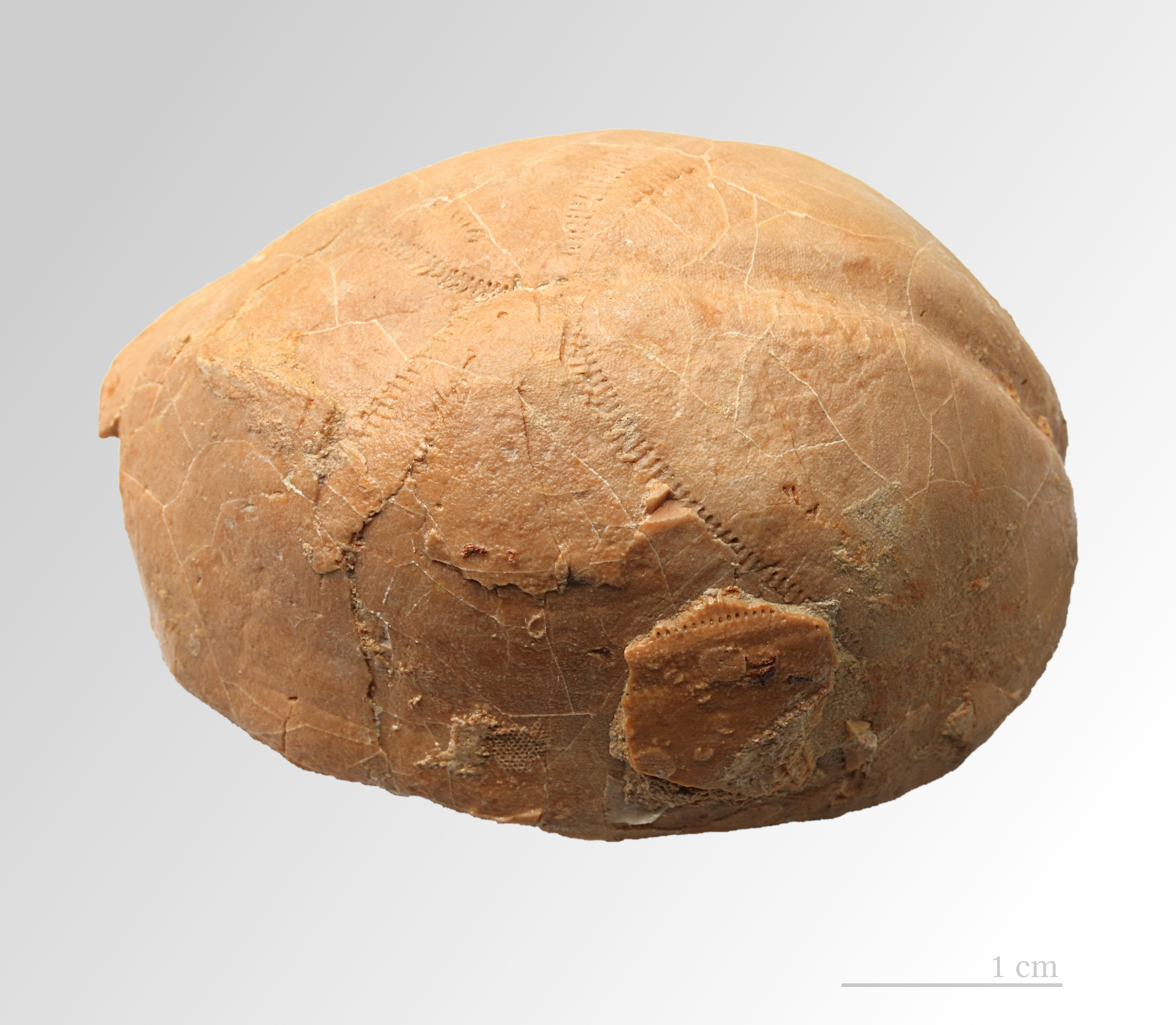
Fossil of an Hemipneustes pyrenaicus (Holasteroida).

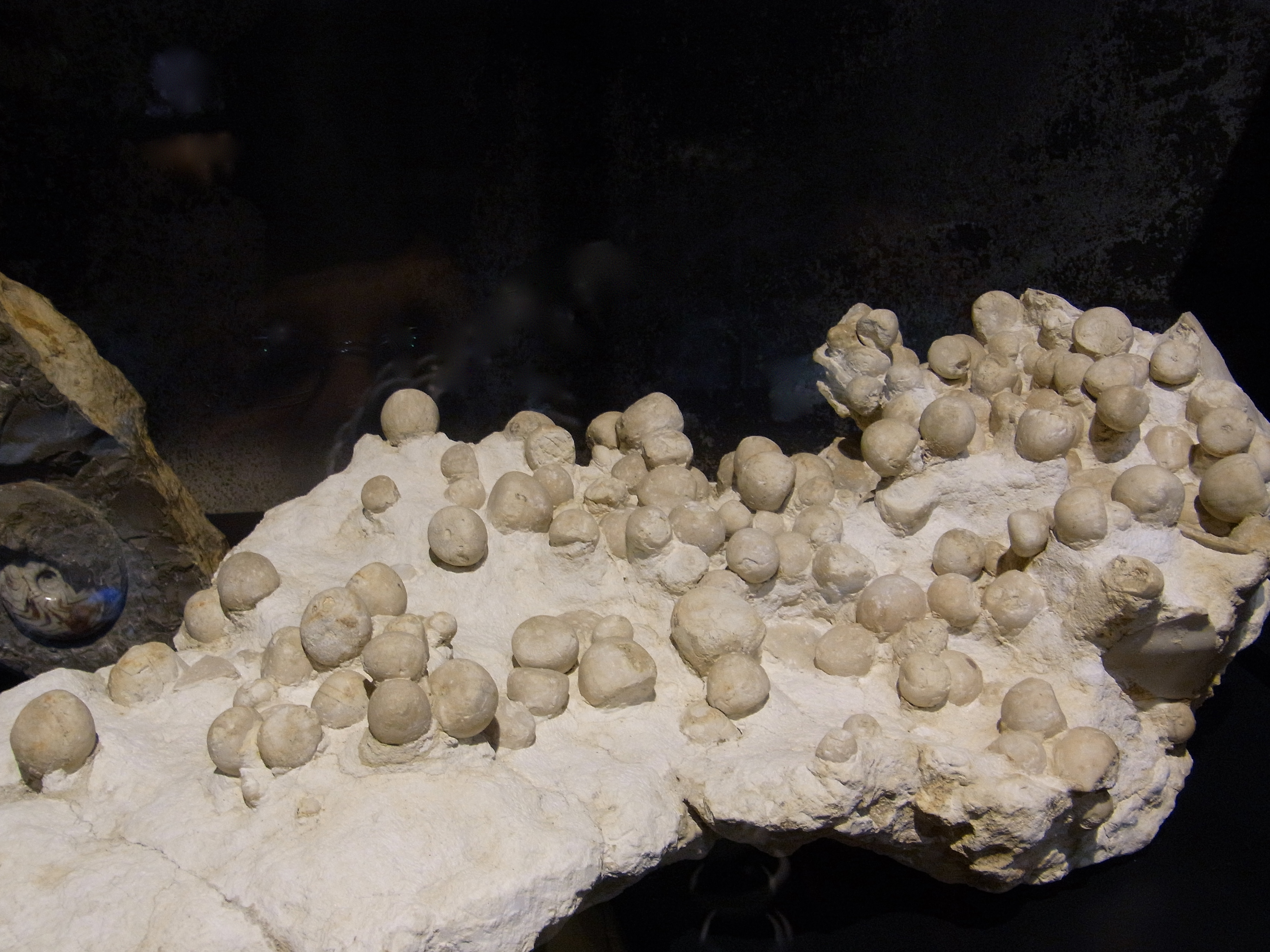
Fossil of a Conulus subroundatus (Echinoneoida).

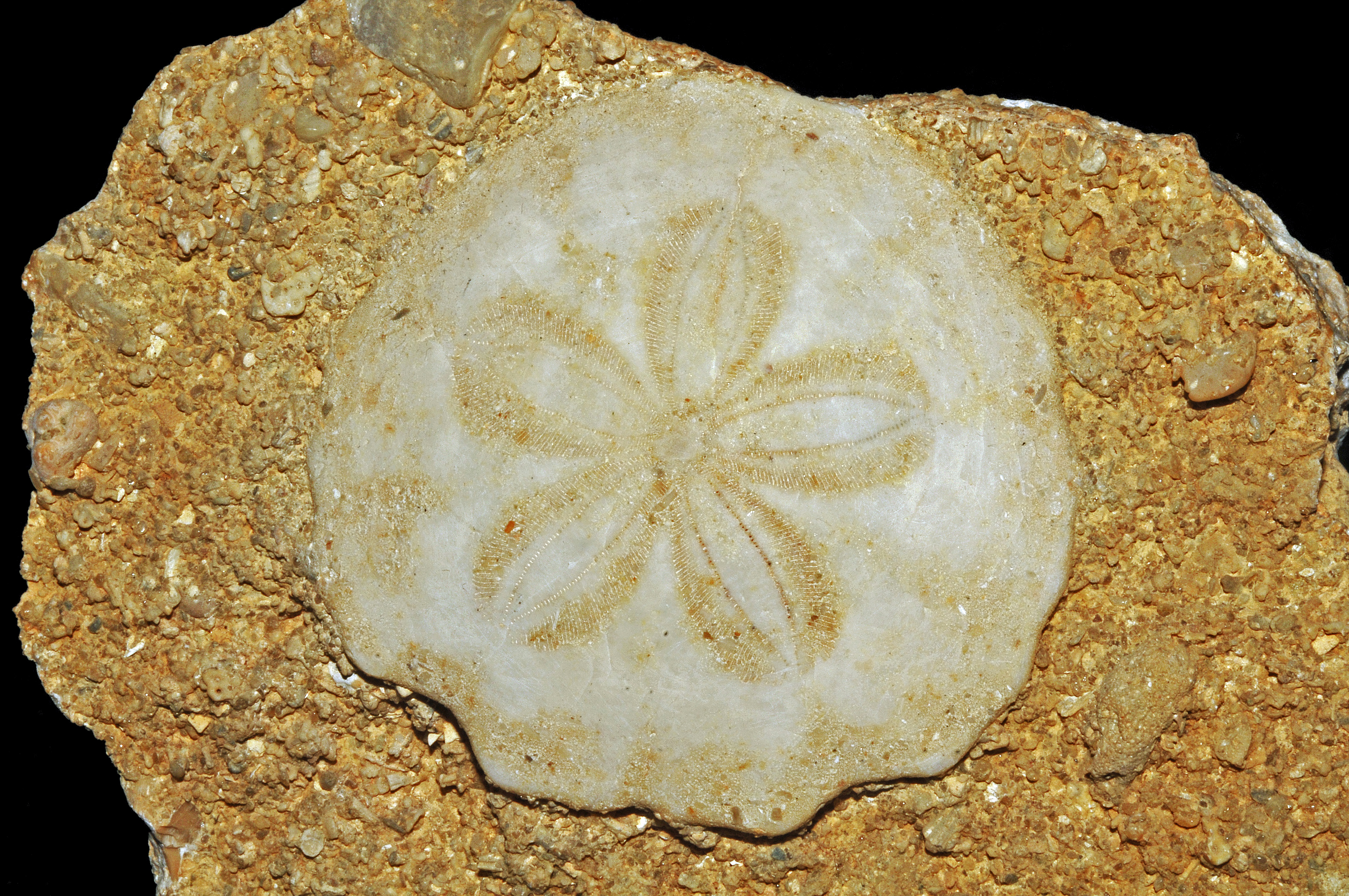
Fossil of a Scutella subrotunda (Clypeasteroida).

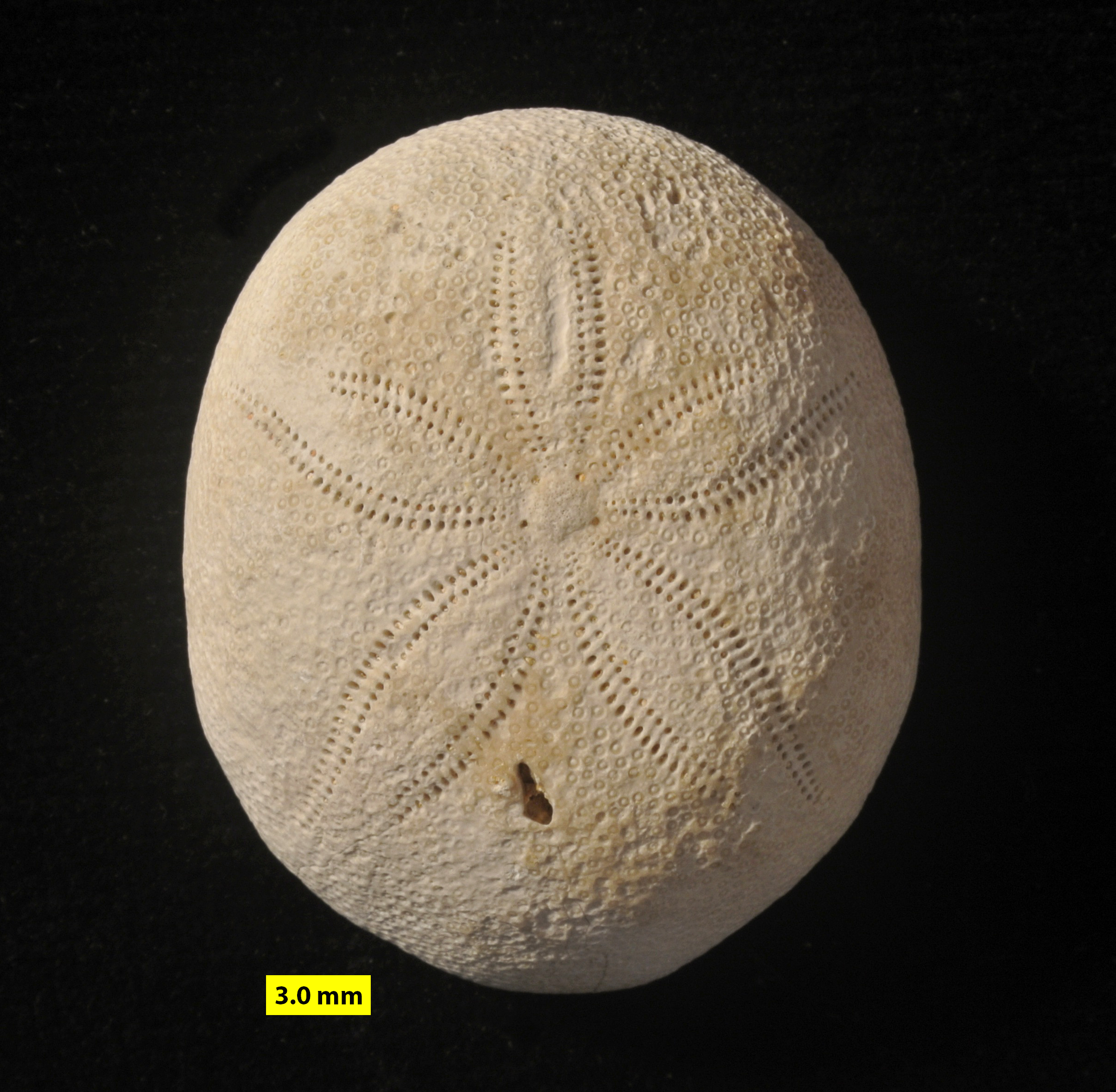
Echinolampas ovalis, Middle Eocene, Civrac-en-Médoc, France.

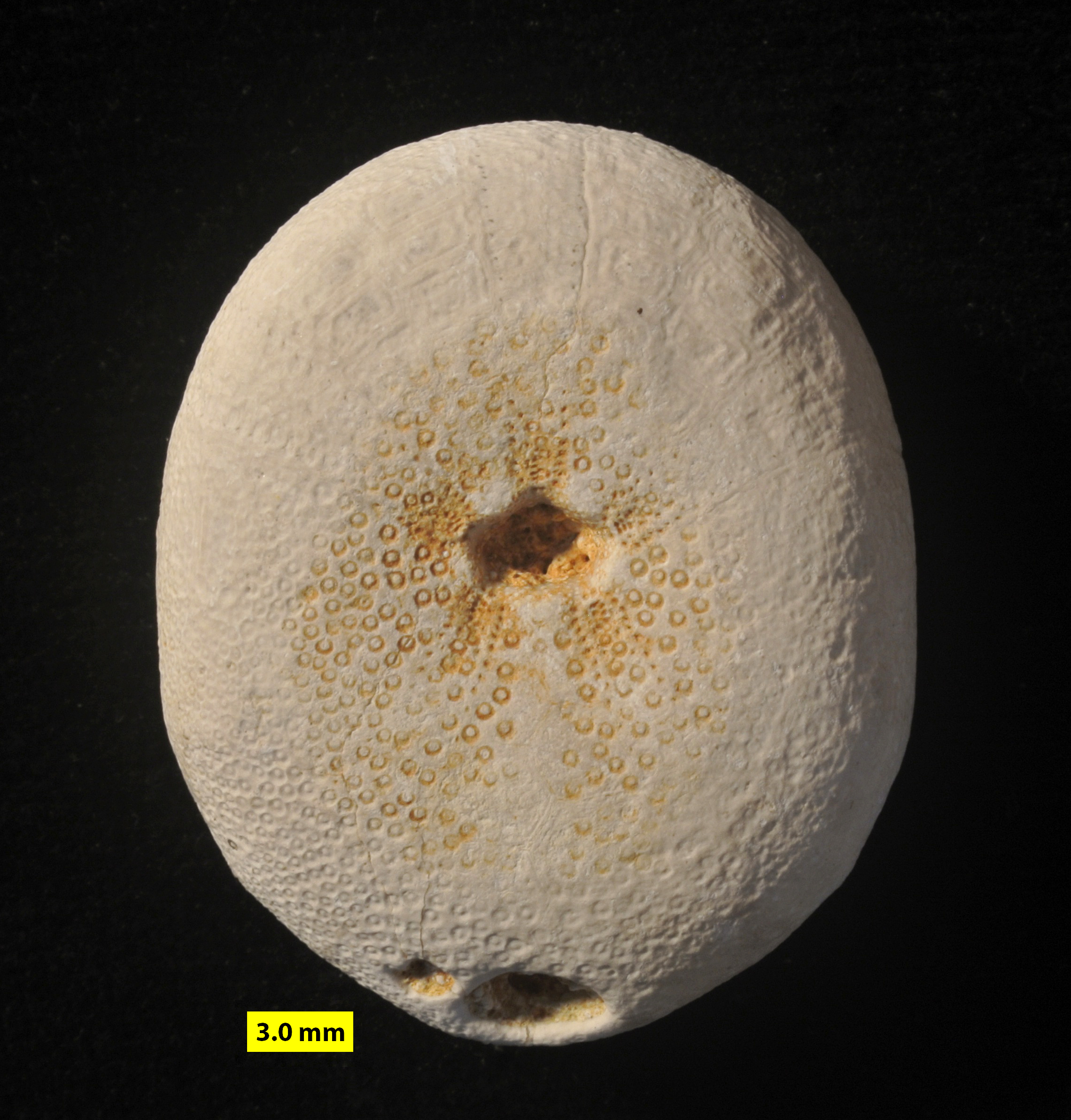
Echinolampas ovalis, Middle Eocene, Civrac-en-Médoc, France; oral surface.

- super-order Atelostomata
  - fossil family Acrolusiidae Mintz, 1968 †
  - fossil family Collyritidae d'Orbigny, 1853 †
  - fossil family Disasteridae Gras, 1848 †
  - order Holasteroida
  - order Spatangoida
  - fossil family Tithoniidae Mintz, 1968 †
- fossil genus Atlasaster Lambert, 1931 †
- fossil family Desorellidae Lambert, 1911a †
- order Echinoneoida
- fossil family Galeropygidae Lambert, 1911a †
- fossil genus Grasia Michelin, 1854 †
- fossil order Holectypoida †
- fossil family Menopygidae Lambert, 1911 †
- fossil genus Mesodiadema Neumayr, 1889 †
- super-order Neognathostomata
  - familia Apatopygidae Kier, 1962
  - fossil family Archiaciidae Cotteau & Triger, 1869 †
  - order Cassiduloida
  - order Clypeasteroida
  - fossil family Clypeidae Lambert, 1898 †
  - fossil family Clypeolampadidae Kier, 1962 †
  - order Echinolampadoida
  - fossil family Nucleolitidae L. Agassiz & Desor, 1847 †
  - fossil family Pygaulidae Lambert, 1905 †
  - fossil genus Pygolampas Saucède, Dudicourt & Courville, 2012 †
- fossil order Oligopygoida Kier, 1967 †
- fossil family Pygasteridae Lambert, 1900 †
- fossil family Pygorhytidae Lambert, 1909b †
