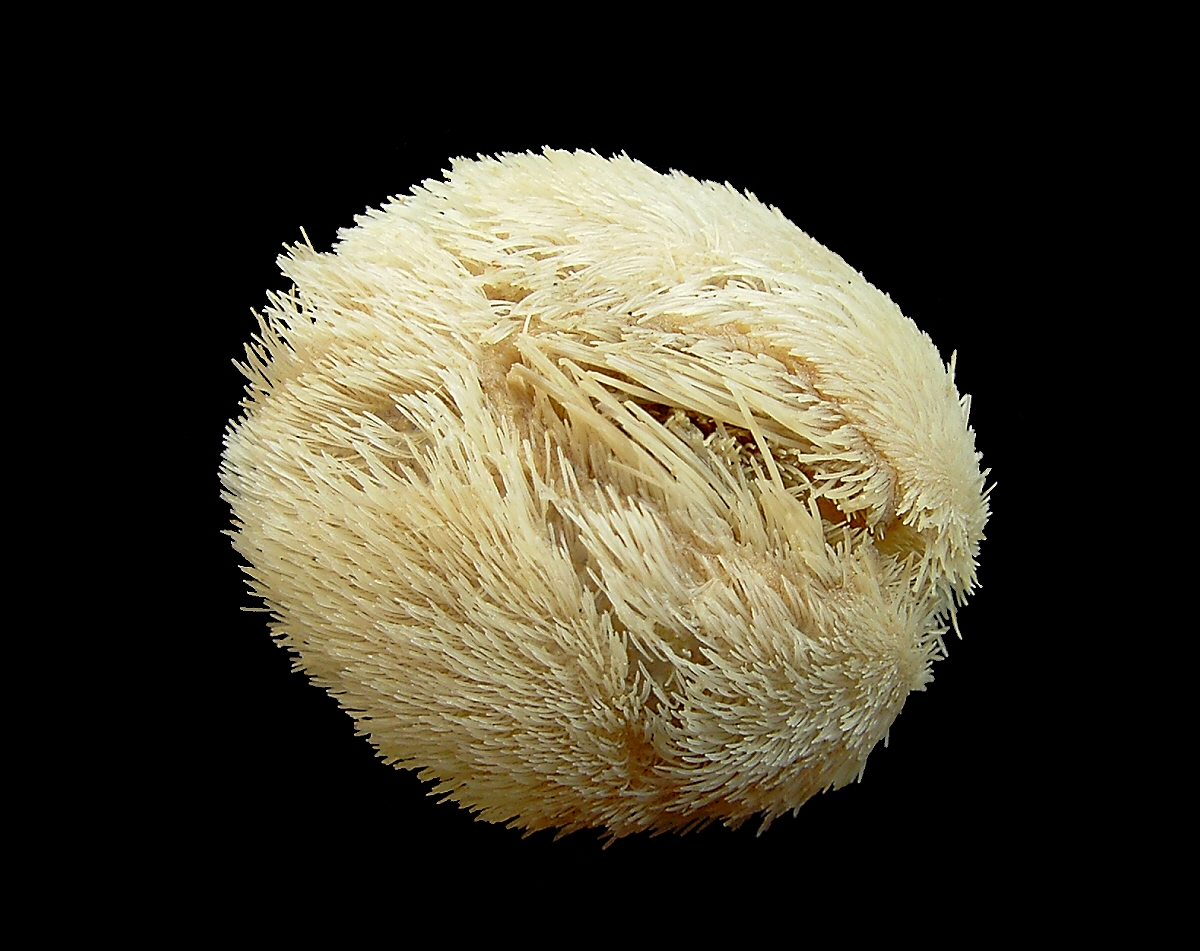
- Echinocardium cordatum

Scientific classification
- Kingdom: Animalia
- Phylum: Echinodermata
- Class: Echinoidea
- Subclass: Euechinoidea
- Infraclass: Irregularia
- Superorder: Atelostomata von Zittel, 1879

Orders
- Holasteroida; Spatangoida

= Atelostomata =

Atelostomata Temporal range: Lower Jurassic–recent

Suborder of sea urchins

The Atelostomata are a type of sea urchins. They are distinguished from other sea urchins by their irregular shape and the absence of a feeding lantern. The group includes the well known heart urchins, as well as some less familiar and extinct forms.

== List of orders ==
- Family † Acrolusiidae Mintz, 1968
- Family † Collyritidae d'Orbigny, 1853
- Family † Disasteridae Gras, 1848
- order Holasteroida (Durham & Melville, 1957)
- order Spatangoida (L. Agassiz, 1840)
- Family † Tithoniidae Mintz, 1968
