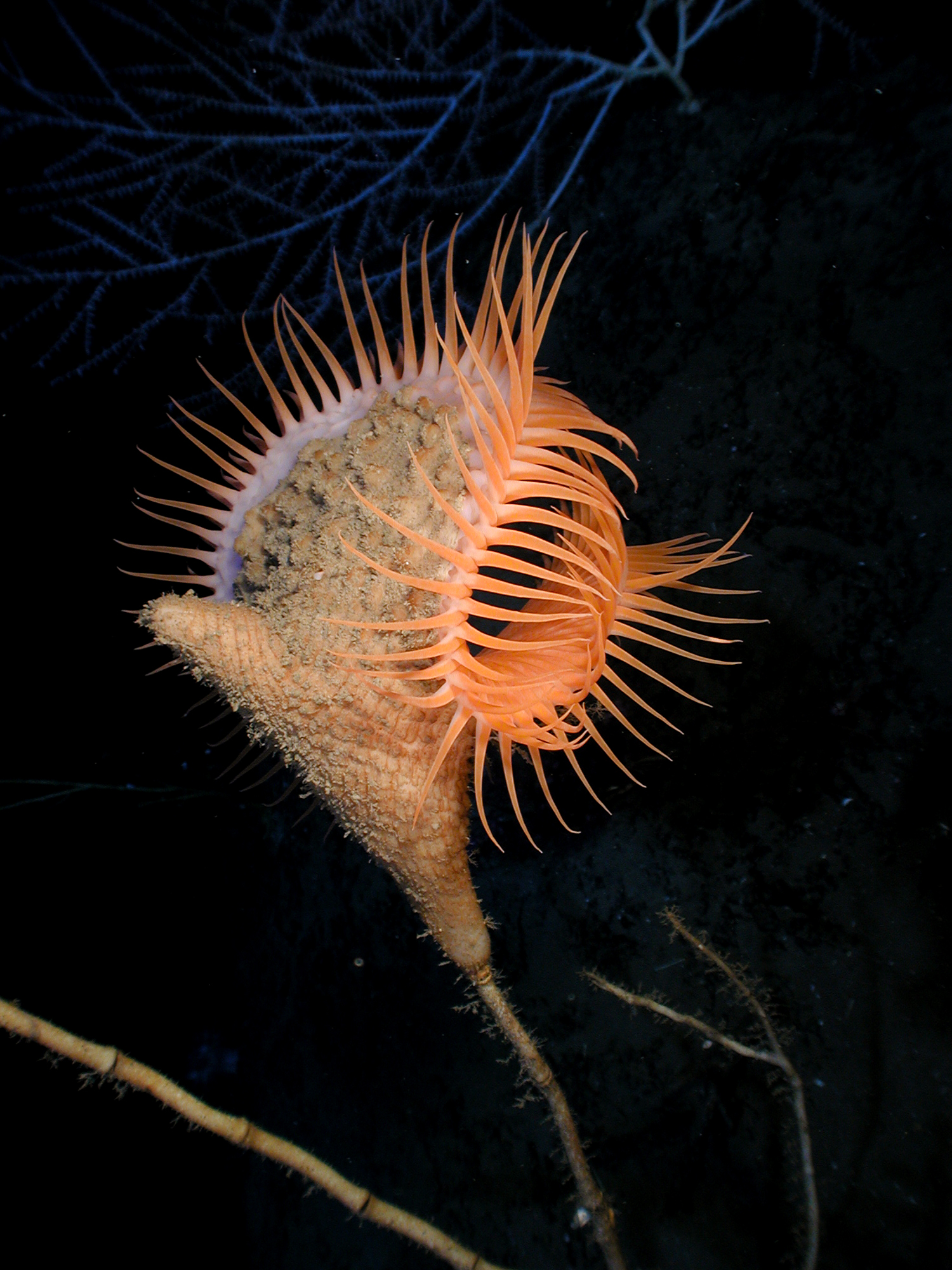
- Actinoscyphia aurelia

Scientific classification
- Domain: Eukaryota
- Kingdom: Animalia
- Phylum: Cnidaria
- Class: Hexacorallia
- Order: Actiniaria
- Family: Actinoscyphiidae
- Genus: Actinoscyphia; Stephenson, 1920

= Actinoscyphia =

Genus of sea anemones

Actinoscyphia is a genus of sea anemones of the family Actinoscyphiidae.

== Species ==
The following species are recognized:

- Venus flytrap sea anemone (Actinoscyphia aurelia (Stephenson, 1918))
- Actinoscyphia groendyki Eash-Loucks & Fautin, 2012
- Actinoscyphia plebeia (McMurrich, 1893)
- Actinoscyphia saginata (Verrill, 1882)
- Actinoscyphia verrilli (Gravier, 1918)
