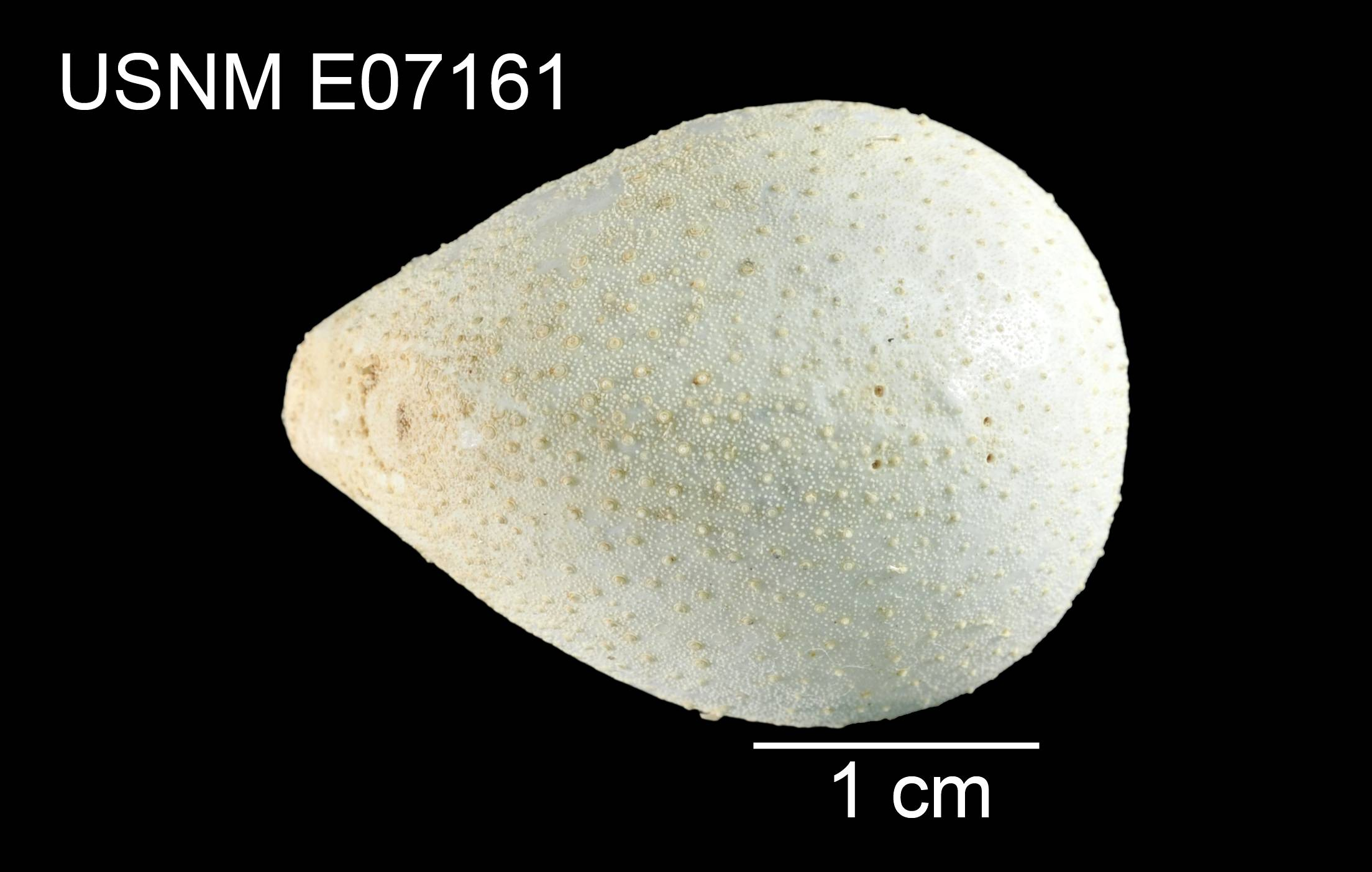
- Plexechinus spectabilis

Scientific classification
- Kingdom: Animalia
- Phylum: Echinodermata
- Class: Echinoidea
- Order: Holasteroida
- Family: Plexechinidae; Mooi & David, 1996
- Genus: Plexechinus; Agassiz, 1898

= Plexechinus =

Genus of sea urchins

Plexechinus is a genus of echinoderms belonging to the monotypic family Plexechinidae.

The genus has almost cosmopolitan distribution.

Species:

- Plexechinus aoteanus (McKnight, 1974)
- Plexechinus cinctus Agassiz, 1898
- Plexechinus hirsutus Mortensen, 1905
- Plexechinus parvus (Mironov, 1978)
- Plexechinus planus (Mironov, 1978)
- Plexechinus spectabilis Mortensen, 1948
- Plexechinus sulcatus David & Mooi, 2000
