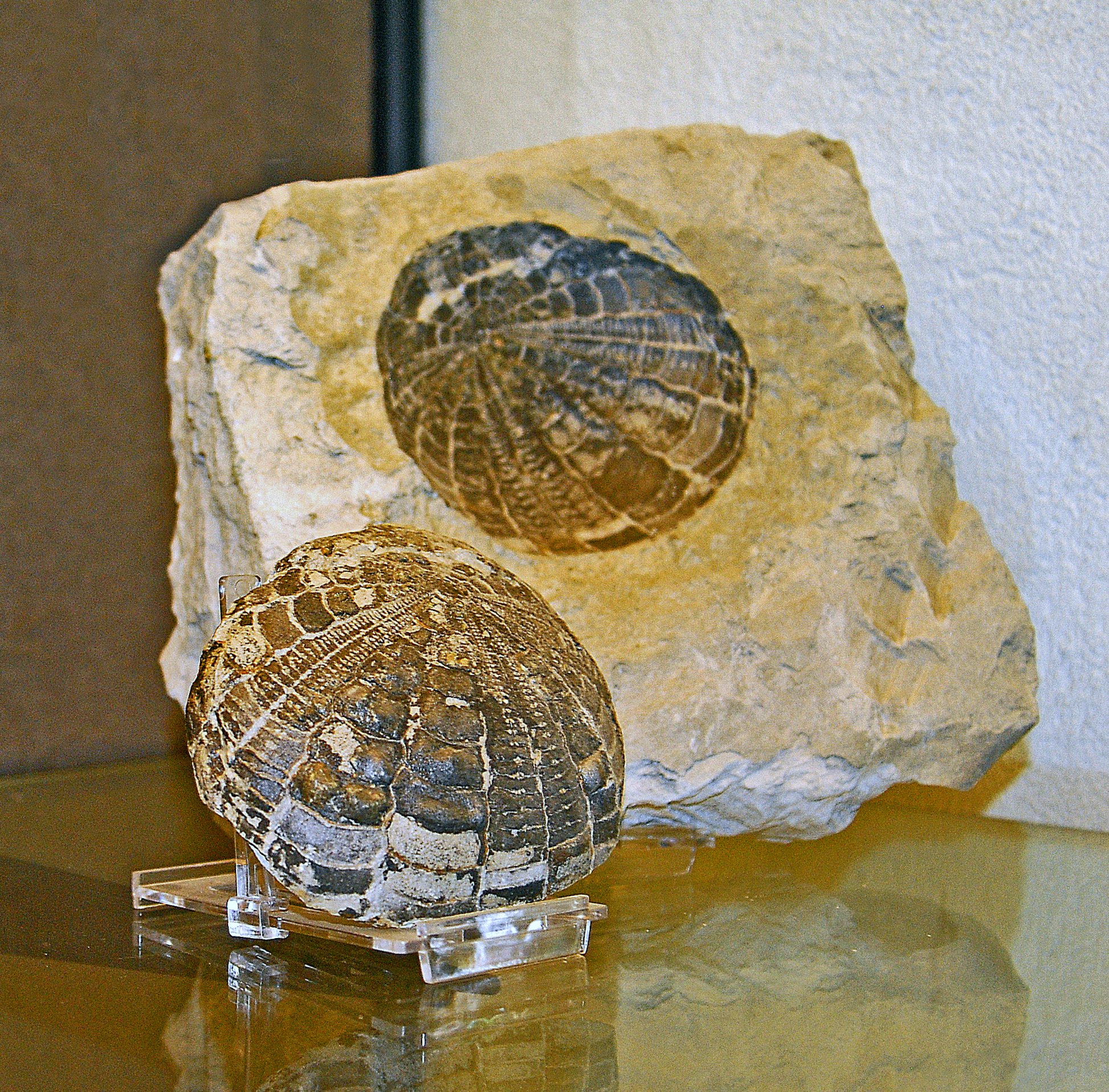
- Fossils of Toxopatagus from Alba (Italy)

Scientific classification
- Kingdom: Animalia
- Phylum: Echinodermata
- Class: Echinoidea
- Order: Holasteroida
- Family: †Hemipneustidae
- Genus: †Toxopatagus; Pomel 1883

= Toxopatagus =

Extinct genus of sea urchins

Toxopatagus is an extinct genus of sea urchins.
