= Tithoniidae =

Scientific classification
- Kingdom: Animalia
- Phylum: Echinodermata
- Class: Echinoidea
- Superorder: Atelostomata
- Family: †Tithoniidae; Mintz, 1968

Extinct family of sea urchins

Tithoniidae is an extinct family of sea urchins.
