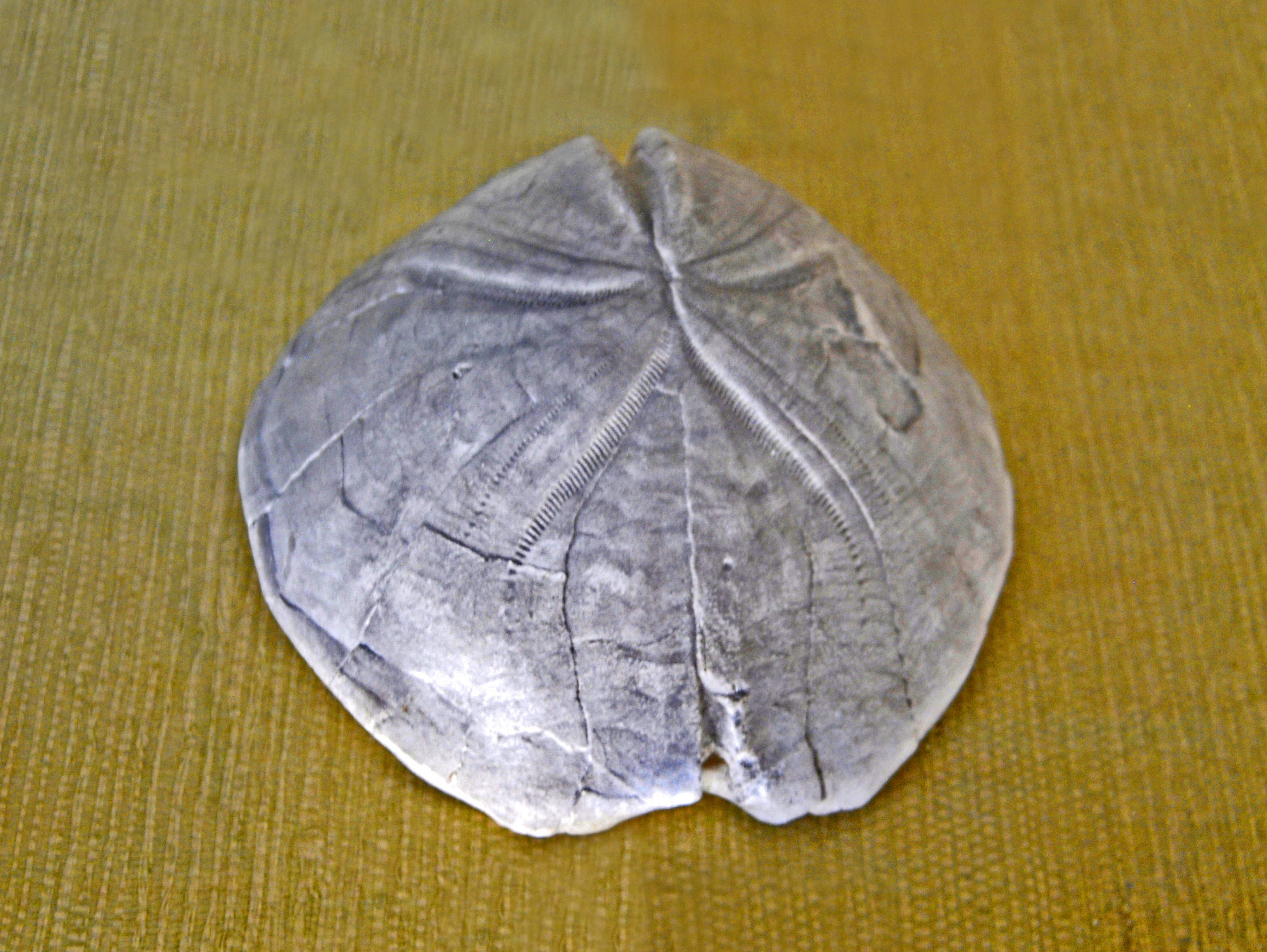
- Fossil of Hemipneustus oculatus from Belgium, on display at Galerie de paléontologie et d'anatomie comparée in Paris

Scientific classification
- Kingdom: Animalia
- Phylum: Echinodermata
- Class: Echinoidea
- Order: Holasteroida
- Family: †Holasteridae
- Genus: †Hemipneustes; L. Agassiz, 1836

= Hemipneustes =

Hemipneustes Temporal range: Maastrichtian

Extinct genus of sea urchins

Hemipneustes is an extinct genus of sea urchins belonging to the family Holasteridae.

These semi-infaunal detritivores lived during the Upper Cretaceous period, from 70.6 to 66.043 million years ago. Fossils of this genus have been found in the sediments of Netherlands, Belgium, Bulgaria, India, Iran, Oman and Spain.

== Description ==
Hemipneustes is a quite large sea urchin with a high-domed profile and a well-defined anterior sulcus.

== List of species ==
- Hemipneustes africanus Deshayes In Agassiz & Desor, 1847 †
- Hemipneustes arabicus Ali, 1989 †
- Hemipneustes arnaudi Cotteau, 1892
- Hemipneustes compressus Noetling, 1897 †
- Hemipneustes cotteaui Lambert in Peron, 1887 †
- Hemipneustes delettrei Peron & Gauthier †
- Hemipneustes leymeriei Hébert, 1875 †
- Hemipneustes nicklesi Vidal, 1921 †
- Hemipneustes oculatus Cotteau, 1892 †
- Hemipneustes perrieri Cottreau, 1935 †
- Hemipneustes persicus Cotteau & Gauthier, 1895 †
- Hemipneustes pyrenaicus Hebert, 1875 †
- Hemipneustes sardanyolae Vidal, 1921 †
- Hemipneustes striatoradiatus (Leske, 1778) †
- Hemipneustes zuffardii Checchia-Rispoli, 1921 †
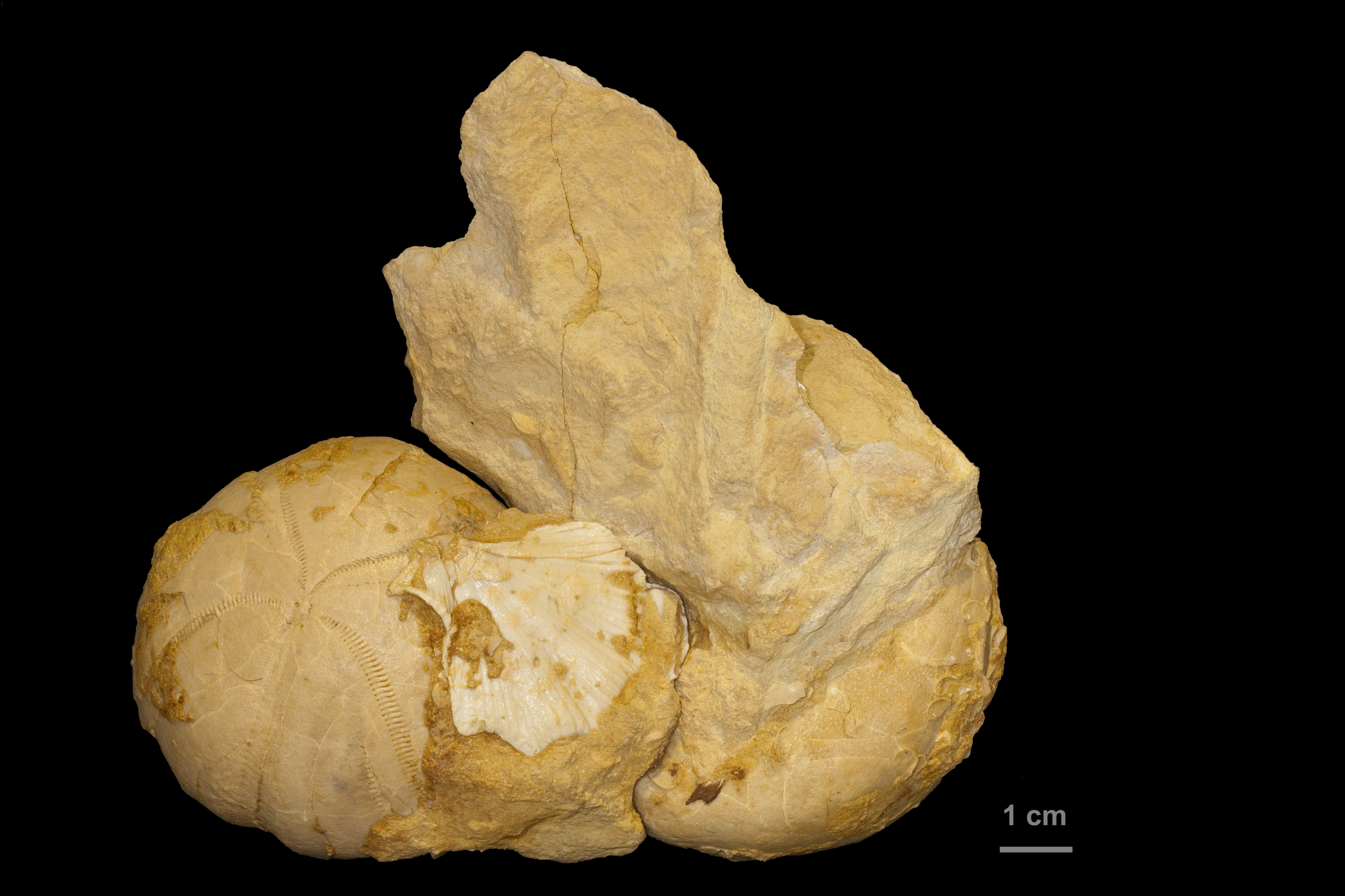
Hemipneustes leymeriei

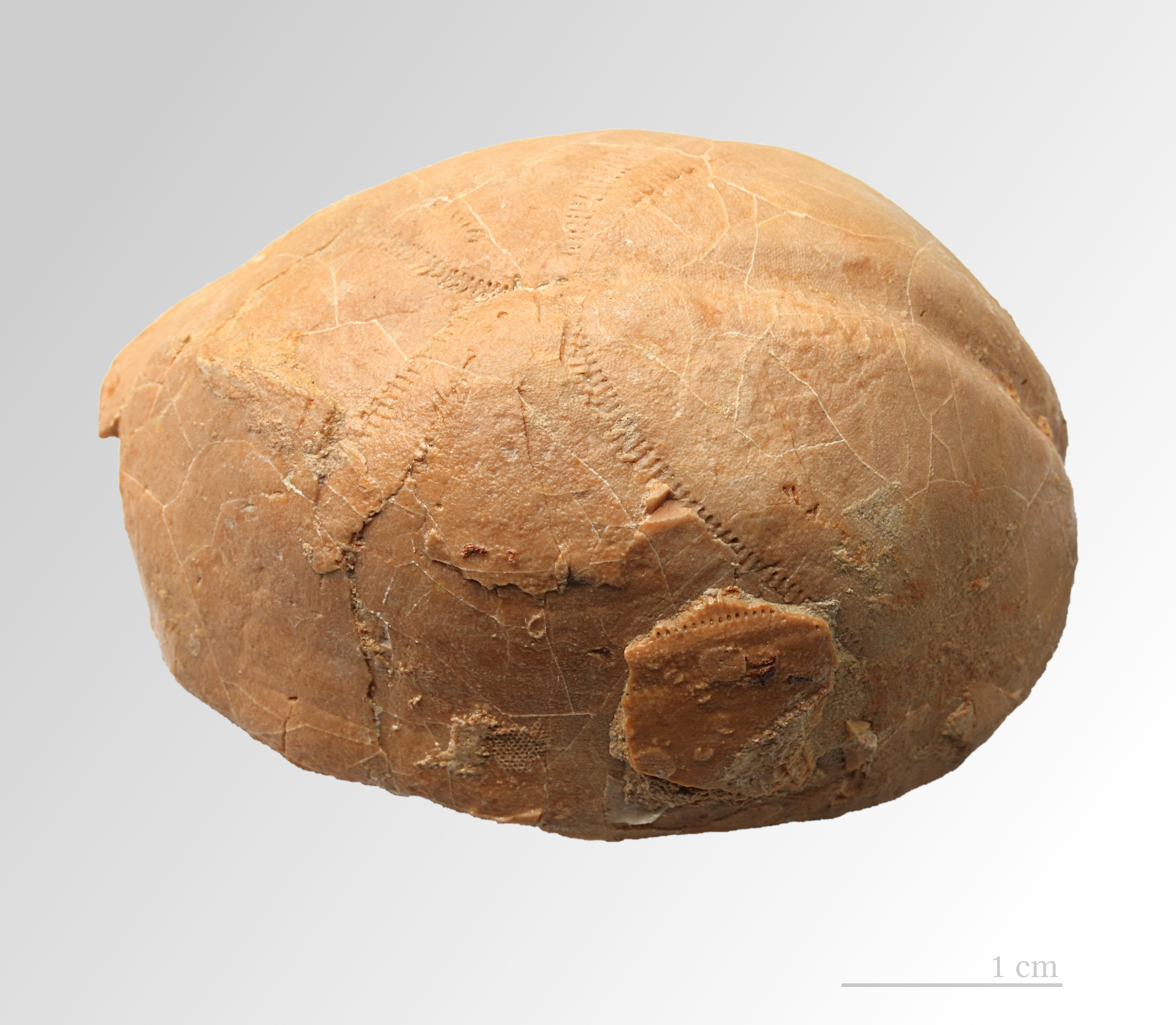
Hemipneustes pyrenaicus
