= Urechinidae =

Scientific classification
- Kingdom: Animalia
- Phylum: Echinodermata
- Class: Echinoidea
- Order: Holasteroida
- Family: Urechinidae; Duncan, 1889

Family of sea urchins

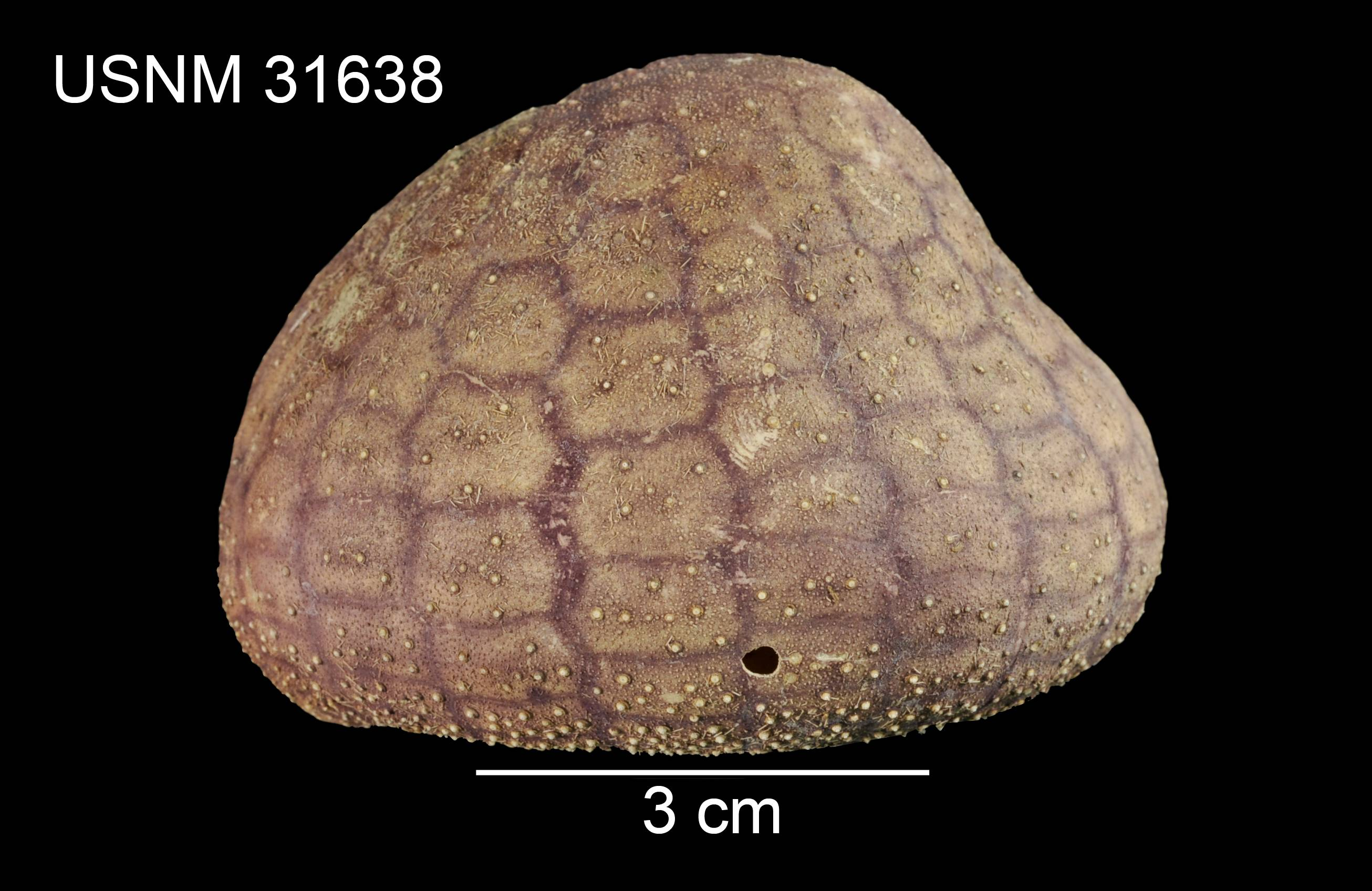
Urechinus reticulatus

Urechinidae is a family of echinoderms belonging to the order Holasteroida.

Genera:

- Antrechinus Mooi & David, 1996
- Cystechinus A. Agassiz, 1879
- Pilematechinus A. Agassiz, 1904
- Urechinus A. Agassiz, 1879
