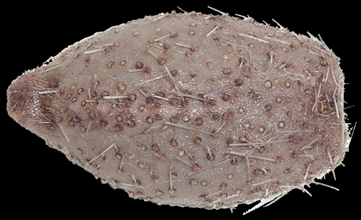
- Pourtalesia wandeli

Scientific classification
- Domain: Eukaryota
- Kingdom: Animalia
- Phylum: Echinodermata
- Class: Echinoidea
- Subclass: Euechinoidea
- Infraclass: Irregularia
- Superorder: Atelostomata
- Order: Holasteroida; Durham & Melville, 1957

= Holasteroida =

Holasteroida Temporal range: Early Cretaceous–recent

Order of sea urchins

Holasteroida is an order of irregular sea urchins.

== Characteristics ==
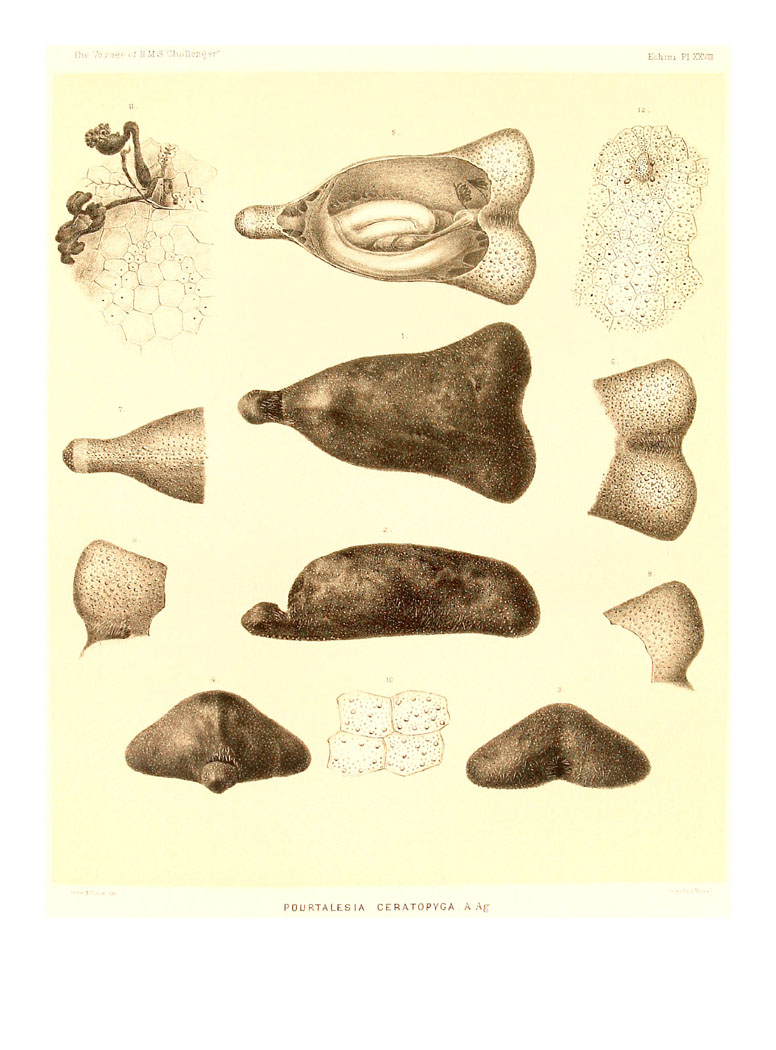
Ceratophysa ceratopyga by A. Agassiz (1881)

These irregular sea urchins are characterized by a particularly marked bilateral symmetry, including for the apical system, which is highly elongated. In some contemporary abyssal groups such as Pourtalesiidae, some species are even bottle-shaped. The mouth (peristome) does not contain an Aristotle's lantern. The anus (periproct) has migrated towards the periphery of the test. The plastron is never amphisternous.

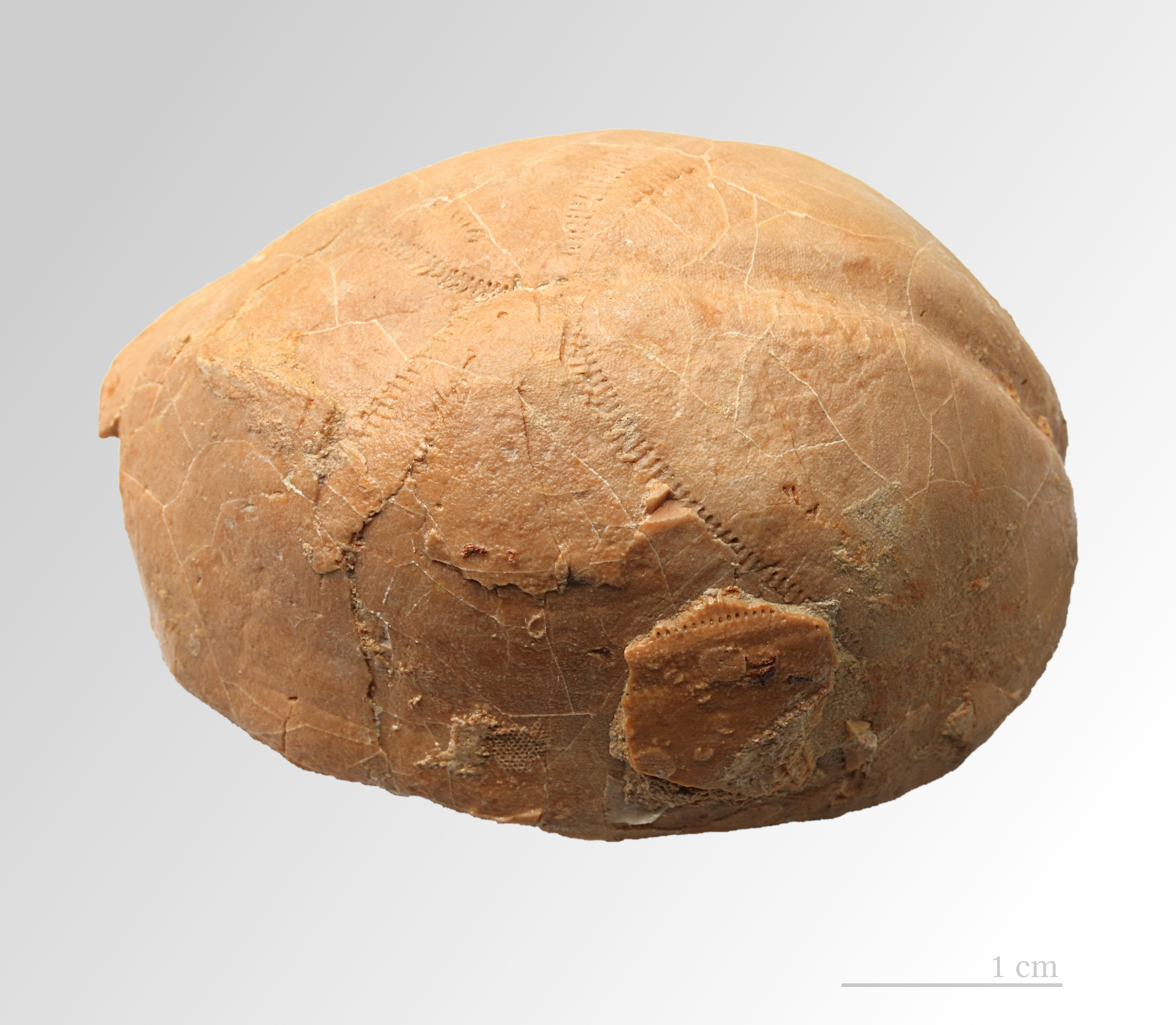
Fossile of Hemipneustes pyrenaicus (Hemipneustidae, Maastrichtian)

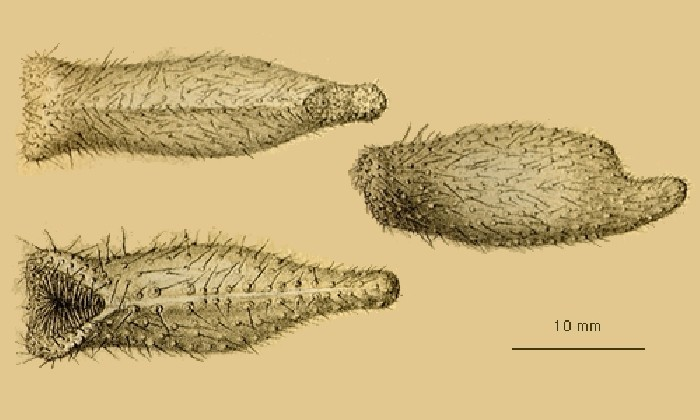
Echinosigra amphora (Pourtalesiidae)

This order seems to have appeared at the lower Cretaceous.

== List of families ==
According to World Register of Marine Species :

- † Family Disasteridae Gras, 1848
  - genus † Disaster L. Agassiz, 1835
- Family Hemipneustidae (Lambert, 1917) †
  - genus Hemipneustes L. Agassiz, 1835 †
  - genus Medjesia Jeffery, 1997 †
  - genus Opisopneustes Gauthier, 1889 †
  - genus Plesiohemipneustes Smith & Wright, 2003 †
  - genus Toxopatagus Pomel, 1883 †
- Suborder Meridosternata (Lovén, 1883)
  - Infraorder Cardiasterina †
    - Family Cardiasteridae Lambert, 1917 †
    - Family Stegasteridae Lambert, 1917f †
  - Family Echinocorythidae Wright, 1857 †
  - Family Holasteridae Pictet, 1857 †
    - Genus Salvaster Saucède, Dudicourt & Courville, 2012 †
  - Infraorder Urechinina
    - Family Calymnidae Mortensen, 1907
    - Family Carnarechinidae Mironov, 1993
    - Family Corystusidae Foster & Philip, 1978
    - Family Plexechinidae Mooi & David, 1996
    - Family Pourtalesiidae A. Agassiz, 1881
    - Family Urechinidae Duncan, 1889
- Family Pseudholasteridae (Smith & Jeffery, 2000) †
  - genus Eoholaster Solovjev, 1989 †
  - genus Giraliaster Foster & Philip, 1978 †
  - genus Pseudholaster Pomel, 1883 †
  - genus Taphraster Pomel, 1883 †
- Family Stenonasteridae (Lambert, 1922) †
  - genus Stenonaster Lambert, 1922 †
