= Carinacea =

Carinacea Temporal range: Late Triassic – Recent
- Paracentrotus lividus

Scientific classification
- Kingdom: Animalia
- Phylum: Echinodermata
- Class: Echinoidea
- Subclass: Euechinoidea
- Infraclass: Carinacea; Kroh & Smith, 2010

Superorders
- Calycina; Echinacea

Group of sea urchins

The infraclassis Carinacea includes most living species of regular sea urchin, and fossil forms going back as far as the Triassic.

== Taxonomy ==
List of orders according to World Register of Marine Species:

- Superorder Calycina
  - Order Phymosomatoida†
- Superorder Echinacea
  - Order Arbacioida (Gregory, 1900)
  - Order Camarodonta (Jackson, 1912)
  - Order Salenioida
  - Order Stomopneustoida (Kroh & Smith, 2010)
  - Family Glyphopneustidae Smith & Wright, 1993†
- Family Hemicidaridae Wright, 1857†
- Family Orthopsidae Duncan, 1889†
- Family Pseudodiadematidae Pomel, 1883†
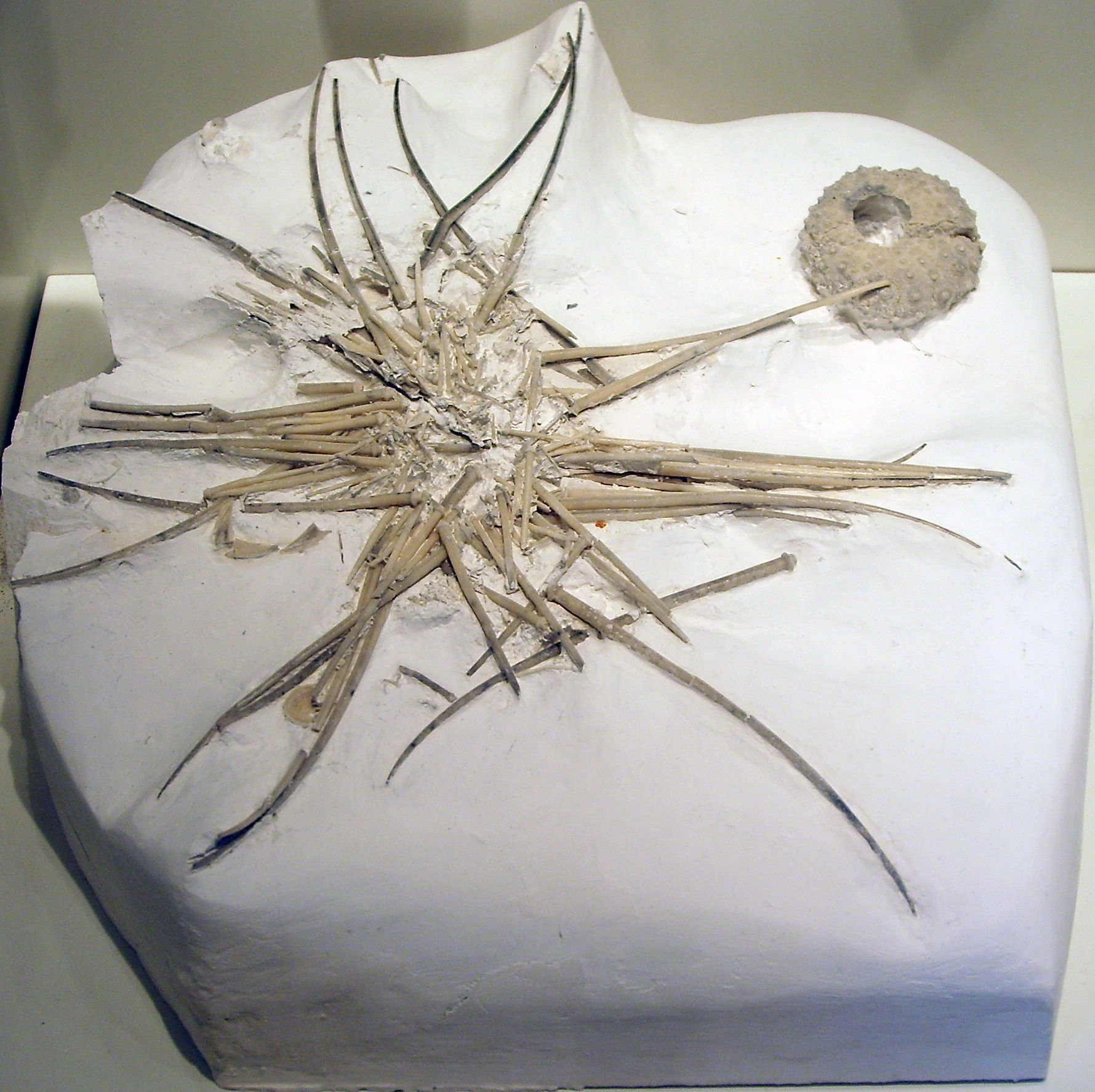
Phymosoma granulosum (Phymosomatoida)

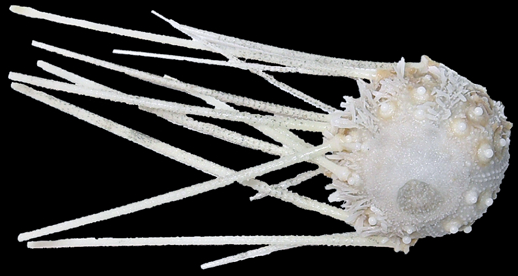
Salenocidaris hastigera (Salenioida)

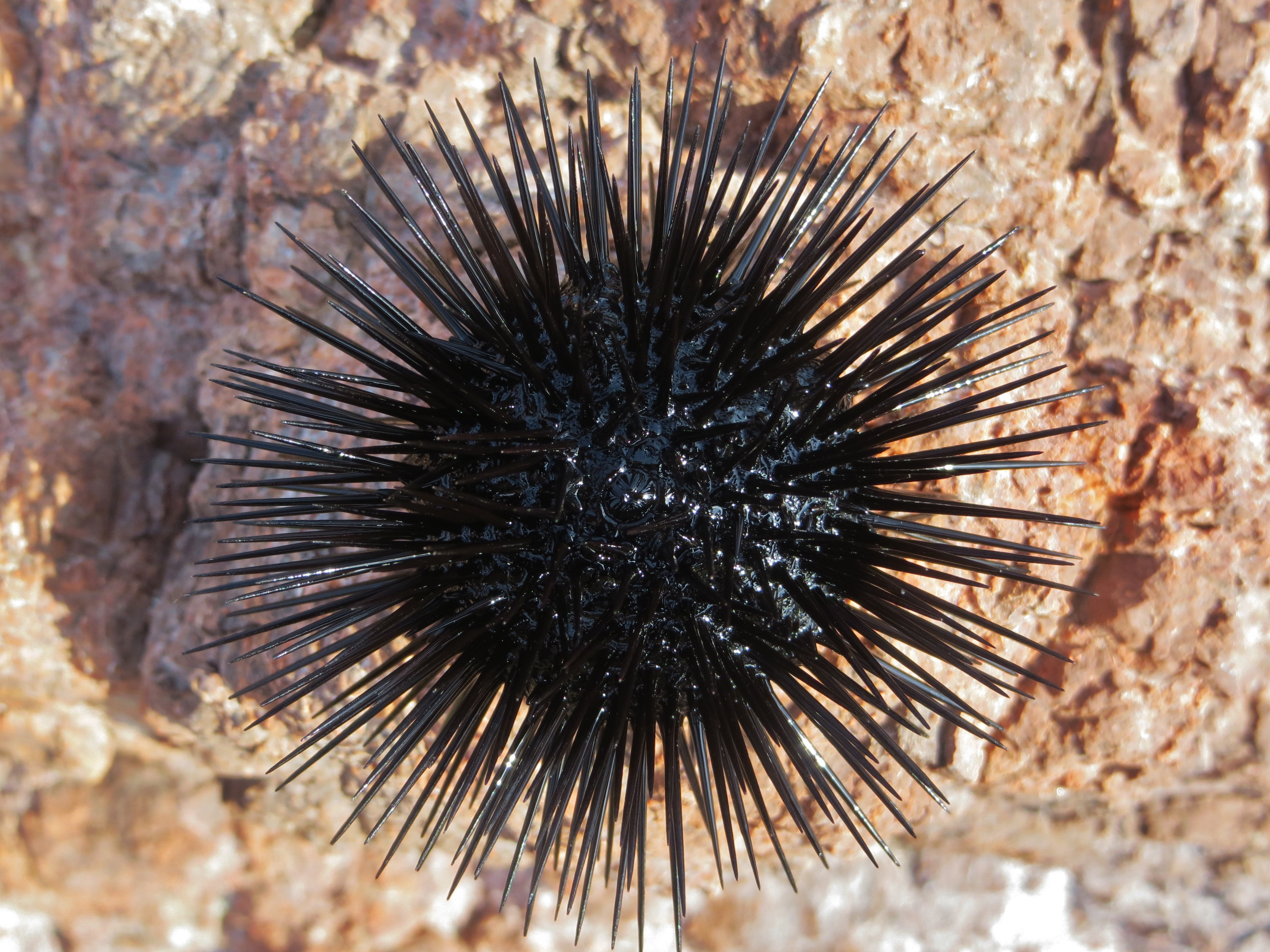
Arbacia lixula (Arbacioida)

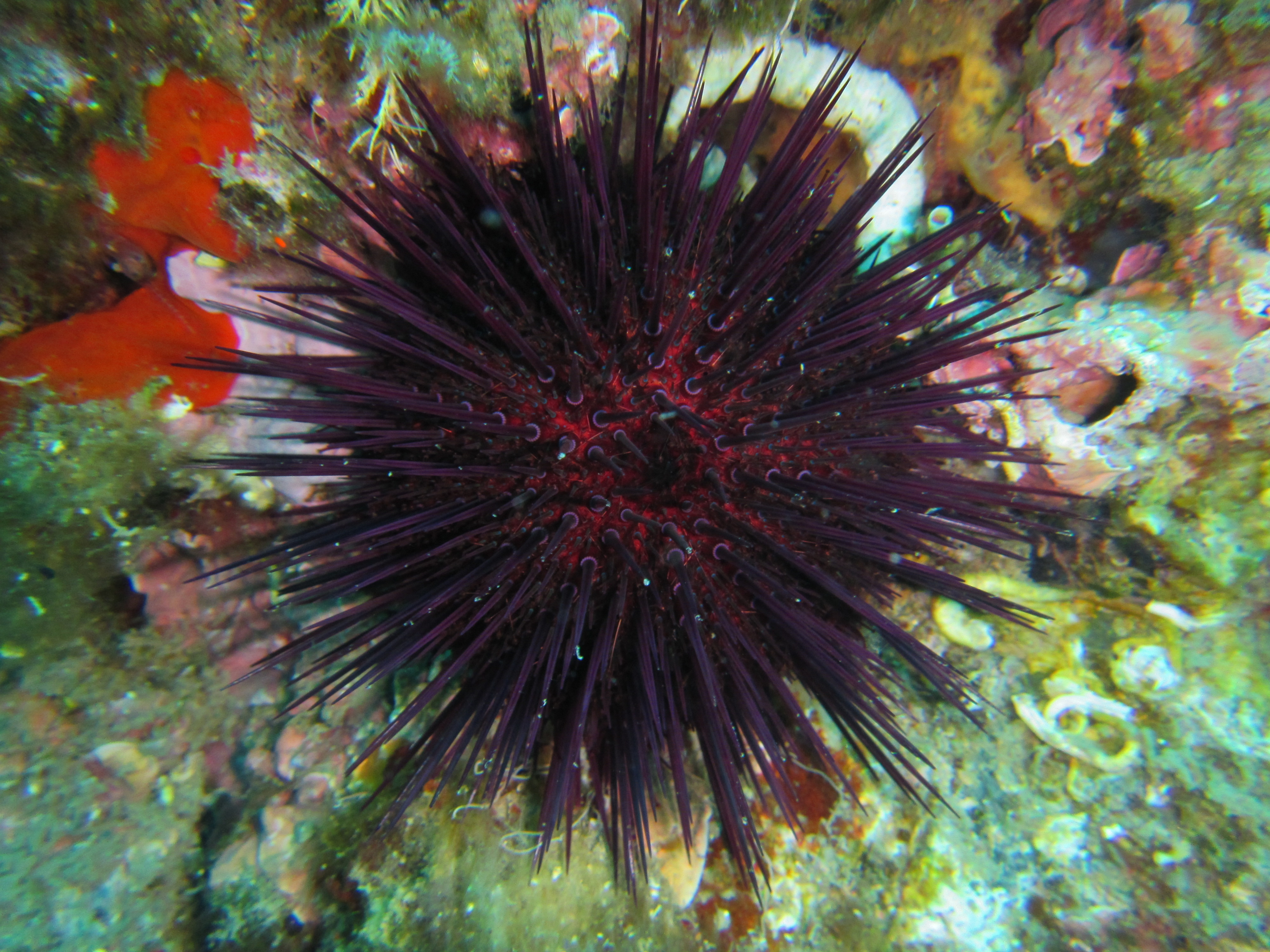
Paracentrotus lividus (Camarodonta)

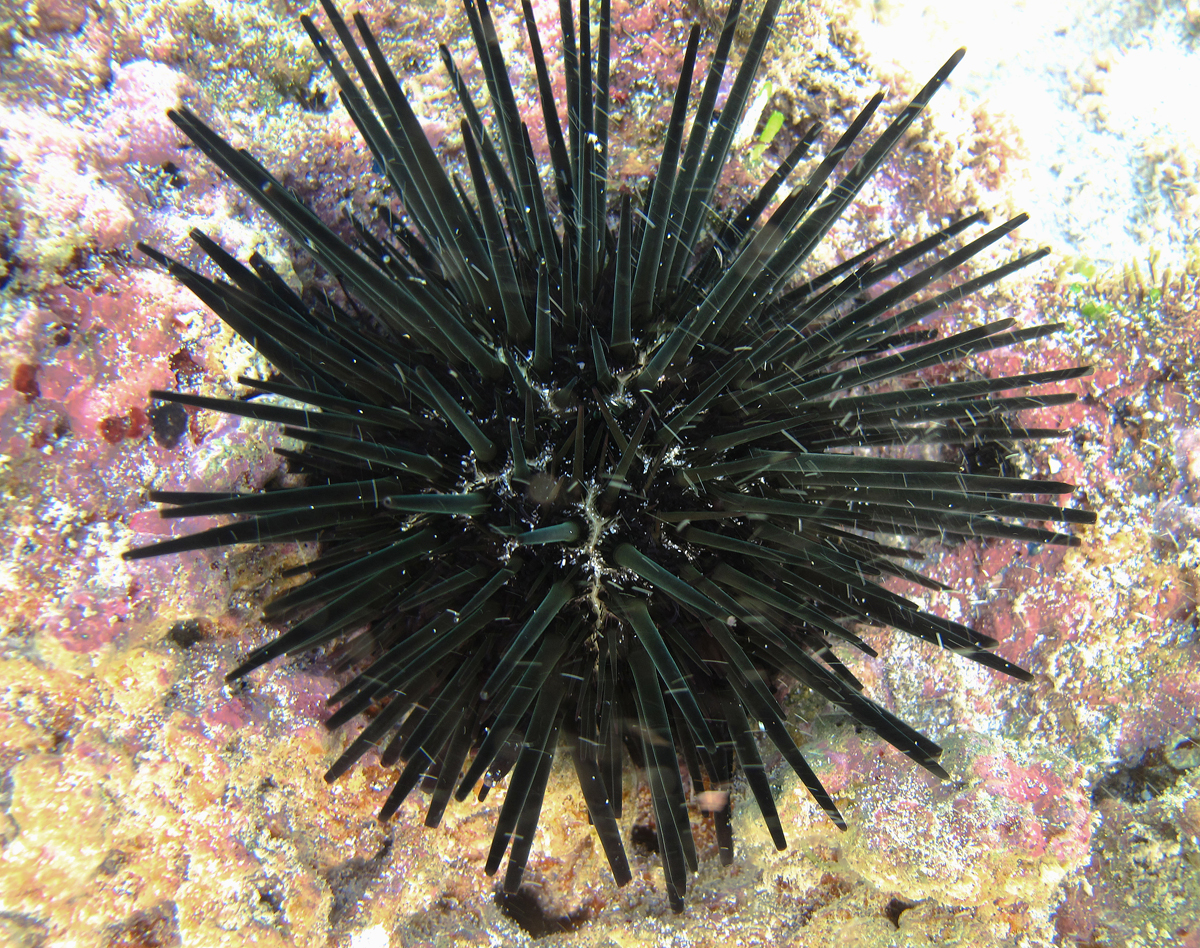
Stomopneustes variolaris (Stomopneustoida)

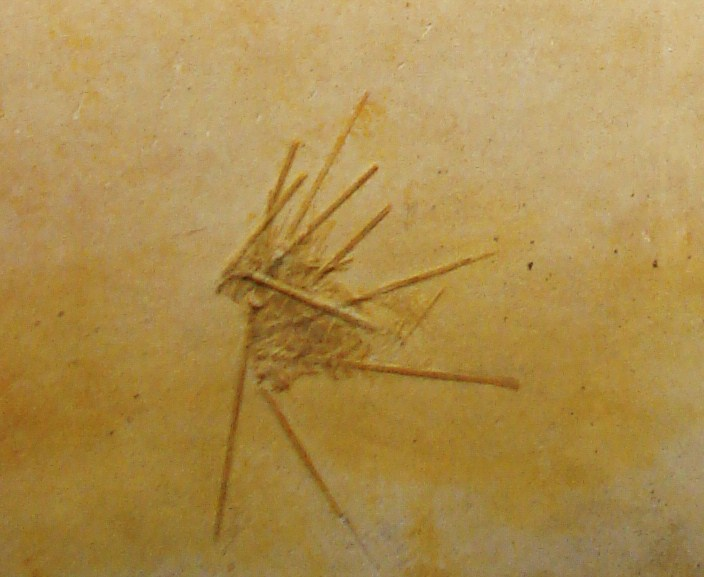
Hemicidaris intermedia (Hemicidaridae)

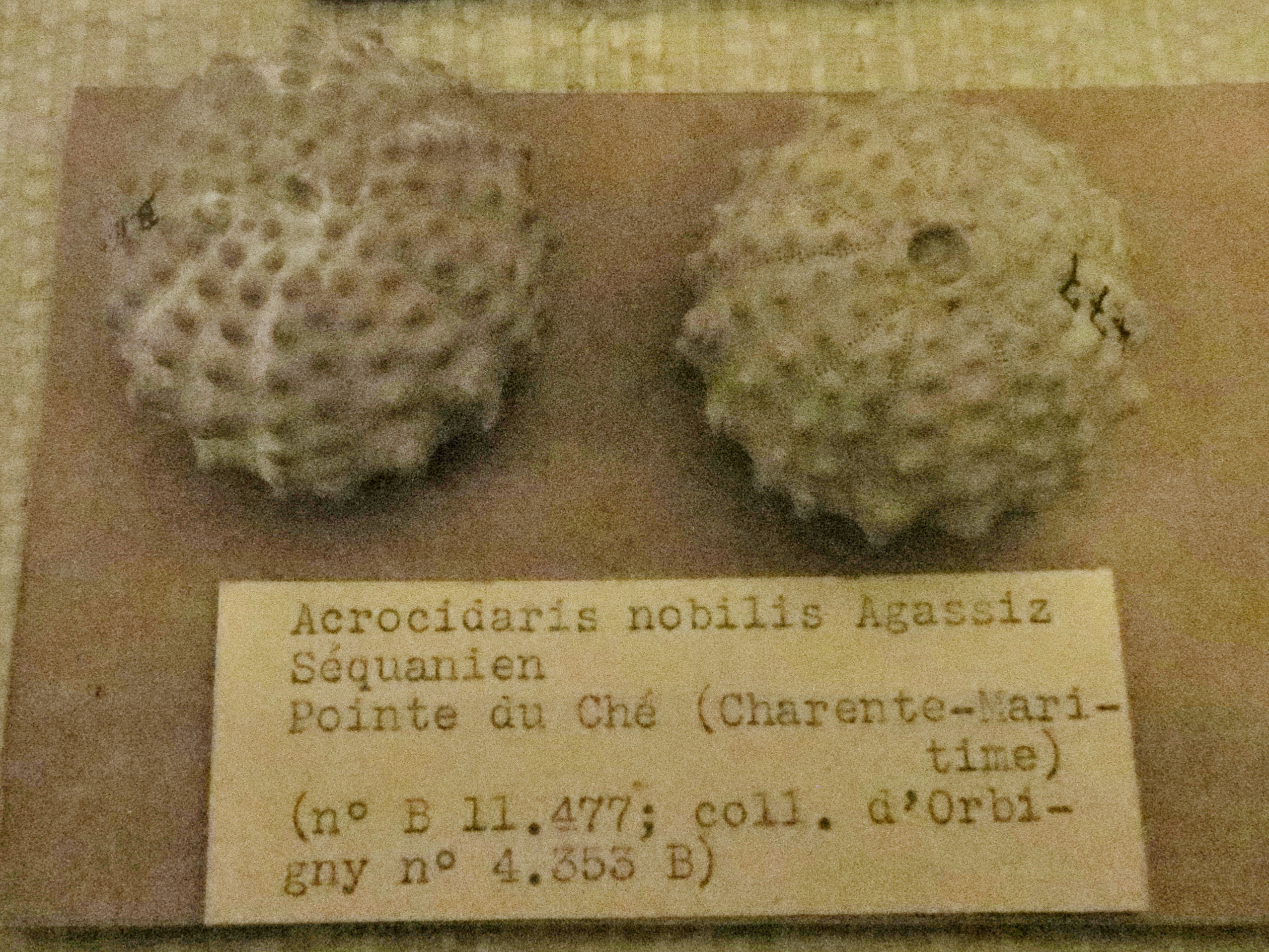
Acrocidaris nobilis (Pseudodiadematidae)

== Bibliography ==
- Andreas Kroh et Andrew B. Smith, « The phylogeny and classification of post-Palaeozoic echinoids », Journal of Systematic Palaeontology, vol. 8, no 2, 2010, p. 147-212
