= Euechinoidea =

Euechinoidea Temporal range: Late Triassic – Recent
- Paracentrotus lividus

Scientific classification
- Kingdom: Animalia
- Phylum: Echinodermata
- Class: Echinoidea
- Subclass: Euechinoidea; Bronn, 1860

Superorders
- Diadematacea; Echinacea; Gnathostomata; Atelostomata

Subclass of sea urchins

The subclass Euechinoidea includes almost all living species of sea urchin, with fossil forms going back as far as the Triassic.

== Taxonomy ==
List of orders according to World Register of Marine Species:

- Infraclass Acroechinoidea
  - Order Aspidodiadematoida
  - Order Diadematoida
  - Order Micropygoida
  - Order Pedinoida
- Infraclass Carinacea
  - Superorder Calycina
    - Order Phymosomatoida†
  - Superorder Echinacea
    - Order Arbacioida
    - Order Camarodonta
    - Order Salenioida
    - Order Stomopneustoida
- Order Echinothurioida
- Infraclass Irregularia
  - Superorder Atelostomata
    - Order Holasteroida
    - Order Spatangoida
  - Order Echinoneoida
  - Order Holectypoida†
  - Superorder Neognathostomata
    - Order Cassiduloida
    - Order Clypeasteroida
    - Order Echinolampadoida
    - Order Nucleolitidae†
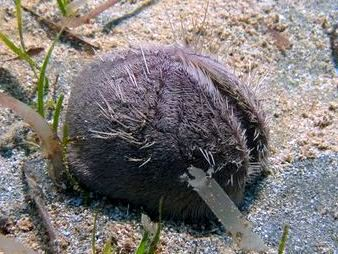
Spatangus purpureus

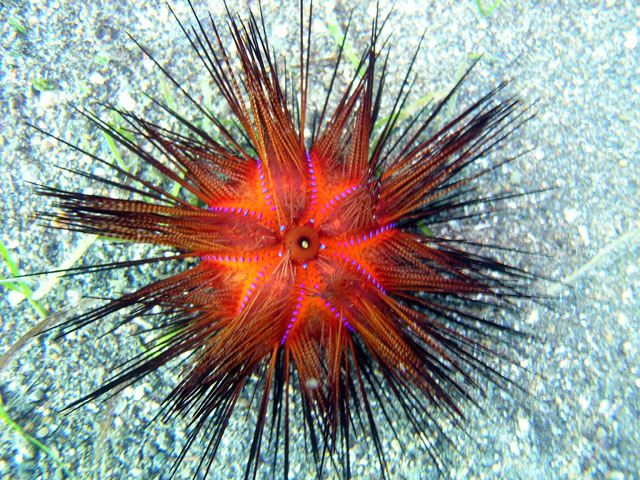
Astropyga radiata

Paracentrotus lividus

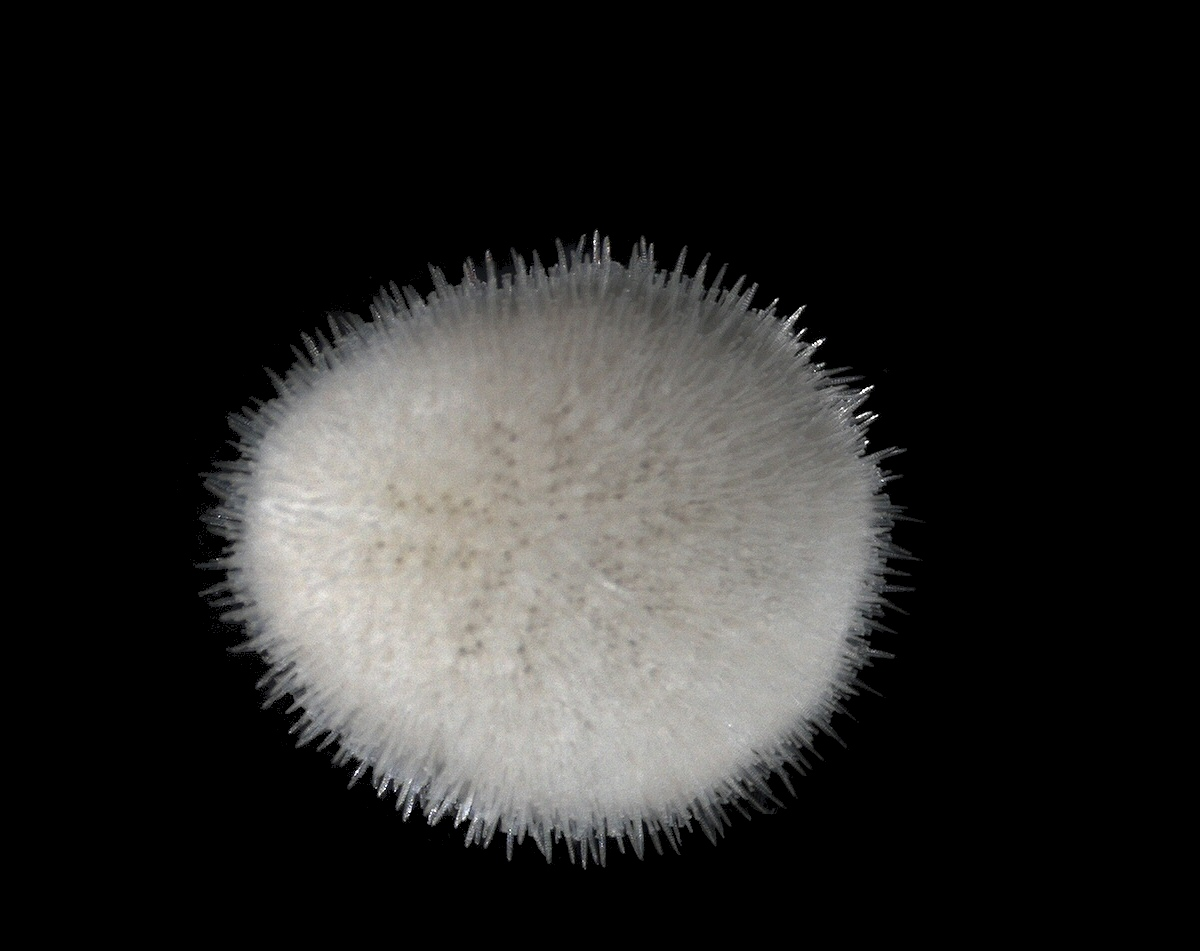
Echinocyamus pusillus

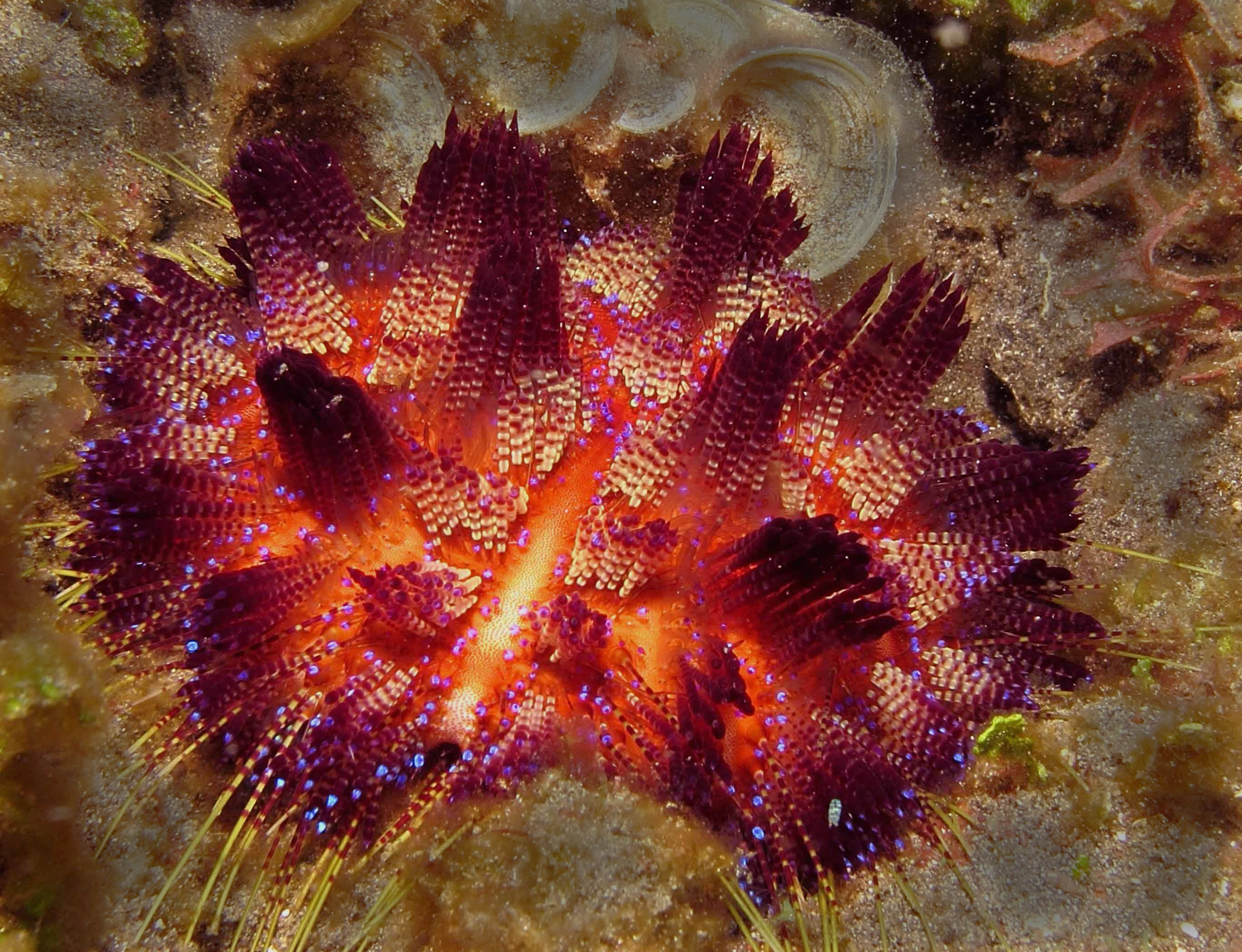
Asthenosoma varium.
