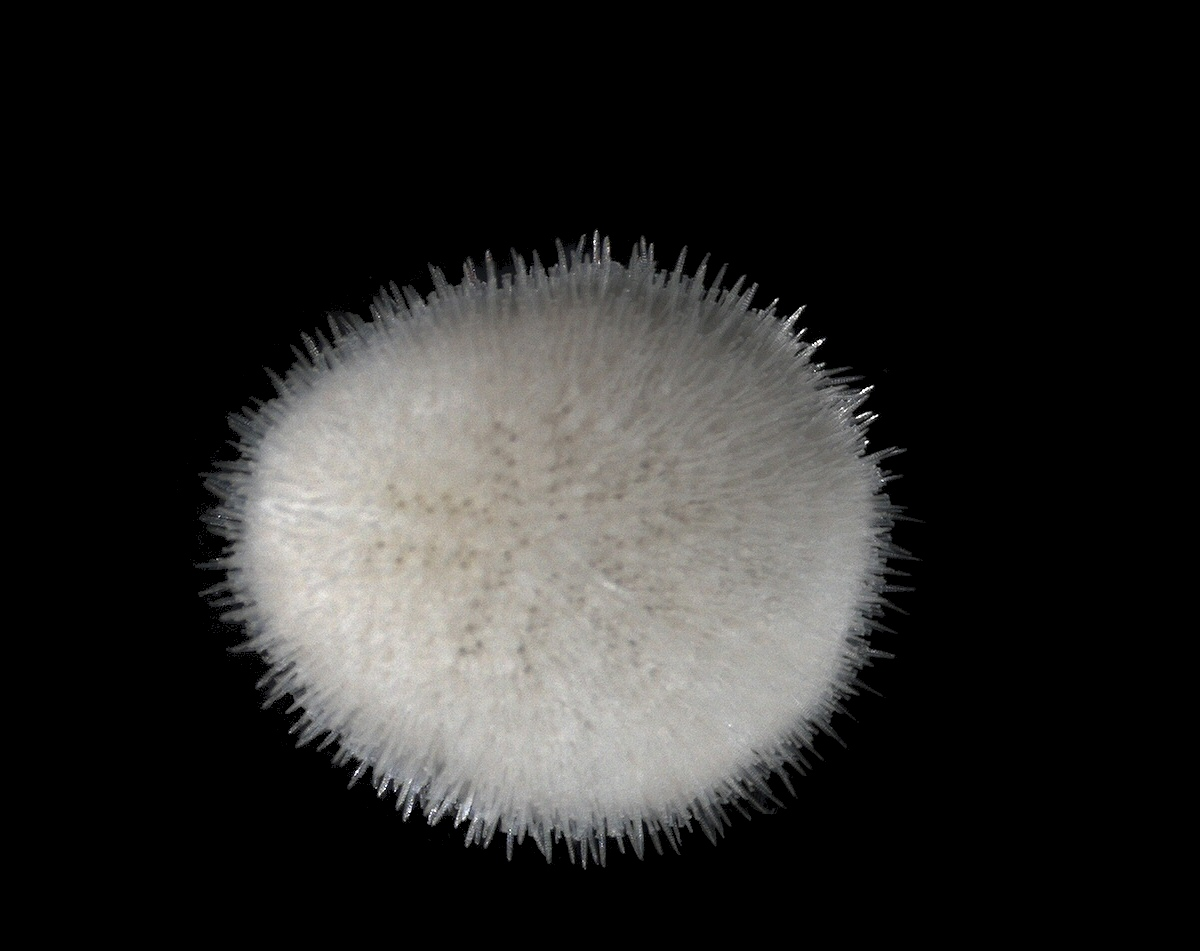
- Echinocyamus pusillus (order Clypeasteroida)

Scientific classification
- Kingdom: Animalia
- Phylum: Echinodermata
- Class: Echinoidea
- Subclass: Euechinoidea
- Superorder: Gnathostomata

Orders
- Clypeasteroida; Holectypoida

= Gnathostomata (echinoderm) =

Gnathostomata Temporal range: Lower Jurassic–recent

Superorder of sea urchins

The Gnathostomata are a superorder of sea urchins, including the familiar sand dollars.

Gnathostomatans are irregular in shape, but unlike other irregular sea urchins, possess a feeding lantern. The mouth is located in the centre of the lower surface, as it is in most other sea urchins, but the anus is found to one side of the upper surface, rather than being central. The members of the group are adapted for burrowing in soft-bottomed marine environments.
