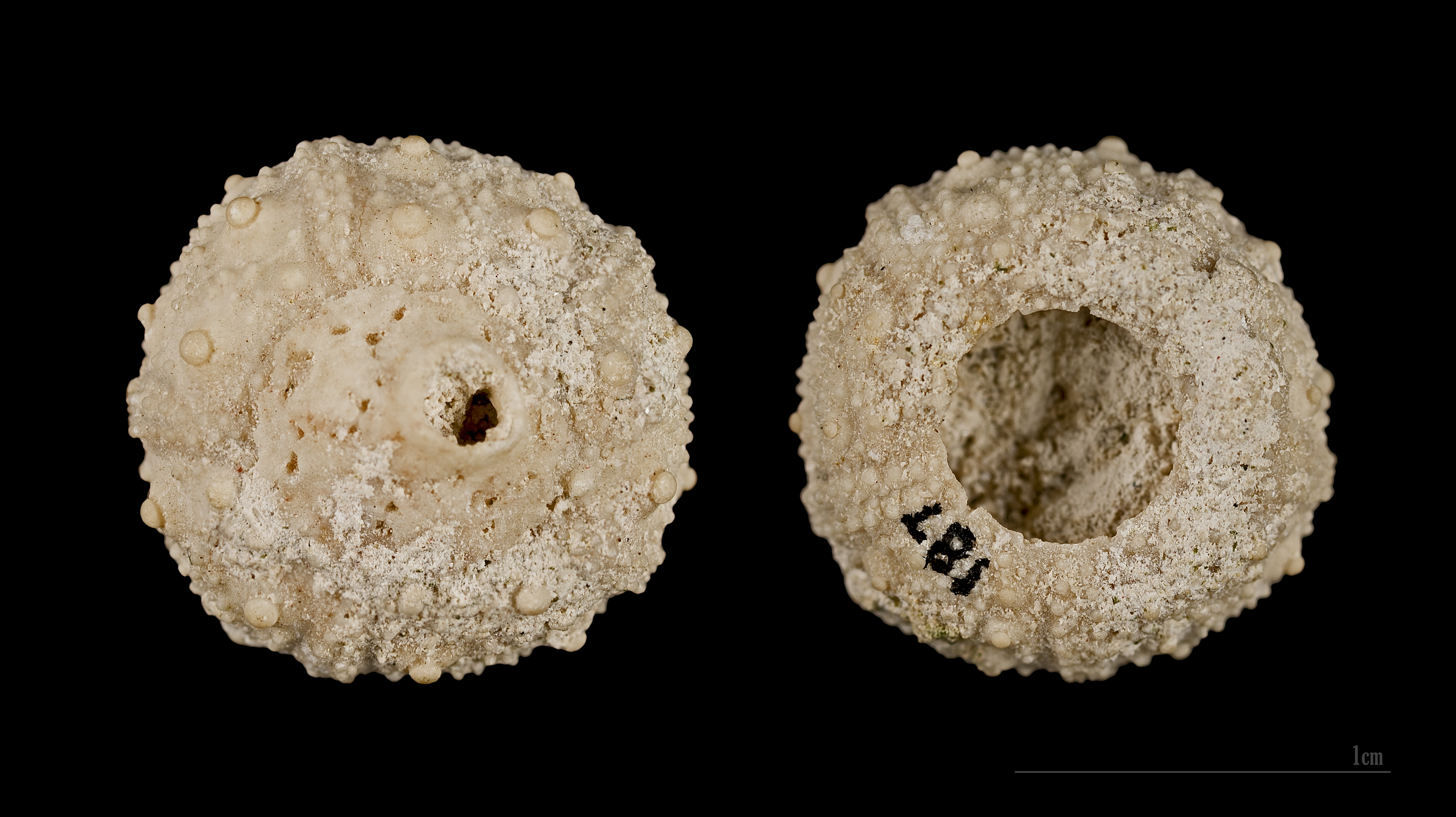
- Salenia petalifera

Scientific classification
- Kingdom: Animalia
- Phylum: Echinodermata
- Class: Echinoidea
- Subclass: Euechinoidea
- Infraclass: Carinacea
- Superorder: Echinacea
- Order: Salenioida; Delage, 1903

= Salenioida =

Salenioida Temporal range: Middle Jurassic–recent

Order of sea urchins

The Salenioida are an order of sea urchins.

== Description and characteristics ==
They are distinguished from other sea urchins by the presence of a large plate on the upper surface, with the anus to one side. They have very large tubercles between the ambulacral plates, and much smaller ones on the ambulacral plates themselves.

== Taxonomy ==
According to World Register of Marine Species :

- family Saleniidae L. Agassiz, 1838
- family Acrosaleniidae Gregory, 1900†
- family Goniophoridae Smith & Wright, 1990†
- family Hyposaleniidae Mortensen, 1934†
- family Pseudosaleniidae Vadet, 1999b†
