= Emiratia =

Emiratia Temporal range: Cenomanian

Scientific classification
- Kingdom: Animalia
- Phylum: Echinodermata
- Class: Echinoidea
- Order: †Phymosomatoida
- Family: †Emiratiidae
- Genus: †Emiratia; Ali, 1990
- Species: †E. raskhaimahensis

Binomial name
- †Emiratia raskhaimahensis Ali, 1990

Extinct genus of sea urchins

Emiratia is a genus of extinct sea urchin known from the Cenomanian Maudad formation of the United Arab Emirates. It is known from only one species, Emiratia raskhaimahensis, and is placed in the family Emiratiidae. It was named by Ali, 1990.
