= Mortonia =

Mortonia may refer to:

- Mortonia (echinoderm), a genus of sand dollars in the family Fibulariidae
- Mortonia (plant), a genus of plants in the family Celastraceae
