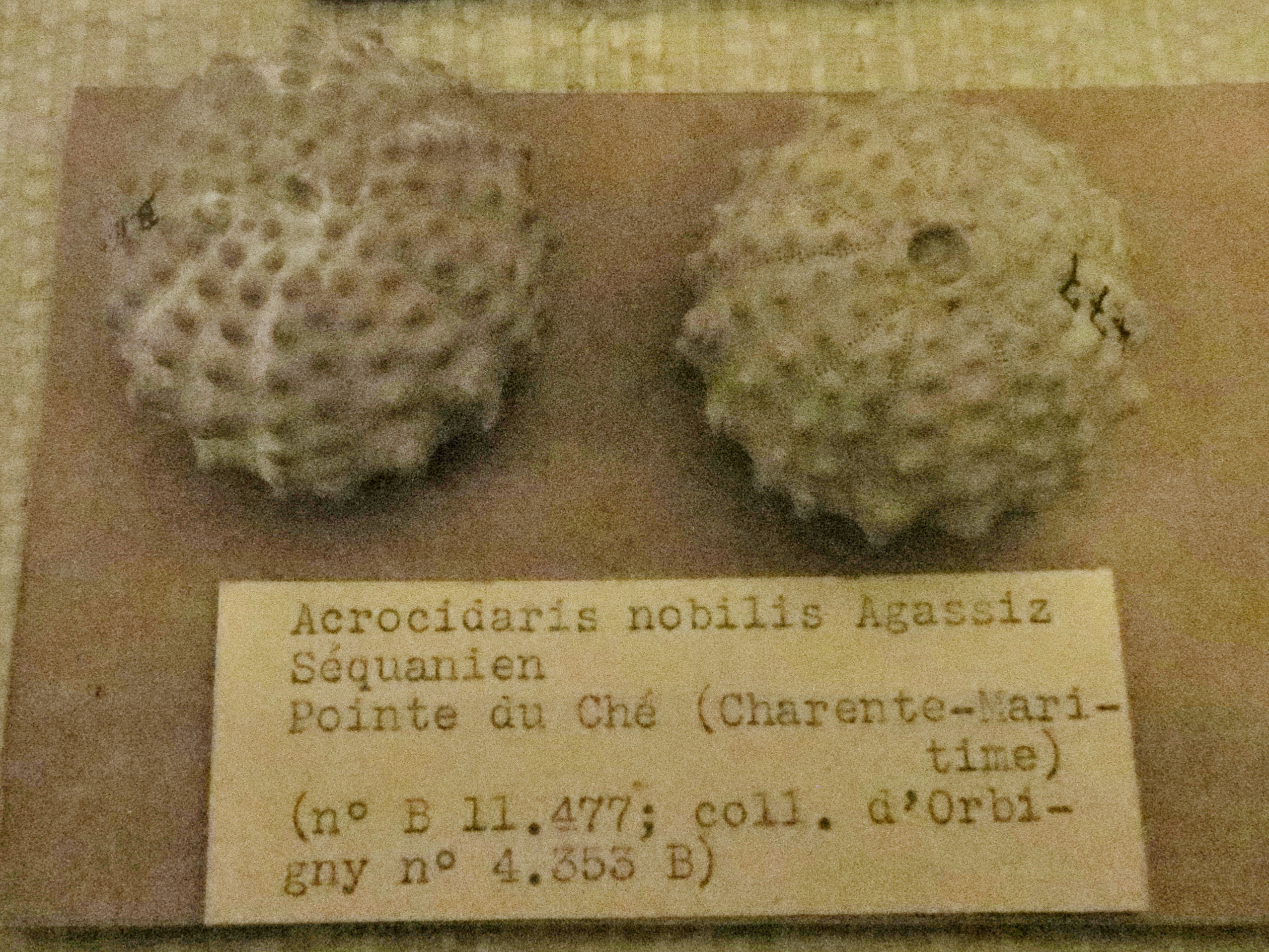
- Acrocidaris nobilis

Scientific classification
- Kingdom: Animalia
- Phylum: Echinodermata
- Class: Echinoidea
- Order: †Hemicidaroida
- Family: †Pseudodiadematidae; Pomel, 1883

= Pseudodiadematidae =

Extinct family of sea urchins

Pseudodiadematidae are members of the phylum Echinodermata. Their fossil remains date to the Cretaceous period (144 - 66.4 MYA). Its child geniuses are Pseudodiadema, Acrocidaris, Acrotiaris and Aplodiadema. The distribution of fossils in the Cretaceous are in Algeria, Brazil, Egypt, France, Hungary, Jordan, Madagascar, Morocco, Nigeria, Peru, Portugal, Saudi Arabia, Spain, Switzerland, the United Arab Emirates, the United Kingdom, United States (Texas), and Yemen. In the Jurassic to Cretaceous it is found in China. In the Jurassic found in Ethiopia, France, Germany, India, Luxembourg, Morocco, Poland, Portugal, Saudi Arabia, Somalia, Switzerland, and the United Kingdom.

The full fossil reference needs translation into English.
