= Echinocyamus =

Scientific classification
- Kingdom: Animalia
- Phylum: Echinodermata
- Class: Echinoidea
- Order: Clypeasteroida
- Family: Fibulariidae
- Genus: Echinocyamus van Phelsum, 1774

Genus of sand dollars

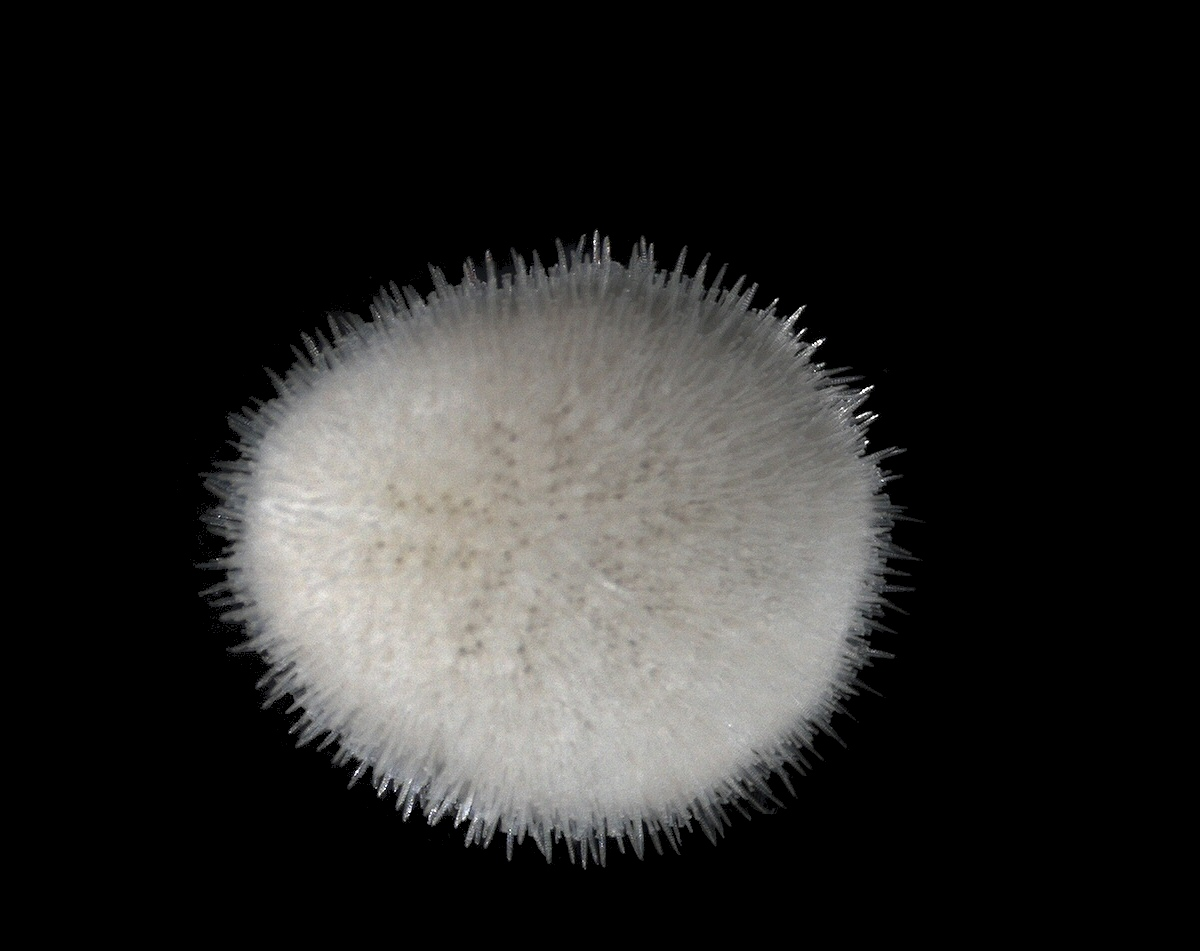
Pea Urchin from the Belgian coastal waters

Echinocyamus is a genus of echinoderms belonging to the family Fibulariidae.

The genus has almost cosmopolitan distribution.

Species:

- Echinocyamus apicatus Mortensen, 1948
- Echinocyamus avilensis Lambert, 1931
- Echinocyamus basseae Lambert, 1936
- Echinocyamus bernaniensis Srivastava, 1978
- Echinocyamus bisexus Kier, 1968
- Echinocyamus bisperforatus Leske, 1778
- Echinocyamus caribbeanensis Kier, 1966
- Echinocyamus chipolanus Cooke, 1942
- Echinocyamus convergens Mortensen, 1948
- Echinocyamus crispus Mazzetti, 1893
- Echinocyamus cyphostomus Lambert, 1936
- Echinocyamus elegans Mazzetti, 1893
- Echinocyamus grandiporus Mortensen, 1907
- Echinocyamus grandis H.L.Clark, 1925
- Echinocyamus gurnahensis Roman & Strougo, 1994
- Echinocyamus hungaricus Szörényi, 1952
- Echinocyamus huxleyanus Meyer, 1886
- Echinocyamus incertus H.L.Clark, 1914
- Echinocyamus insularis Mironov & Sagaidachny, 1984
- Echinocyamus intermedius Hawkins, 1922
- Echinocyamus jacqueli Lambert, 1936
- Echinocyamus jaisalmerensis Srivastava & Mathur, 1996
- Echinocyamus jeanneti Lambert, 1932
- Echinocyamus kamrupensis Das Gupta, 1929
- Echinocyamus lipparinii Airaghi, 1939
- Echinocyamus macneili Cooke, 1959
- Echinocyamus macrostomus Mortensen, 1907
- Echinocyamus maropiensis Lambert, 1936
- Echinocyamus megapetalus H.L.Clark, 1914
- Echinocyamus meridionalis Clark & Twitchell, 1915
- Echinocyamus nummulicus
- Echinocyamus nummuliticus Duncan & Sladen
- Echinocyamus pannonicus Szörényi, 1952
- Echinocyamus parviporus Kier, 1964
- Echinocyamus parvus Emmonds, 1858
- Echinocyamus petalus Kier, 1964
- Echinocyamus planissimus H.L.Clark, 1938
- Echinocyamus planus Lambert, 1933
- Echinocyamus platytatus H.L.Clark, 1914
- Echinocyamus prostratus Nisiyama, 1968
- Echinocyamus provectus de Meijere, 1903
- Echinocyamus pusillus (O.F.Müller, 1776)
- Echinocyamus raoi Srivastava, 1978
- Echinocyamus rostratus Lambert, 1929
- Echinocyamus scaber de Meijere, 1903
- Echinocyamus schoelleri Castex, 1947
- Echinocyamus sollers Koehler, 1922
- Echinocyamus subpiriformis Cottreau, 1933
- Echinocyamus texanus (Clark & Twitchell, 1915)
- Echinocyamus truncatus L.Agassiz, 1841
- Echinocyamus vaughani (Clark & Twitchell, 1915)
- Echinocyamus wilsoni Kier, 1997
- Echinocyamus woodi Currie, 1930
