= Emiratiidae =

Scientific classification
- Kingdom: Animalia
- Phylum: Echinodermata
- Class: Echinoidea
- Order: †Phymosomatoida
- Family: †Emiratiidae; Ali, 1990

Extinct family of sea urchins

Emiratiidae is an extinct family of sea urchins in the order Phymosomatoida.

Emiratiidae includes the following genera:

- †Allomma Pomel, 1883
- †Colpotiara Pomel, 1883
- †Emiratia Ali, 1990
- †Loriolia Neumayr, 1881
