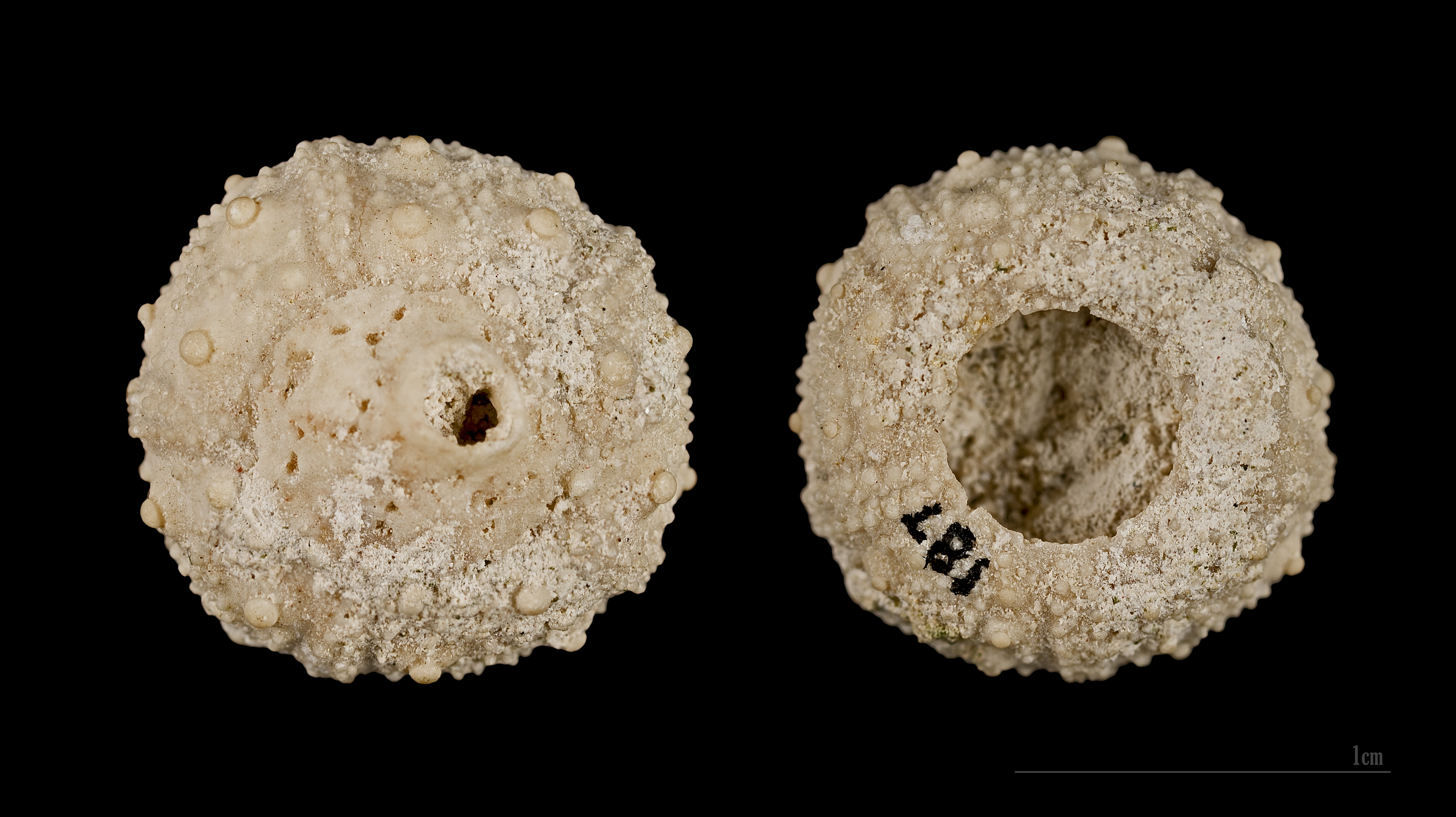
- Salenia petalifera

Scientific classification
- Kingdom: Animalia
- Phylum: Echinodermata
- Class: Echinoidea
- Order: Salenioida
- Family: Saleniidae; L. Agassiz, 1838

= Saleniidae =

Family of sea urchins

Saleniidae is a family of echinoderms belonging to the order Salenioida. It was first identified by Louis Agassiz in 1838.

It can be distinguished from other families of the order Salenioida by its primary tubercles, which are imperforate and typically crenulated.

== Genera ==
Genera:

- Acanthosalenia Nicolleau, Martinez & Vadet, 2014
- Bathysalenia Pomel, 1883
- Holosalenia Smith & Wright, 1990
- Leptosalenia Smith & Wright, 1990
- Novasalenia Zitt & Geys, 2003
- Platysalenia Smith & Wright, 1990
- Pleurosalenia Pomel, 1883
- Salenia Gray, 1835
- Salenidia Pomel, 1883
- Salenocidaris A. Agassiz, 1869
- Trisalenia Lambert, 1895
- Valsalenia Mortensen, 1934
