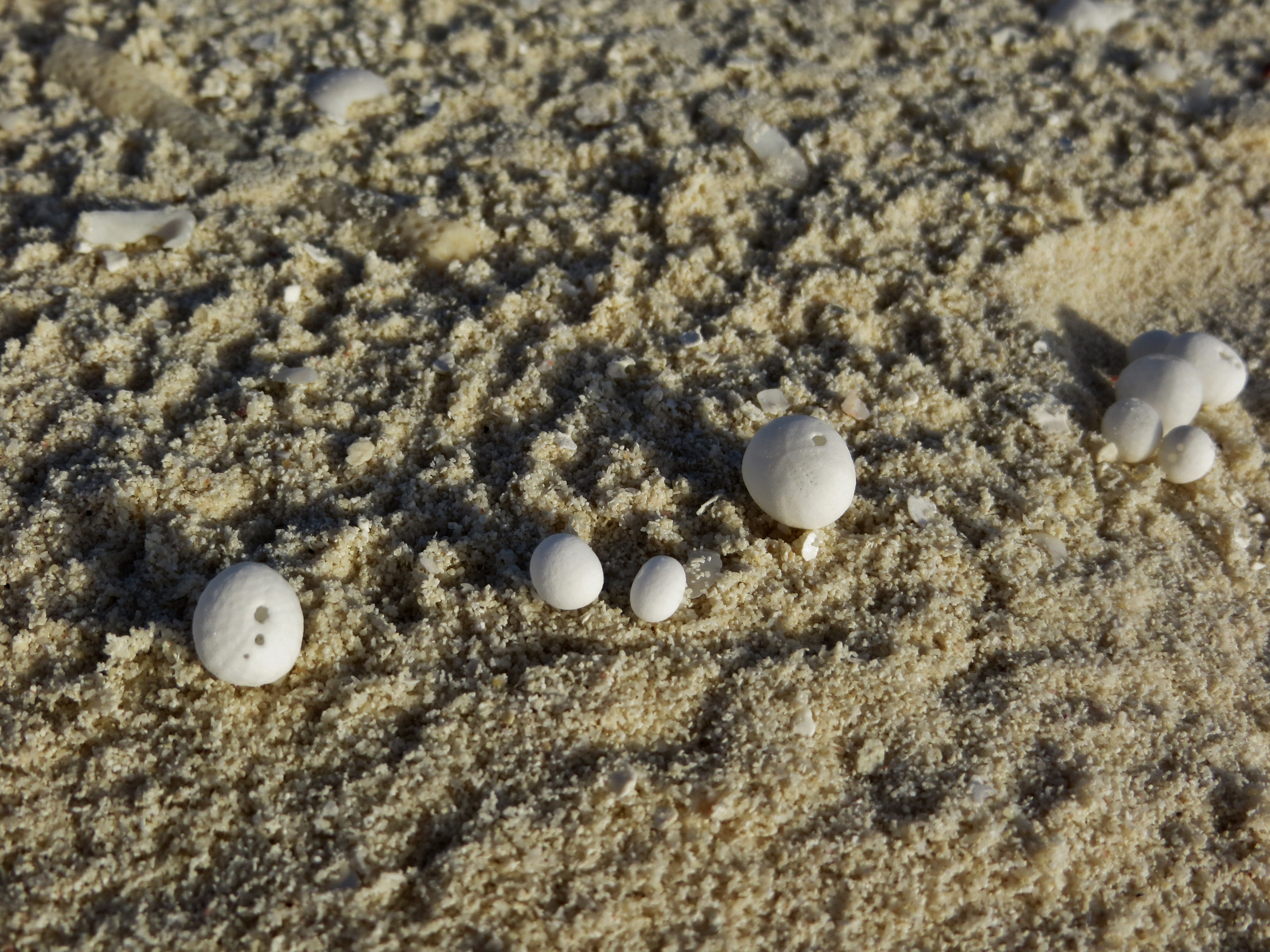
- Fibularia sp. from Landaa Giraavaru

Scientific classification
- Kingdom: Animalia
- Phylum: Echinodermata
- Class: Echinoidea
- Order: Clypeasteroida
- Family: Fibulariidae
- Genus: Fibularia; Lamarck, 1816

= Fibularia =

Genus of sand dollars

Fibularia is a genus of echinoderms belonging to the family Fibulariidae. The genus has almost a cosmopolitan distribution.

== Species ==
There are six recognized species:

- Fibularia coffea Tanaka, Wakabayashi & Fujita, 2019
- Fibularia cribellum de Meijere, 1903
- Fibularia japonica Shigei, 1982
- Fibularia nutriens H.L. Clark, 1909
- Fibularia ovulum Lamarck, 1816
- Fibularia plateia H.L. Clark, 1928

Subgenus Fibularia (Fibulariella) Mortensen, 1948 has been raised to genus rank as Fibulariella Mortensen, 1948.
