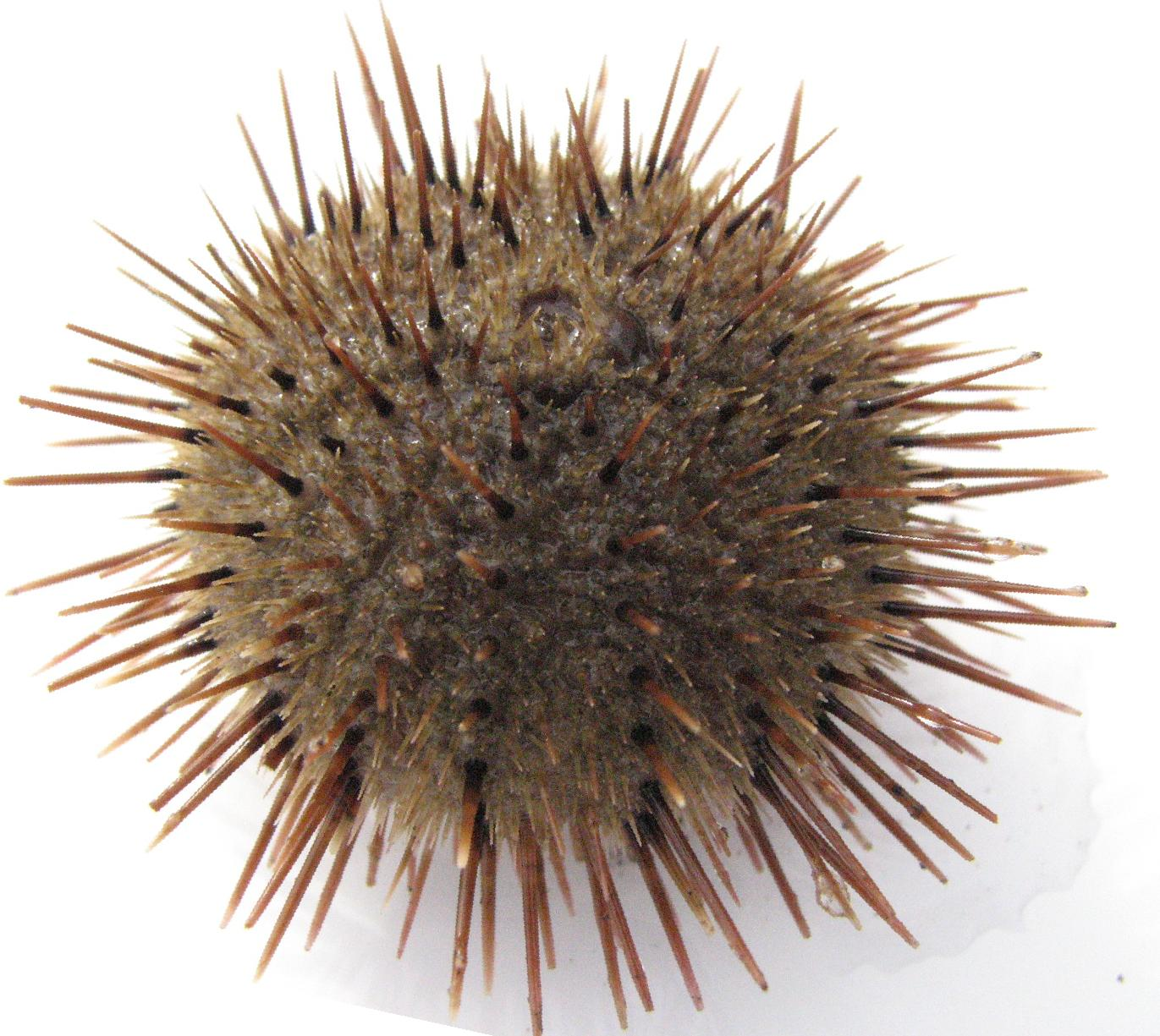
- Glyptocidaris crenularis

Scientific classification
- Kingdom: Animalia
- Phylum: Echinodermata
- Class: Echinoidea
- Order: Stomopneustoida
- Family: Glyptocidaridae; Jensen, 1982

= Glyptocidaridae =

Family of sea urchins

Glyptocidaridae is a family of echinoderms belonging to the order Stomopneustoida.

Genera:

- Glyptocidaris Agassiz, 1864
