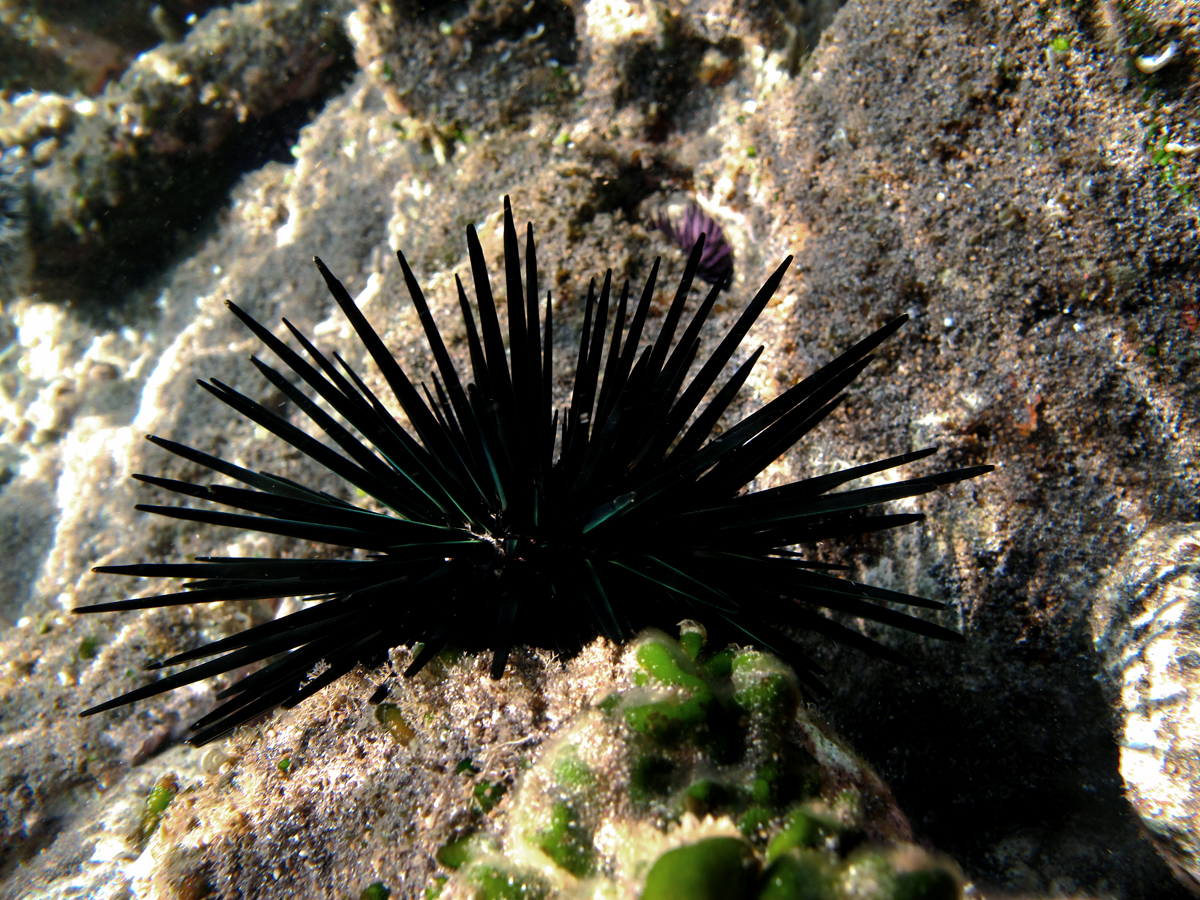
- Stomopneustes variolaris

Scientific classification
- Kingdom: Animalia
- Phylum: Echinodermata
- Class: Echinoidea
- Order: Stomopneustoida
- Family: Stomopneustidae; Mortensen, 1903

= Stomopneustidae =

Family of sea urchins

Stomopneustidae is a family of echinoderms belonging to the order Stomopneustoida.

Genera:

- Parastomechinus Philip, 1963
- Phymechinus Desor, 1856
- Phymotaxis Lambert & Thiéry, 1914
- Promechinus Vadet, Nicolleau & Reboul, 2010
- Stomopneustes L. Agassiz, 1841
- Triadechinus H.L. Clark, 1927
