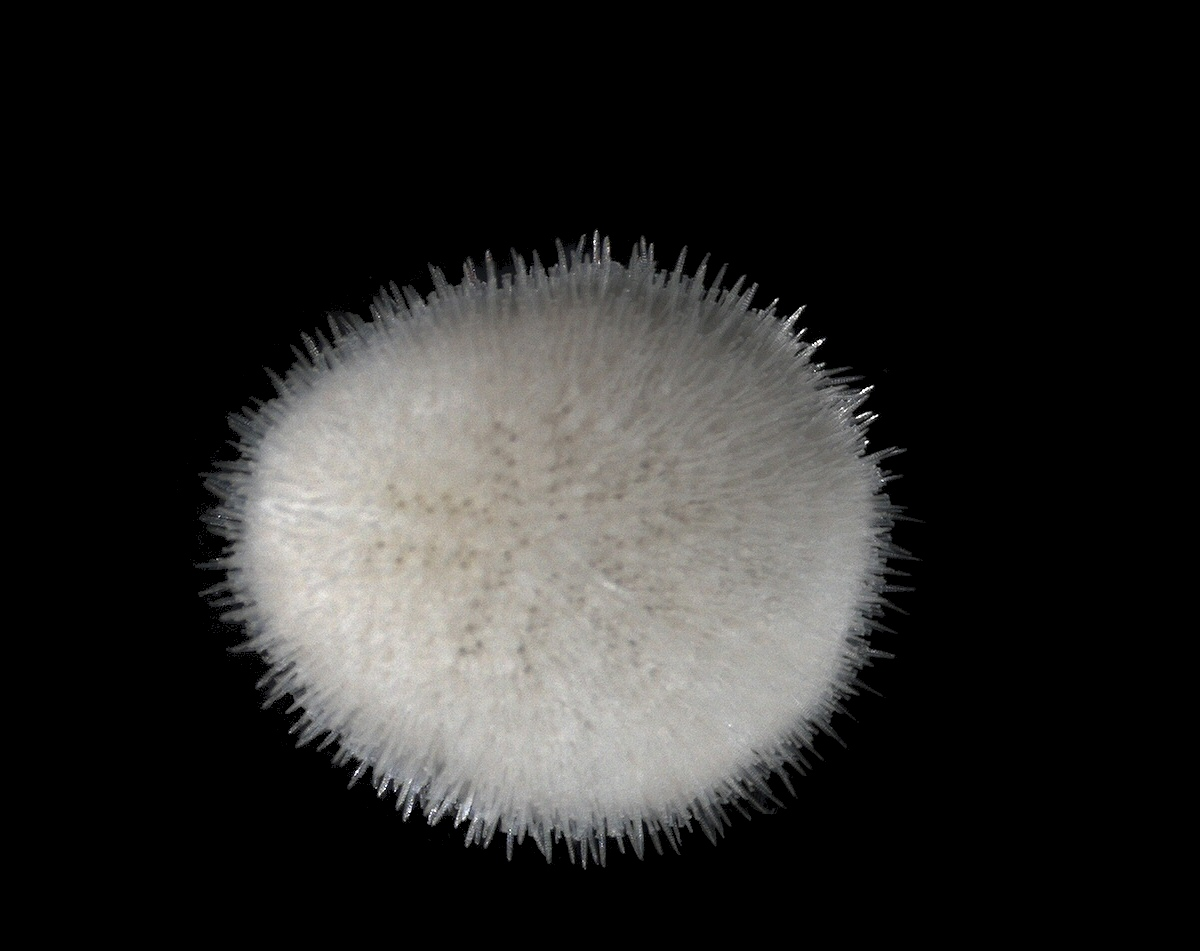
- Aboral view of live E. pusillus

Scientific classification
- Kingdom: Animalia
- Phylum: Echinodermata
- Class: Echinoidea
- Order: Clypeasteroida
- Family: Fibulariidae
- Genus: Echinocyamus
- Species: E. pusillus

Binomial name
- Echinocyamus pusillus (O.F. Müller, 1776)

Synonyms
- Clypeaster pulvinulus (Pennant, 1812); Echinocyamus angulosus Lütken, 1856; Echinocyamus minimus Girard, 1850; Echinocyamus minutus (Gmelin, 1791); Echinocyamus parthenopaeus Costa, 1868; Echinocyamus speciosus Costa, 1868; Echinocyamus tarentinus (Lamarck, 1816); Echinus minutus Gmelin, 1791; Echinus pulvinulus Pennant, 1812; Echinus pusillus (O.F. Müller, 1776); Fibularia equina Aradas, 1850; Fibularia pusilla (O.F. Müller, 1776); Fibularia tarentina Lamarck, 1816; Spatagus pusillus O.F. Müller, 1776

= Echinocyamus pusillus =

Species of sea urchin

Echinocyamus pusillus, commonly known as the pea urchin or green urchin, is a species of sand dollar, a sea urchin in the family Fibulariidae, native to the northeastern Atlantic Ocean and the Mediterranean Sea. It buries itself in gravel or coarse sand at depths down to about 1,250 m (4,000 ft).

== Description ==
Echinocyamus pusillus is a small sea urchin with a flattened, oval body up to 15 mm (0.6 in) long. The anterior end is slightly pointed. The aboral (upper) surface is convex while the oral (lower) surface is flat. The ambulacral plates widen and form a petal-like pattern on the aboral surface, and it is through each of these areas that six to nine pairs of tube feet protrude. The whole test is clad in short dense spines, giving the living animal a furry appearance; spines of two types are present, relatively long, sharply-pointed ones and shorter ones with serrated tips. The mouth is in the centre of the oral surface and the anus is also on the oral surface but further back. The colour of this sea urchin is greenish or yellowish-grey, and it turns bright green if it gets injured.

== Distribution and habitat ==
Echinocyamus pusillus has a wide distribution in the northeastern Atlantic Ocean. Its range extends southwards from Iceland, Norway and Denmark to the Azores, Cape Bojador in Western Sahara, and the Mediterranean Sea. It is common in the North Sea and round the coasts of Britain. It occurs at depths from the lower subtidal down to about 1,250 m (4,000 ft). Gravel and coarse sand provide suitable habitat in which it can bury itself.

== Ecology ==
The spines are covered with fine, hair-like cilia, and are used to burrow or creep through the sediment while the animal searches for its food. It feeds on detritus, Foraminifera, diatoms and other edible particles, moving these with its tube feet to its mouth, where they are crushed by its jaws, and the organic matter is separated from the sediment. It is often found in association with such sea urchins as Spatangus purpureus and Psammechinus miliaris, the starfish Asterias rubens and the brittle star Ophiura albida.
