= Phymosomatoida =

Phymosomatoida Temporal range: Lower Jurassic–Quaternary

Scientific classification
- Kingdom: Animalia
- Phylum: Echinodermata
- Class: Echinoidea
- Subclass: Euechinoidea
- Infraclass: Carinacea
- Superorder: Calycina; Gregory, 1900
- Order: †Phymosomatoida; Mortensen, 1904

Families
- †Diplopodiidae Smith & Wright, 1993; †Emiratiidae Ali, 1990; †Heterodiadematidae Smith & Wright, 1993; †Phymosomatidae Pomel, 1883; †Polydiaematidae Hess, 1972

Order of sea urchins

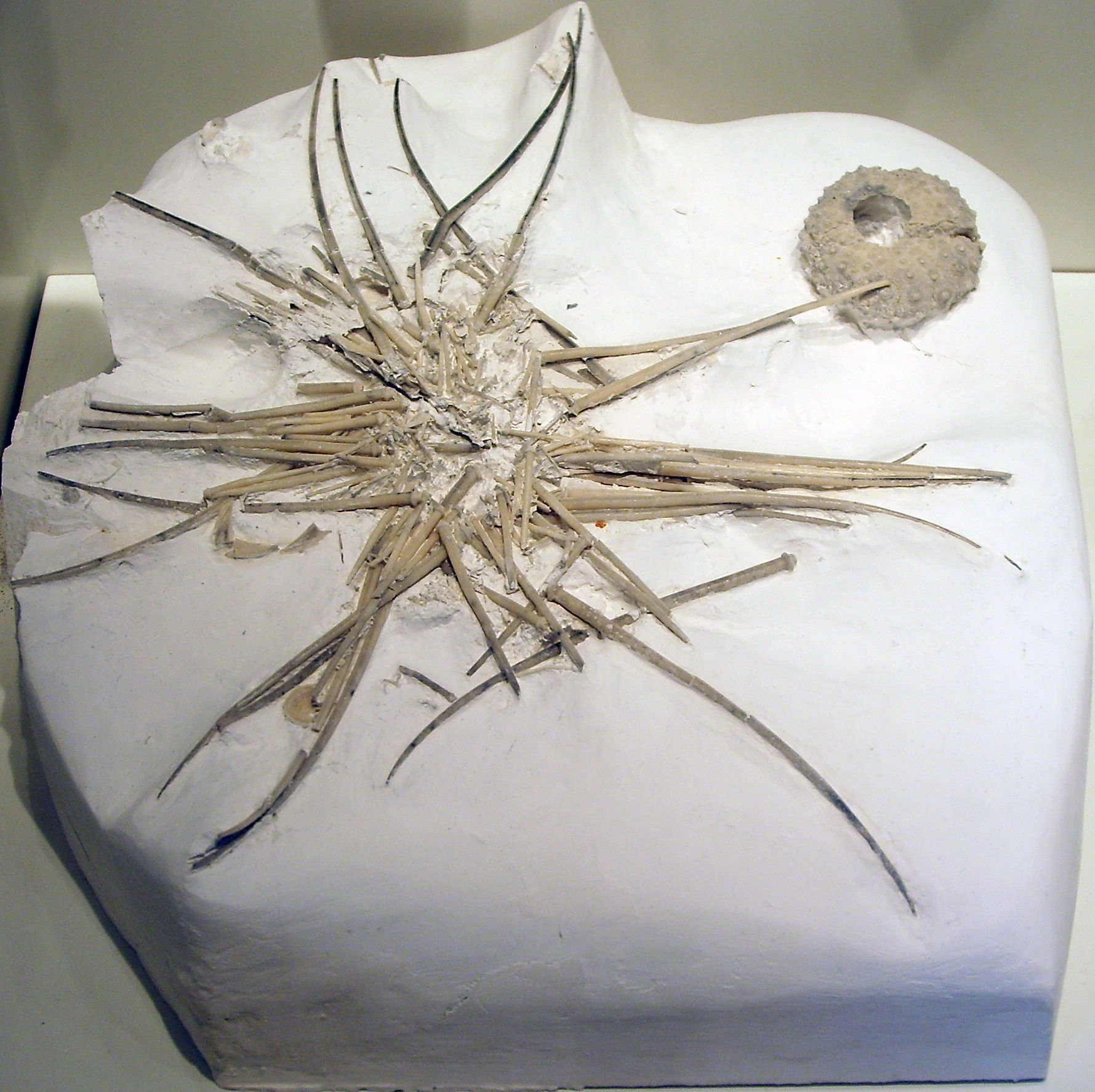
Phymosoma granulosum fossil (Danekræ specimen DK 154)

The Phymosomatoida are an order of sea urchins, found in Europe, North America, North Africa and the Middle East.

They are distinguished from other sea urchins by the presence of large fused plates on top of the feeding lantern. The test is usually sculpted to some degree, but, unlike their close relatives the Temnopleuroida, the tubercles are never perforated. The opening in the test through which the anus passes, known as the periproct, is unusually large in sea urchins from this group. The apical disc, around the mouth, is only loosely attached to the rest of the test and is often missing in fossil species, giving the false impression that they also have a large oral opening.
