= Holectypoida =

Holectypoida Temporal range: Lower Jurassic–recent

Scientific classification
- Kingdom: Animalia
- Phylum: Echinodermata
- Class: Echinoidea
- Subclass: Euechinoidea
- Infraclass: Irregularia
- Order: Holectypoida; Duncan, 1889

Families
- See text

Order of sea urchins

The Holectypoida are an order of sea urchins related to the sand dollars. The order consists of just two living genera, but was once more diverse.

== Description and characteristics ==
In appearance, the living holectypoids are similar to sand dollars, but with less flattened bodies and an oval outline. They also lack the petal-like patterns found on the bodies of sand dollars.

== Taxonomy ==
According to World Register of Marine Species:

- †Anorthopygidae Wagner & Durham, 1966
- †Coenholectypidae Smith & Wright, 1999
- Discoididae Lambert, 1900
- †Holectypidae Lambert, 1900
