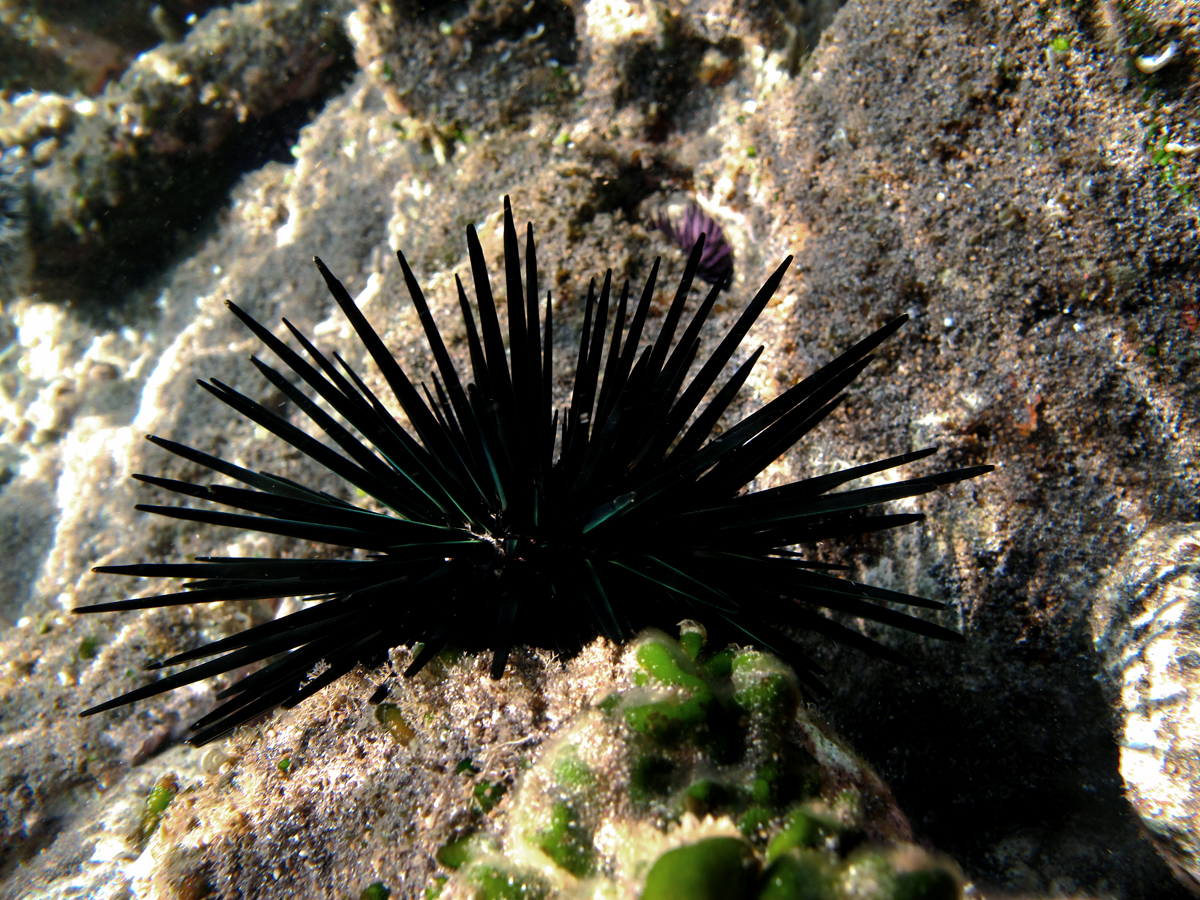
- Stomopneustes variolaris

Scientific classification
- Kingdom: Animalia
- Phylum: Echinodermata
- Class: Echinoidea
- Order: Stomopneustoida
- Family: Stomopneustidae
- Genus: Stomopneustes; L. Agassiz, 1841
- Species: S. variolaris

Binomial name
- Stomopneustes variolaris (Lamarck, 1816)

= Stomopneustes =

Long-spined sea urchin

Species of sea urchin

Stomopneustes variolaris, the black sea urchin or long-spined sea urchin, is a species of sea urchin, the only one in its genus Stomopneustes and only species still alive in its family Stomopneustidae. It is found throughout the tropical Indo-Pacific, with a patchy distribution.

== Description ==
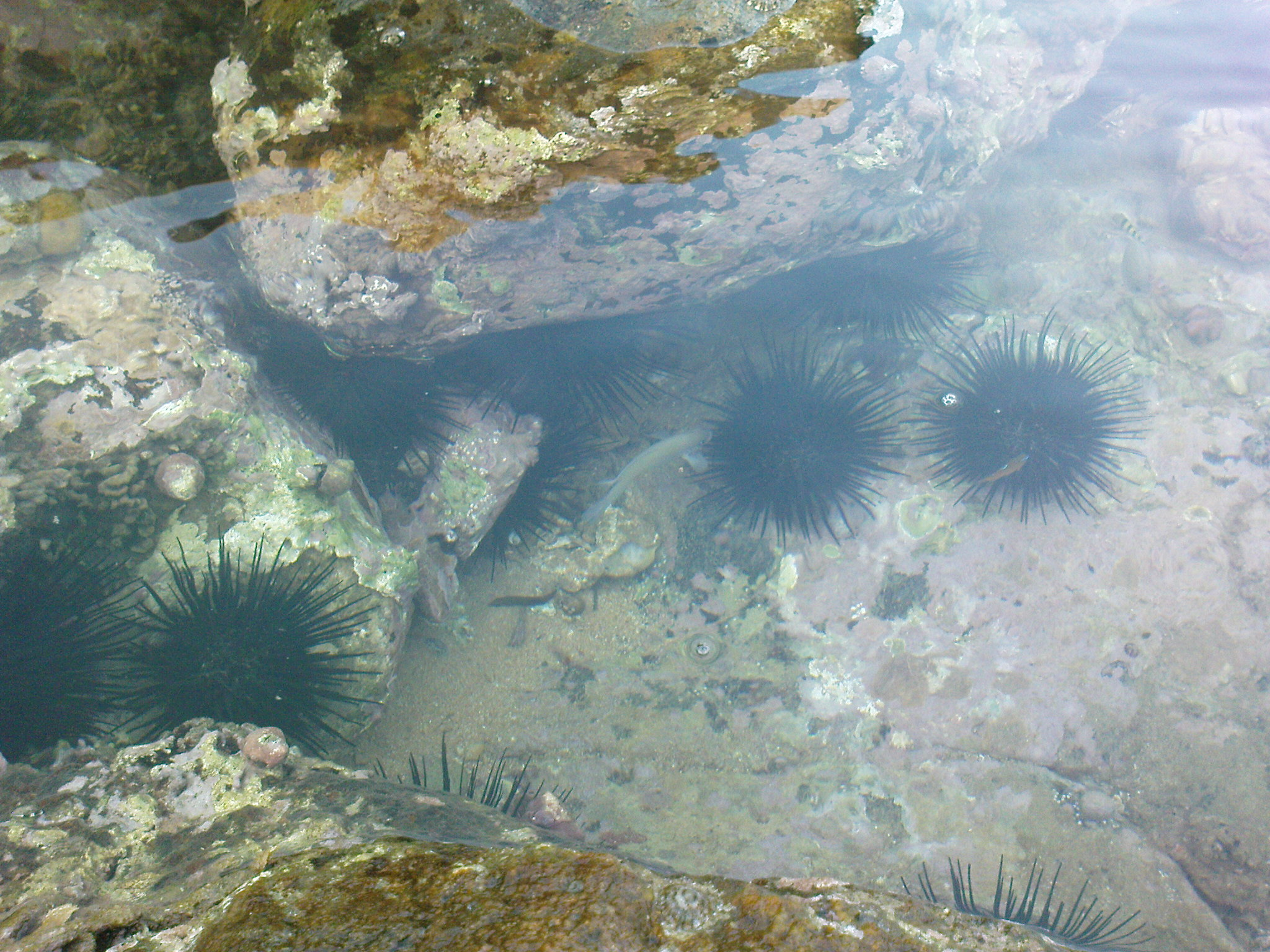
S. variolaris in Sri Lanka.

It is a rather big and strong regular sea urchin. The spines are robust and sharp, black with sometimes a blue-greenish tinge (depending on the light). They can be recognized thanks to the 5 grey sutures on the upper face, exhibiting distinctive zig-zag pattern. The oral face is clearer. The juveniles are clearer too (they can be black but also pale brown), and often show strikingly asymmetrical spines, due to their habit to use them for digging hiding holes in soft rocks.

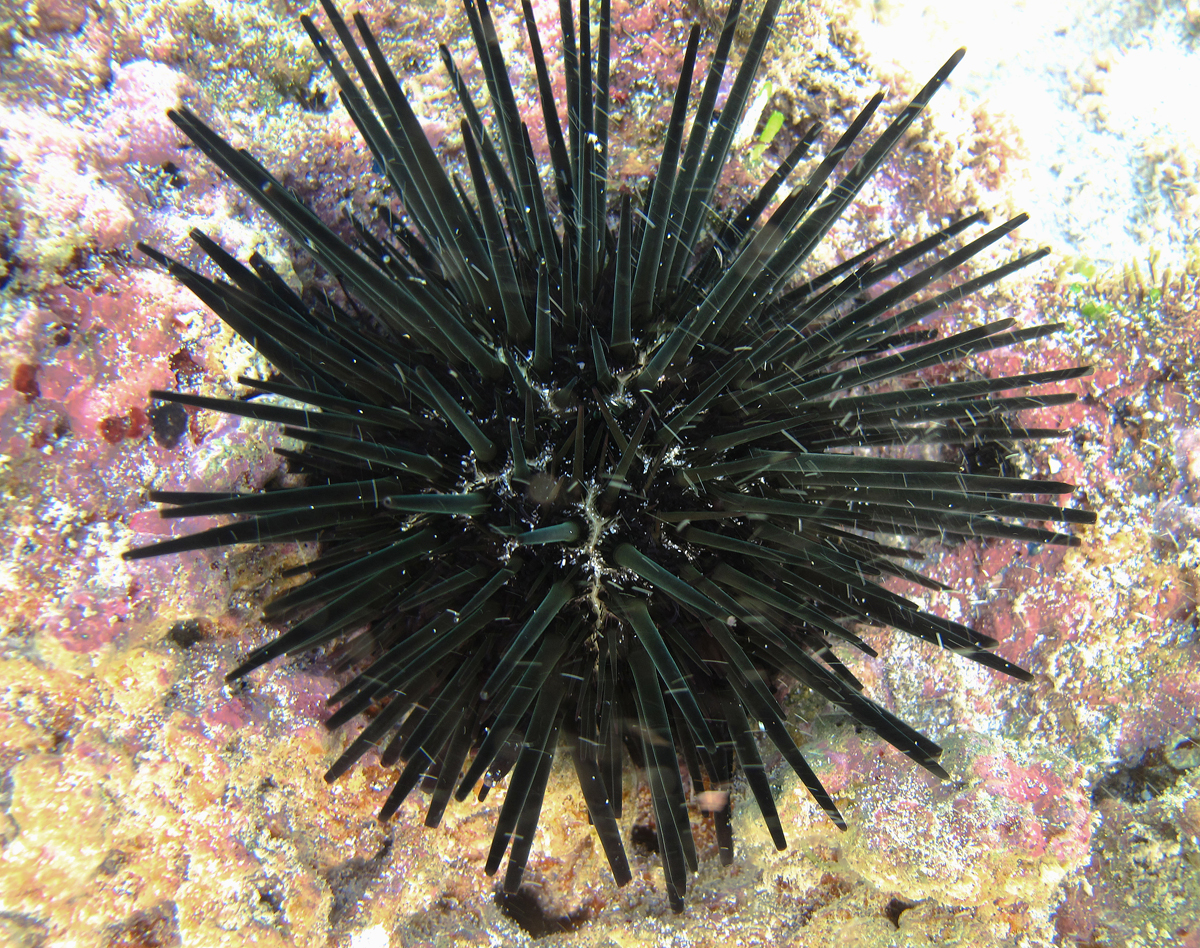
The five zig-zag sutures are visible.

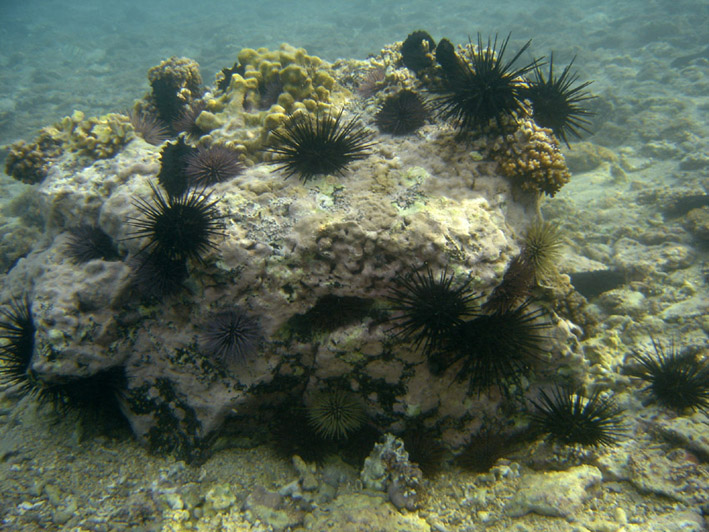
Stomopneustes variolaris in Réunion island (along with some Echinometra mathaei).

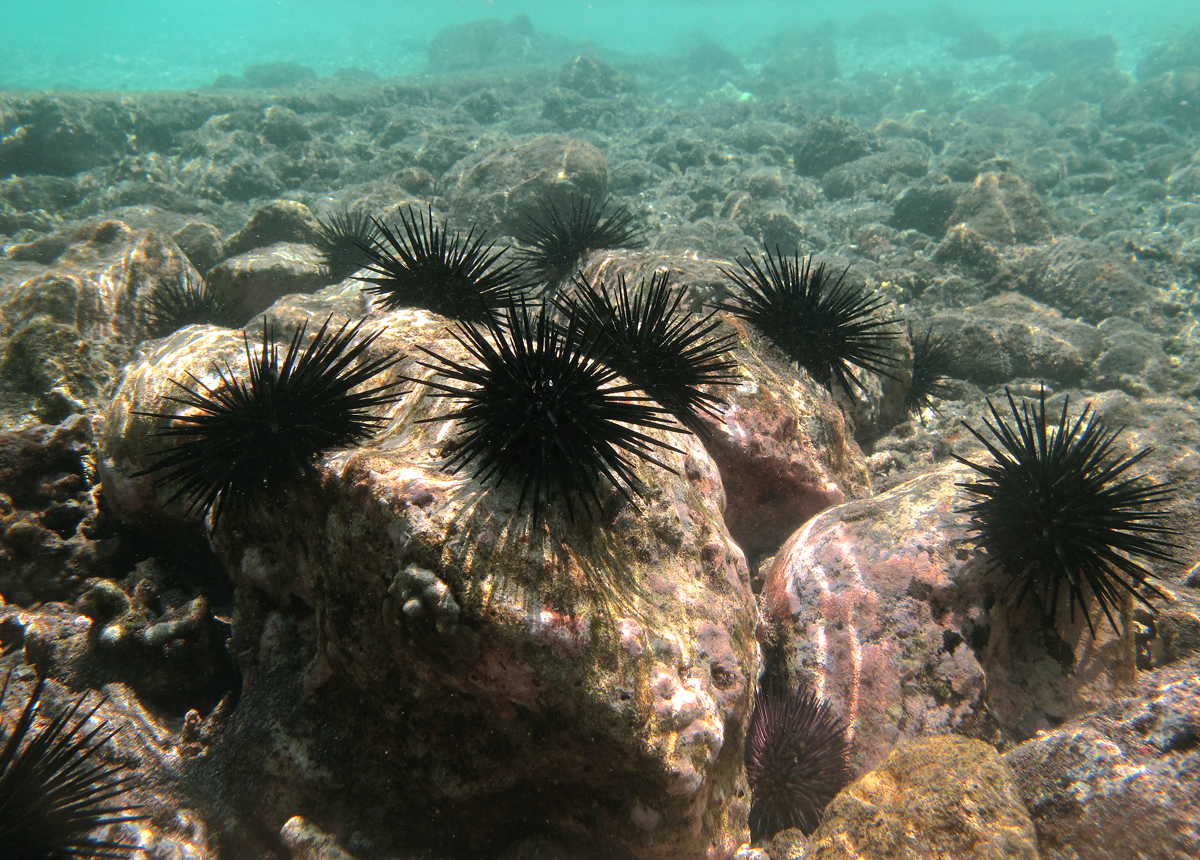
idem

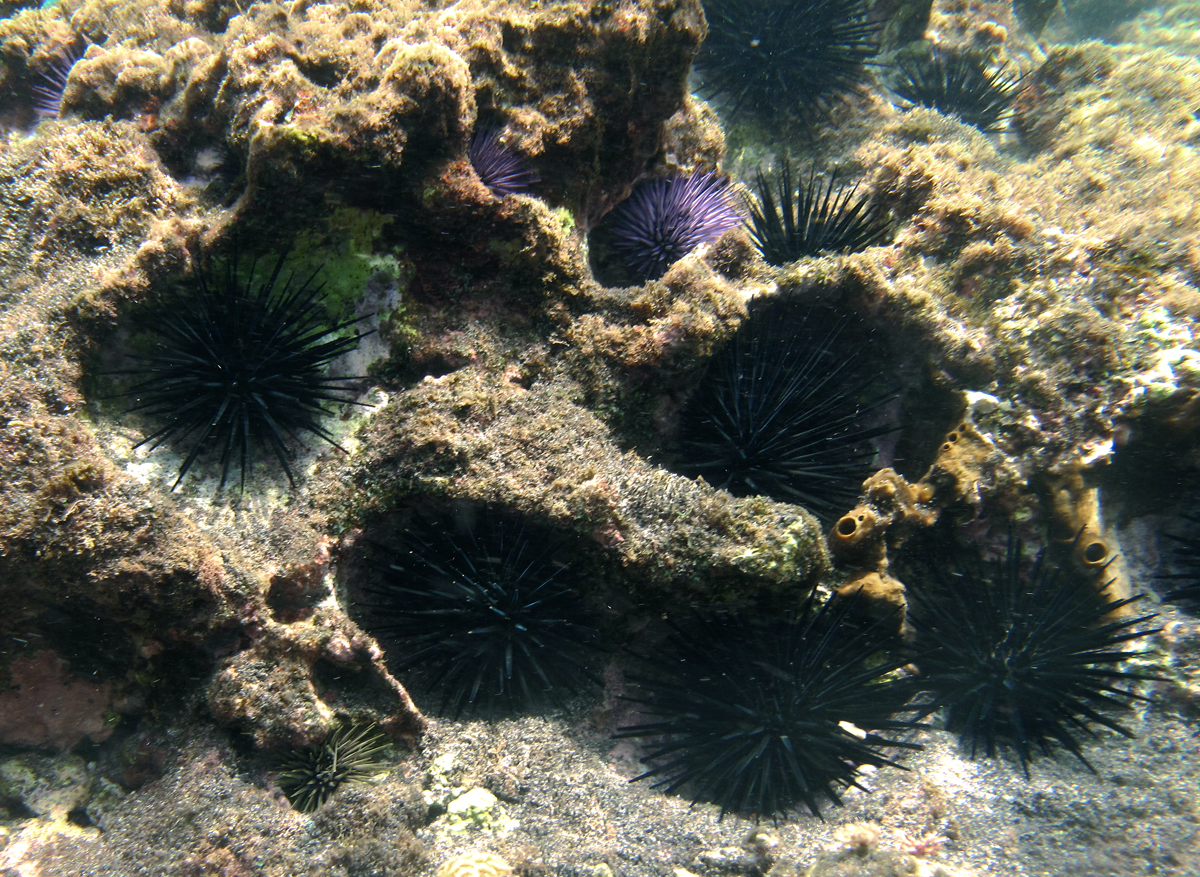
Stomopneustes variolaris burrowing in Réunion island

They can be confused with the Diadematidae sea urchins which sho longer and more slender spines, with an anal papilla, or with Echinometra mathaei, which also digs holes but is smaller, with shorter spines and never truly black.

== Habitat and distribution ==
This species shows a remarkably patchy distribution though it can be pretty abundant where they are found. They can be encountered from the east African coast to the Philippines, on rock and damaged reefs, most often in shallow waters but never too close to wave action. They are particularly abundant in Sri Lanka.
