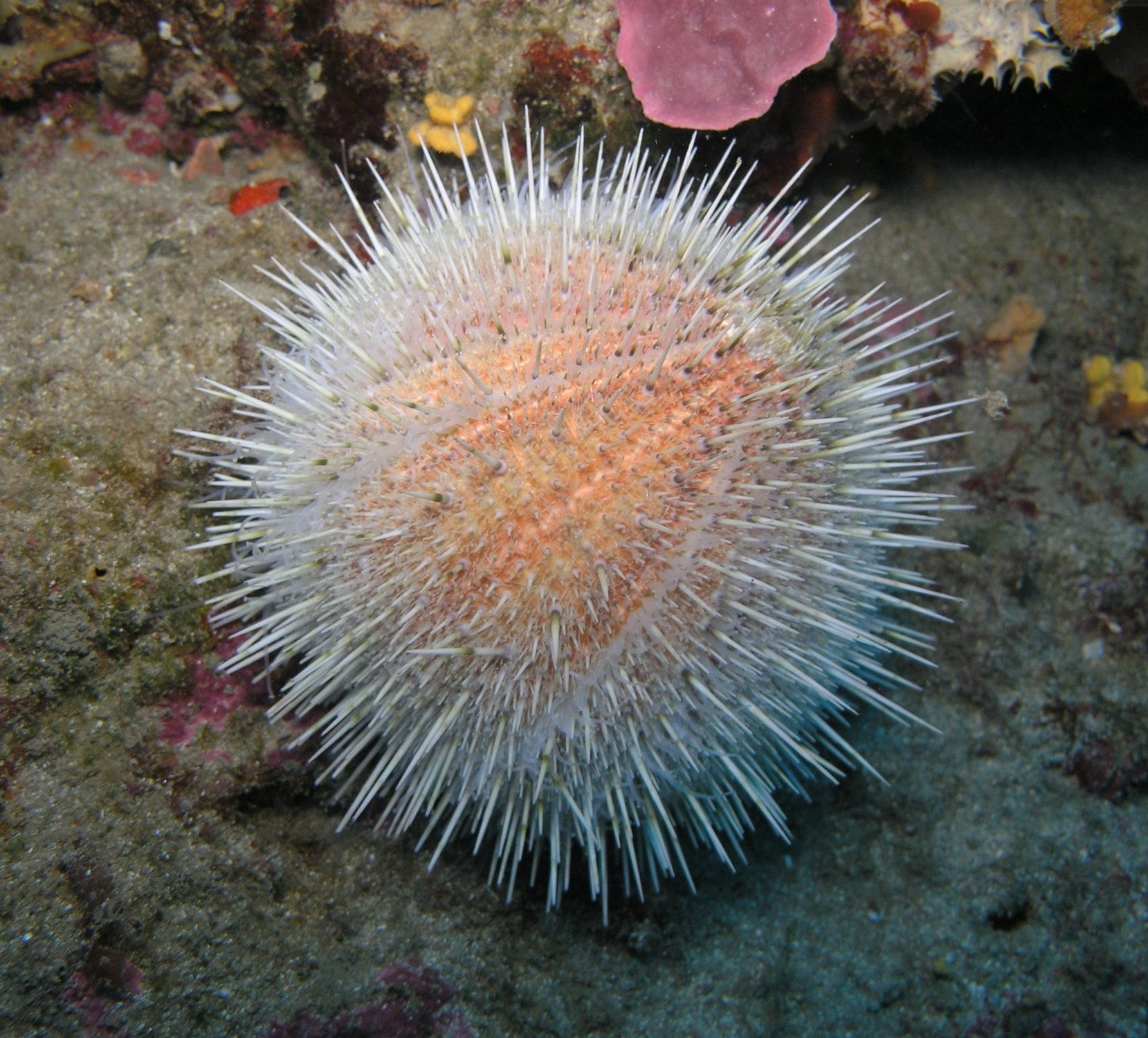
- Echinus melo

Scientific classification
- Kingdom: Animalia
- Phylum: Echinodermata
- Class: Echinoidea
- Infraclass: Carinacea
- Superorder: Echinacea; Claus, 1876

Orders
- See text

= Echinacea (echinoderm) =

Echinacea Temporal range: Lower Jurassic–recent

Superorder of sea urchins

The Echinacea are a superorder of sea urchins. They are distinguished by the presence of a rigid test, with ten buccal plates around the mouth, and solid spines. Unlike some other sea urchins, they also possess gills. The group is a large one, with species found worldwide.

== Child taxa ==
According to World Register of Marine Species:

- Order Arbacioida (Gregory, 1900) -- 1 extant family and 2 fossils
- Order Camarodonta (Jackson, 1912)
  - Infraorder Echinidea (Kroh & Smith, 2010) -- 5 extant families
  - Infraorder Temnopleuridea (Kroh & Smith, 2010) -- 2 extant families and 2 fossils
- Order Stomopneustoida (Kroh & Smith, 2010) -- 2 extant families and 1 fossil
- Family Glyphopneustidae Smith & Wright, 1993 †
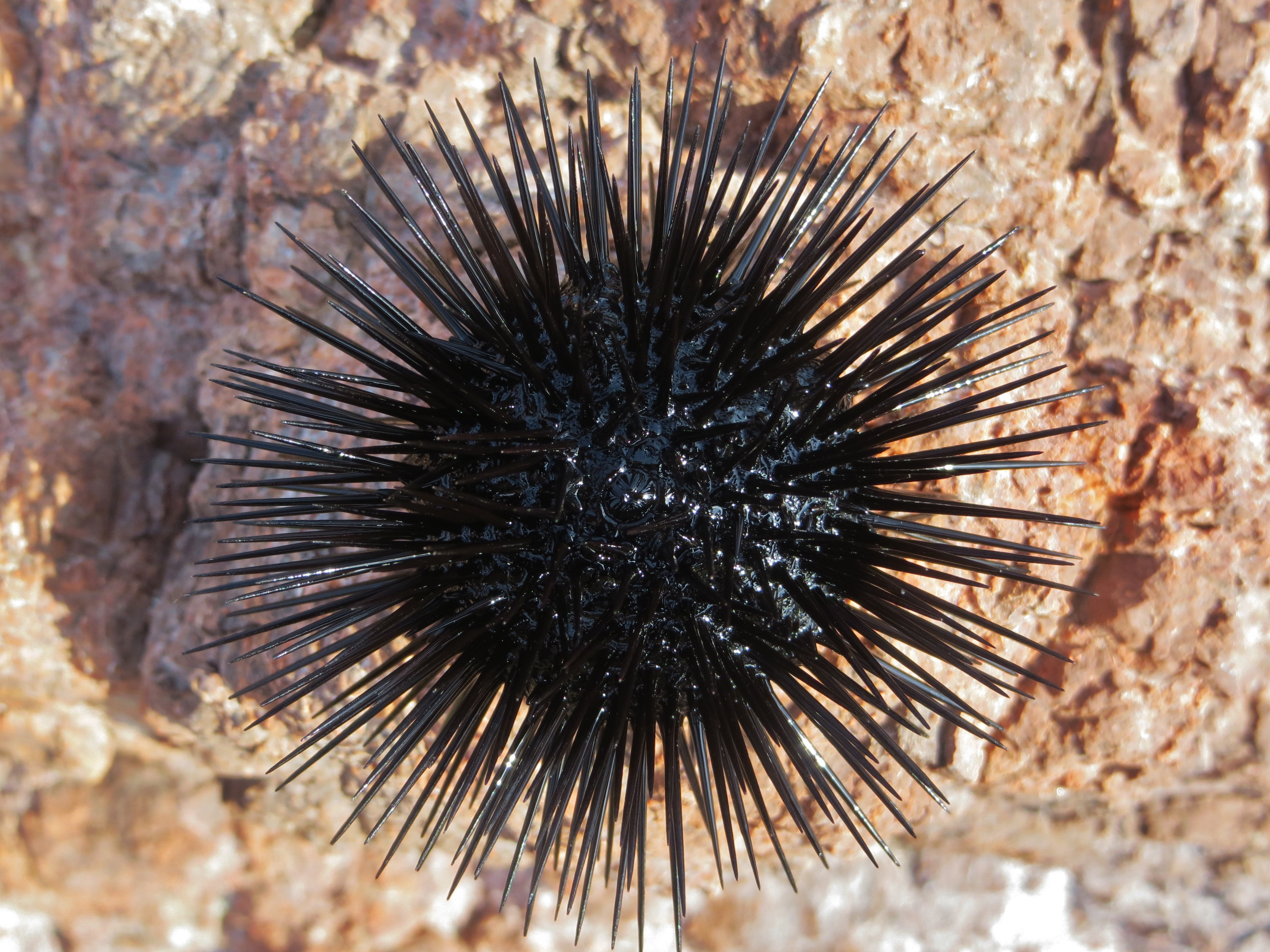
Arbacia lixula,
an Arbacioida

Paracentrotus lividus,
an Echinidea

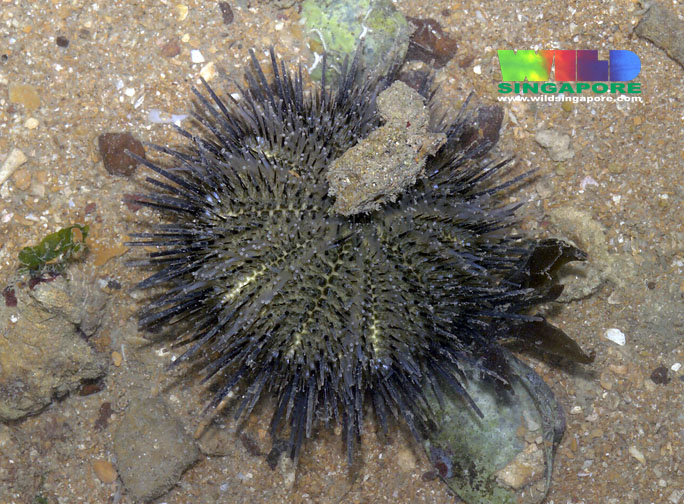
Temnopleurus toreumaticus,
a Temnopleuridea

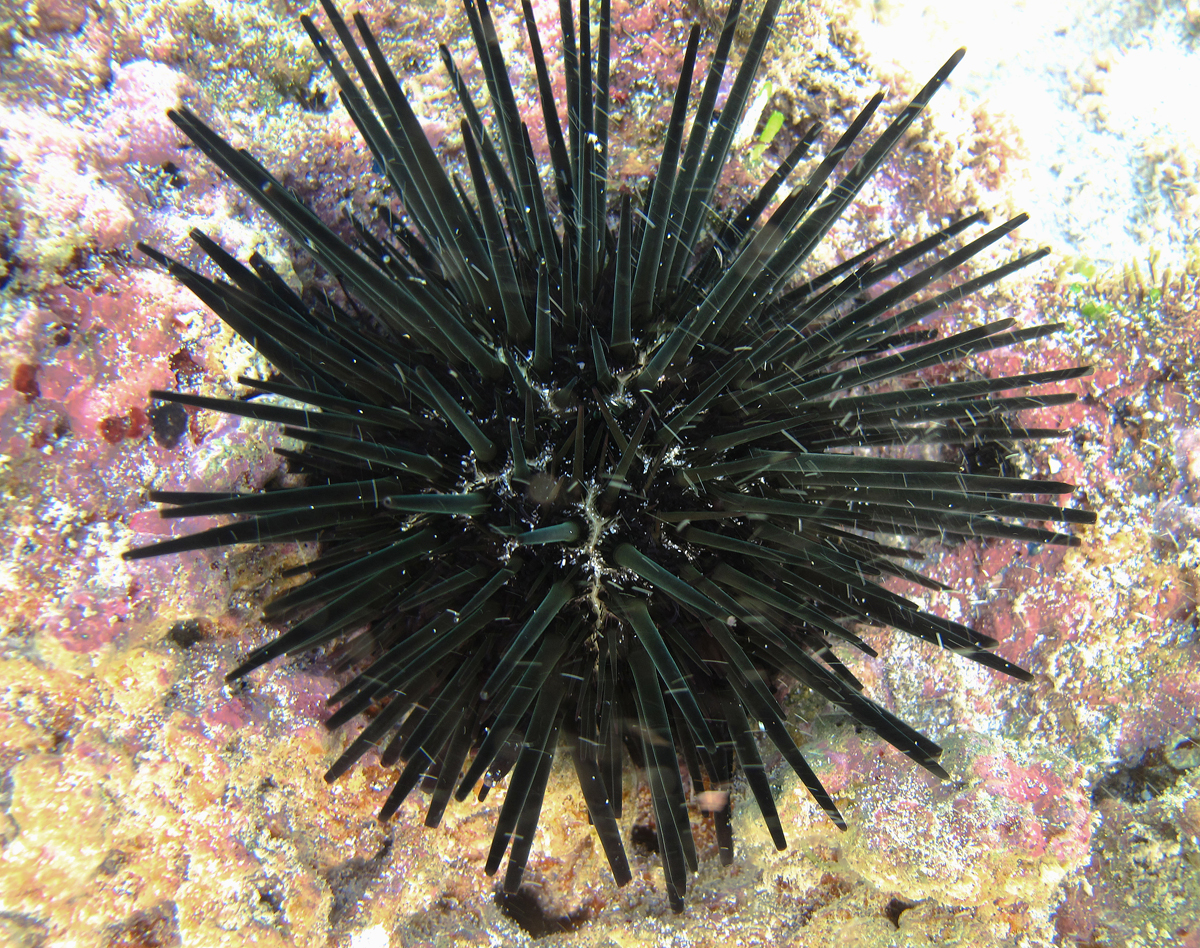
Stomopneustes variolaris,
a Stomopneustoida
