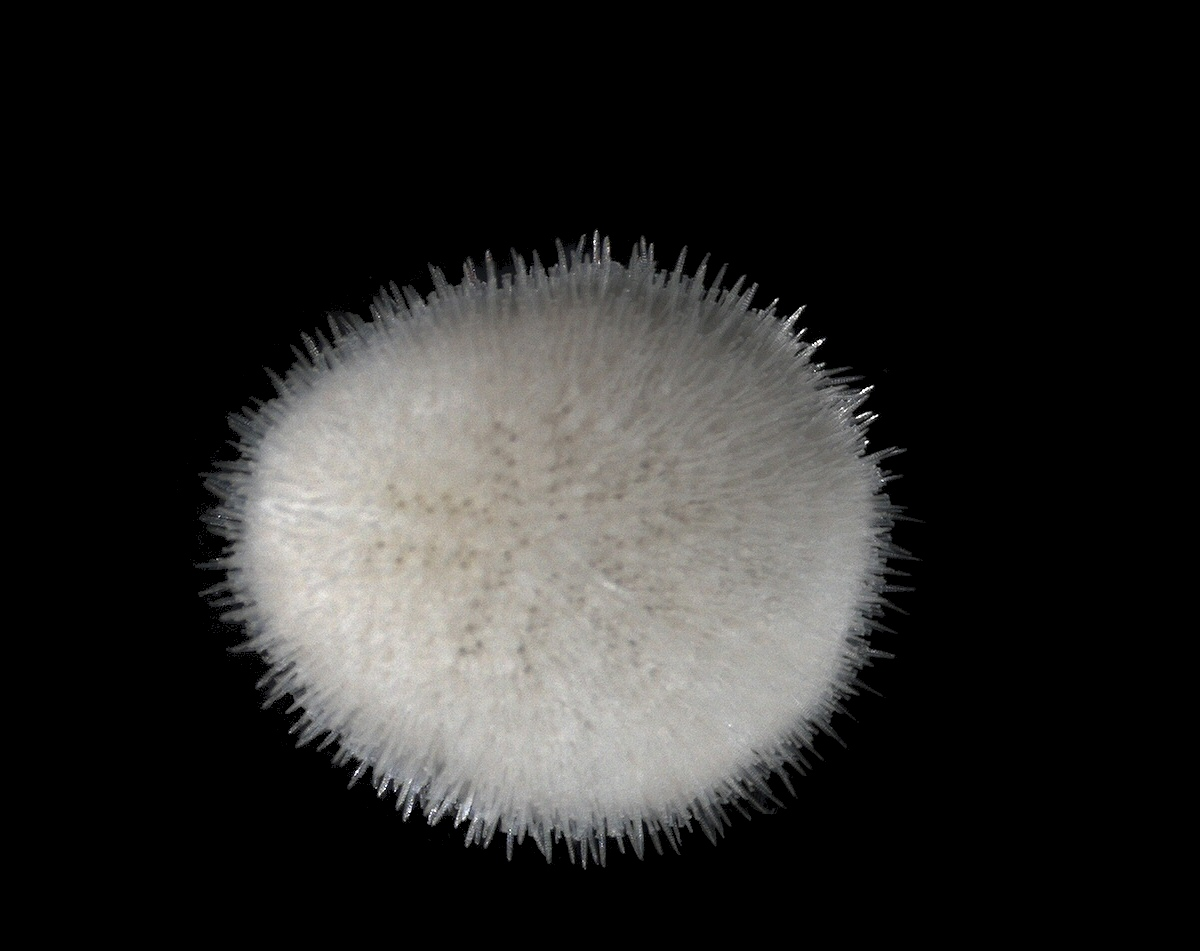
- Echinocyamus pusillus

Scientific classification
- Kingdom: Animalia
- Phylum: Echinodermata
- Class: Echinoidea
- Order: Clypeasteroida
- Family: Fibulariidae; Gray, 1855

Synonyms
- Echinocyamidae

= Fibulariidae =

Family of sand dollars

Fibulariidae is a family of echinoderms belonging to the order Clypeasteroida.

Genera:

- Cyamidia Lambert & Thiery, 1914
- Echinocyamus van Phelsum, 1774
- Fibularia Lamarck, 1816
- Lenicyamidia Brunnschweiler, 1962
- Leniechinus Kier, 1968
- Mortonia Gray, 1851
- Tarphypygus H.L. Clark, 1927
- Thagastea Pomel, 1888
