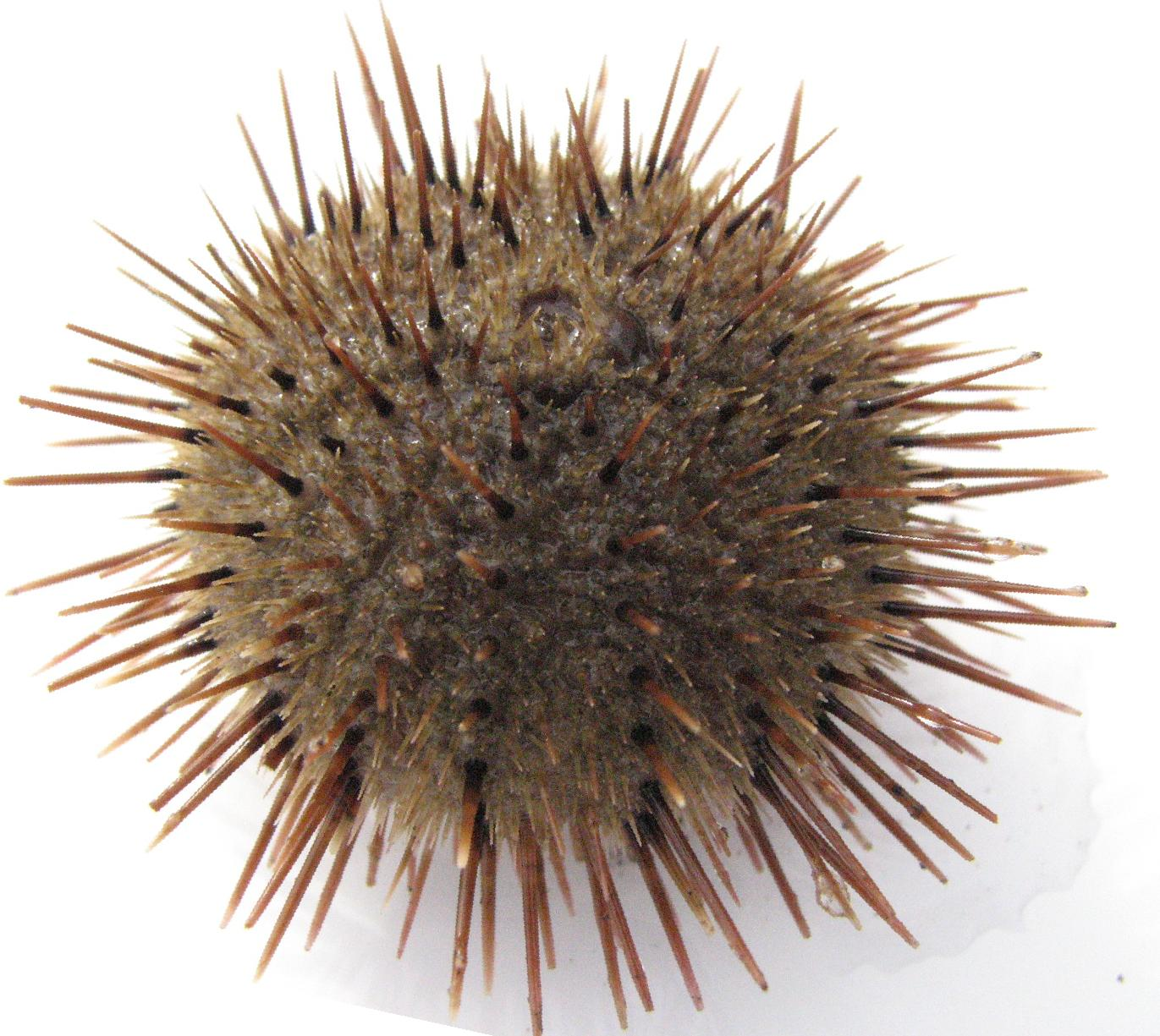
- Glyptocidaris crenularis

Scientific classification
- Kingdom: Animalia
- Phylum: Echinodermata
- Class: Echinoidea
- Superorder: Echinacea
- Order: Stomopneustoida

= Stomopneustoida =

Order of sea urchins

Stomopneustoida is an order of echinoderms belonging to the class Echinoidea.

Families:

- Glyptocidaridae
- Stomechinidae
- Stomopneustidae
