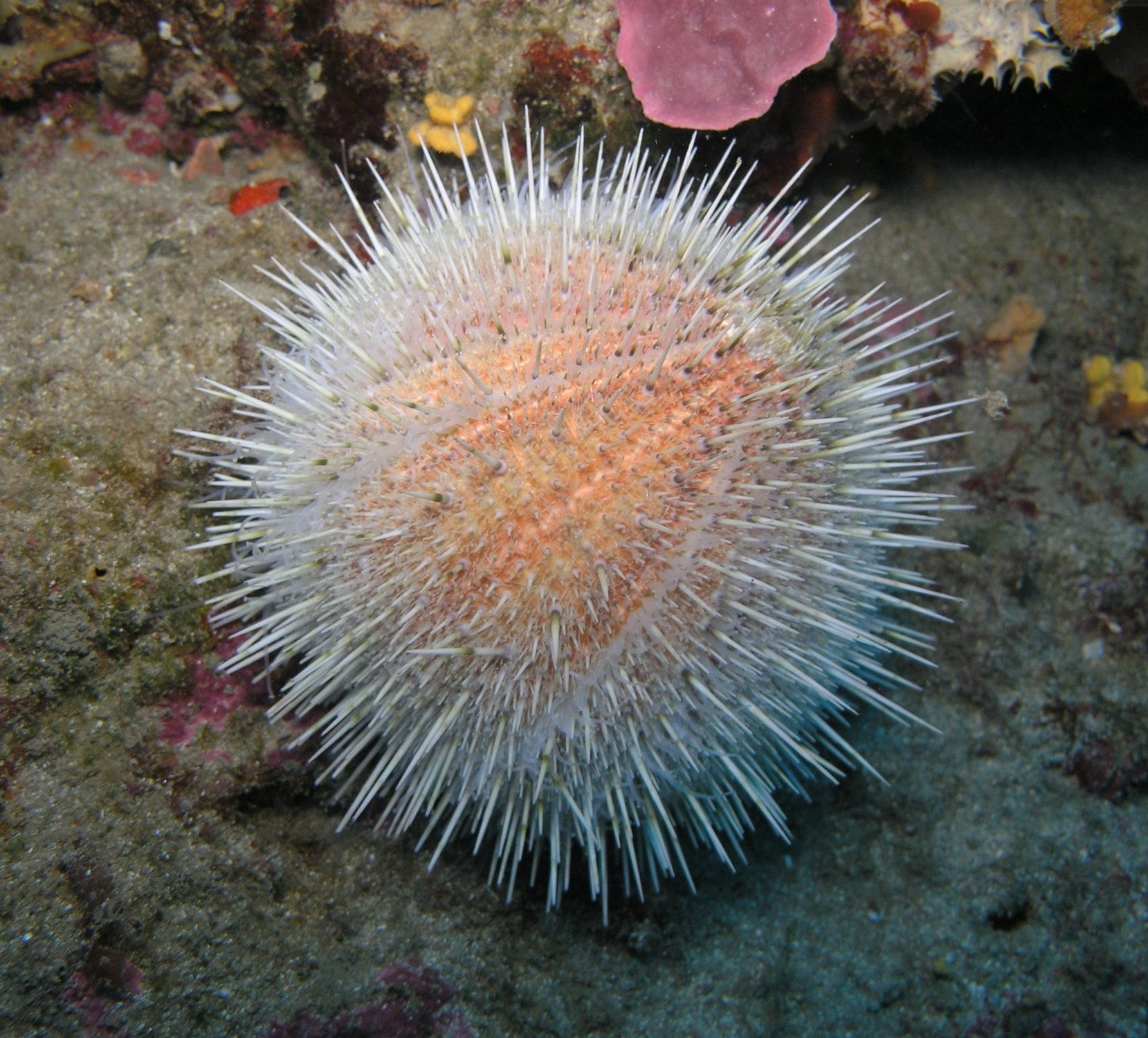
- Echinus melo

Scientific classification
- Kingdom: Animalia
- Phylum: Echinodermata
- Class: Echinoidea
- Superorder: Echinacea
- Order: Echinoida; Troschal, 1872

Families
- See text

= Echinoida =

Echinoida Temporal range: Late Cretaceous–Recent

Order of sea urchins

Echinoida is an order of sea urchins in the class Echinoidea. They are distinguished from other sea urchins by simultaneously possessing both an un-sculpted test and a feeding lantern with large plates fused across the top of each pyramid.

== Taxonomy ==
Order Echinoida

- family Echinidae Gray, 1825
- family Echinometridae Gray, 1825
- family Parasaleniidae
- family Strongylocentrotidae Gregory, 1900
Paracentrotus lividus (Echinidae)

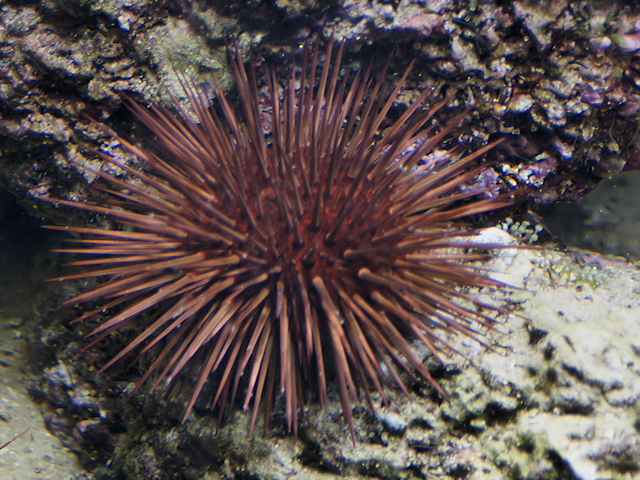
Echinometra lucunter (Echinometridae)

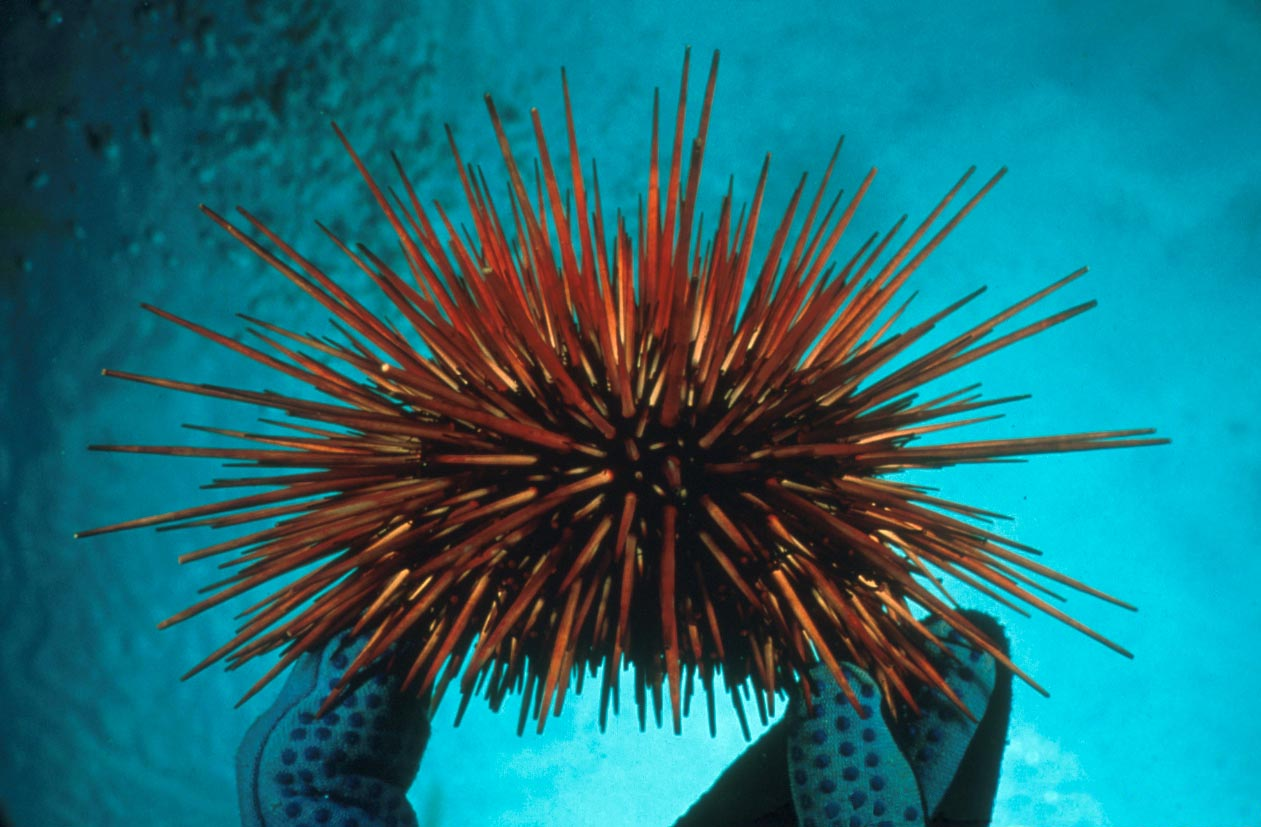
Strongylocentrotus franciscanus (Strongylocentrotidae)

== See also ==
- Colobocentrotus atratus - Shingle urchin
- Echinus acutus - White sea urchin
- Echinus esculentus - Common sea urchin
- Echinus tylodes
- Evechinus chloroticus - New Zealand sea urchin
- Heterocentrotus mammillatus - Red pencil urchin
- Heterocentrotus trigonarius - Slate pencil urchin
- Loxechinus albus - Chilean sea urchin
