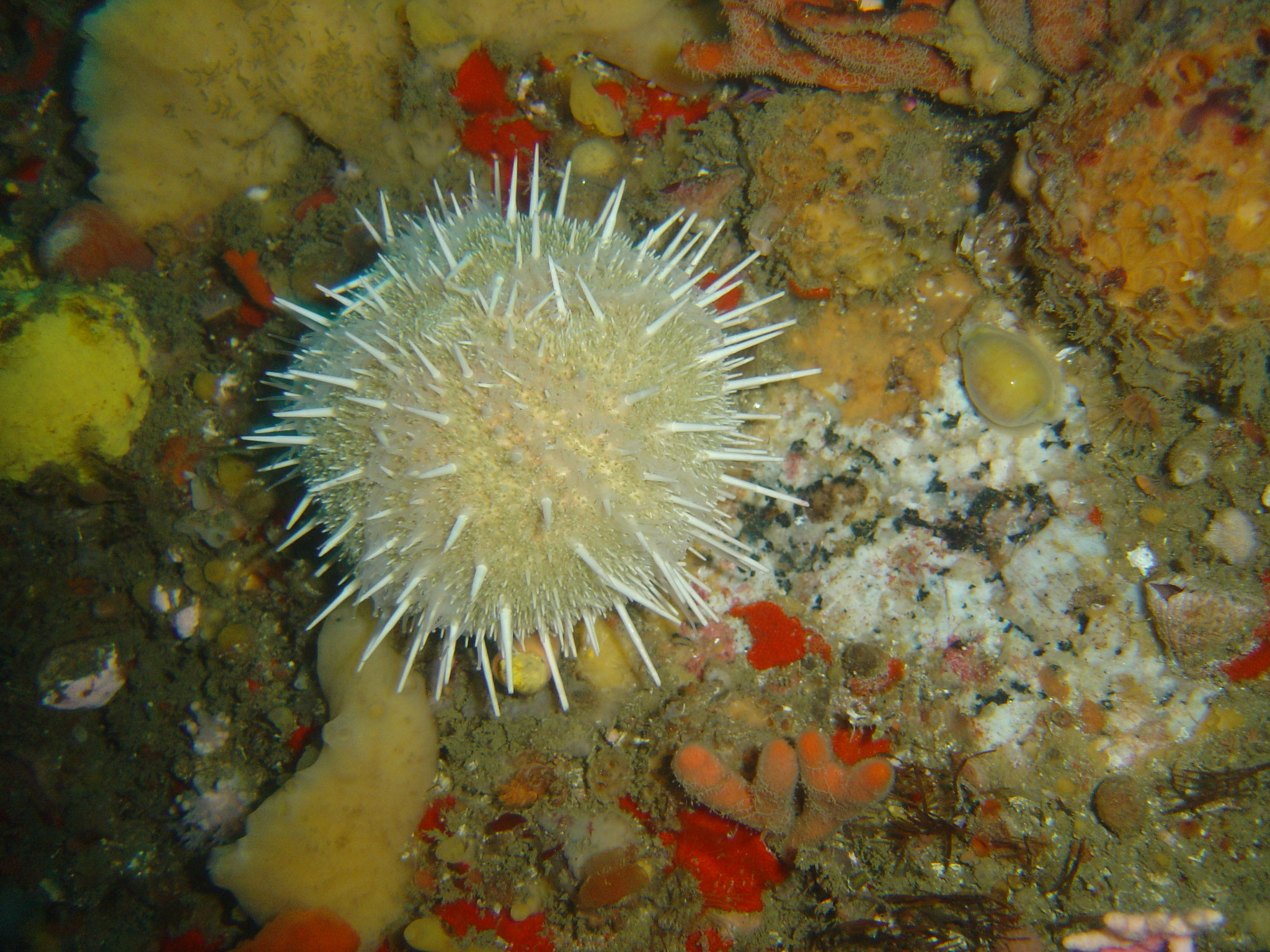

Scientific classification
- Kingdom: Animalia
- Phylum: Echinodermata
- Class: Echinoidea
- Order: Camarodonta
- Family: Echinidae
- Genus: Echinus
- Species: E. gilchristi

Binomial name
- Echinus gilchristi Bell, 1904

Synonyms
- Echinus gilchristi hirsutus Döderlein, 1905; Echinus hirsuta Döderlein, 1905; Echinus hirsutus Döderlein, 1905

= Echinus gilchristi =

Species of sea urchin

Echinus gilchristi, also known by its common name, Gilchrist's sea urchin, is a species of marine invertebrate in the Echinidae family that usually grows to a diameter of 10 cm.
