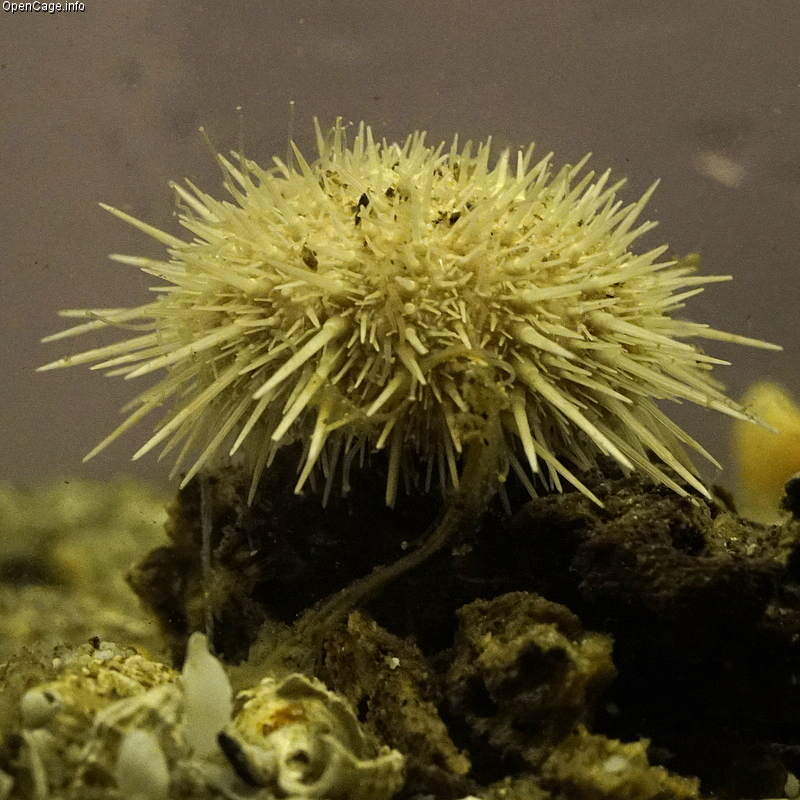

Scientific classification
- Kingdom: Animalia
- Phylum: Echinodermata
- Class: Echinoidea
- Order: Camarodonta
- Family: Echinidae
- Genus: Gracilechinus
- Species: G. lucidus

Binomial name
- Gracilechinus lucidus Döderlein, 1885

Synonyms
- Echinus lucidus Döderlein, 1885; Pseudechinus lucidus Döderlein, 1885

= Gracilechinus lucidus =

Species of sea urchin

Gracilechinus lucidus, is a species of sea urchin in the family Echinidae that is native to the waters of Japan.
