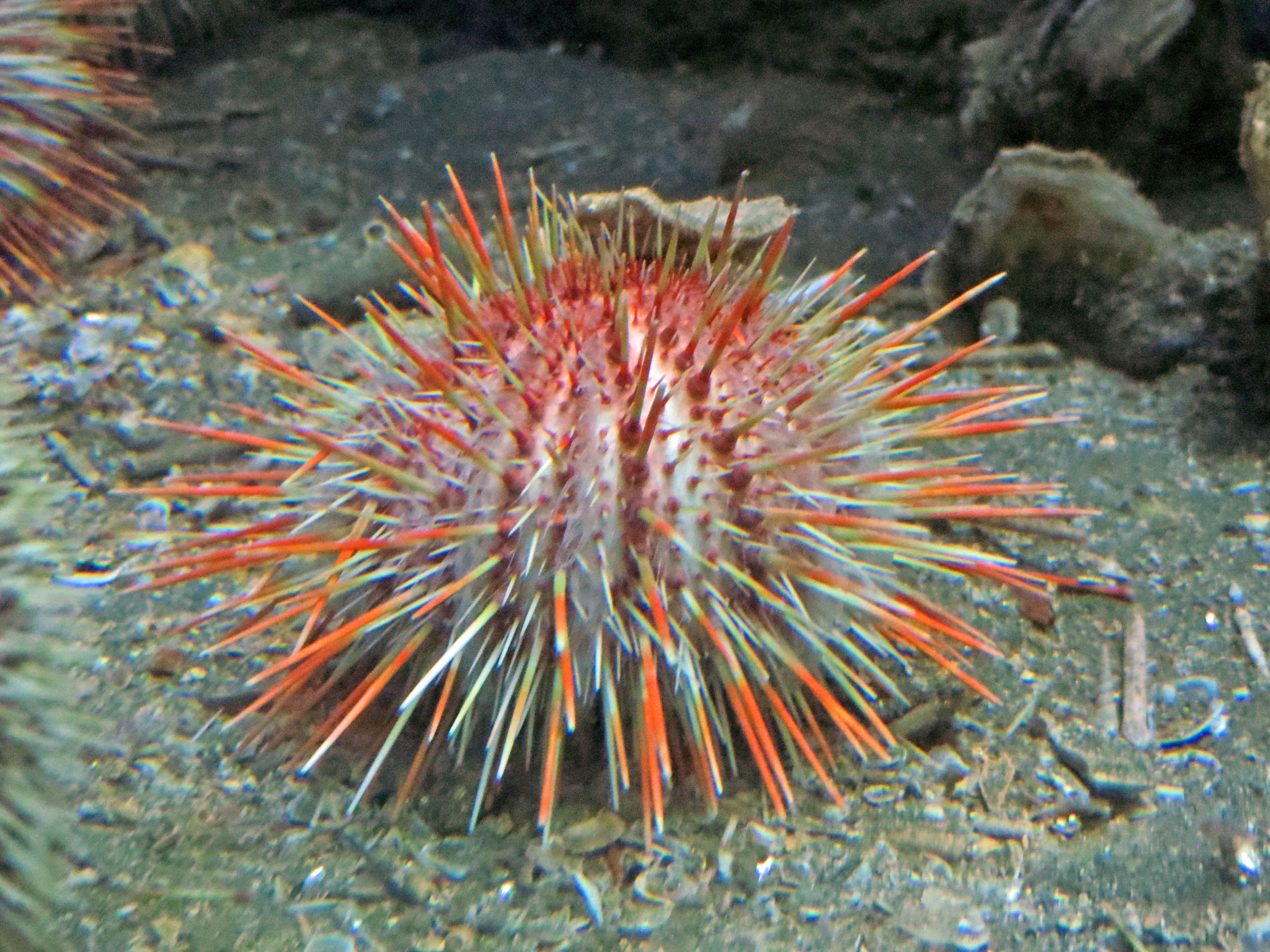
- Gracilechinus acutus at the Biodiversarium of the Observatoire océanologique de Banyuls-sur-Mer

Scientific classification
- Kingdom: Animalia
- Phylum: Echinodermata
- Class: Echinoidea
- Order: Camarodonta
- Family: Echinidae
- Genus: Gracilechinus; Fell & Pawson, 1966

Species
- See text

= Gracilechinus =

Genus of sea urchins

Gracilechinus is a genus of sea urchins in the family Echinidae.

== Description and characteristics ==
The species in this genus are regular sea urchins, with a rounded test, bearing the anus at the top and the mouth at the bottom. They are extremely similar to species in the genus Echinus, but are differentiated by a primary tubercle on every interambulacral plate.

Most species in this genus are abyssal, and live in the North Atlantic or close cold seas.

== Species ==
Species in this genus include:

Image	Scientific name	Distribution
	Gracilechinus acutus (Lamarck, 1816)	Europe (Mediterranean and Atlantic)
	Gracilechinus affinis (Mortensen, 1903)	center Atlantic
	Gracilechinus alexandri (Döderlein & Koren, 1883)	Northern Atlantic
	Gracilechinus atlanticus (Mortensen, 1903)	Atlantic
	Gracilechinus elegans (Düben & Koren, 1844)	North-east Atlantic
	Gracilechinus gracilis (Agassiz, 1869)	Caribbean
	Gracilechinus lucidus (Döderlein, 1885)	North-west Pacific
	Gracilechinus stenoporus (Mortensen, 1942)	South Africa

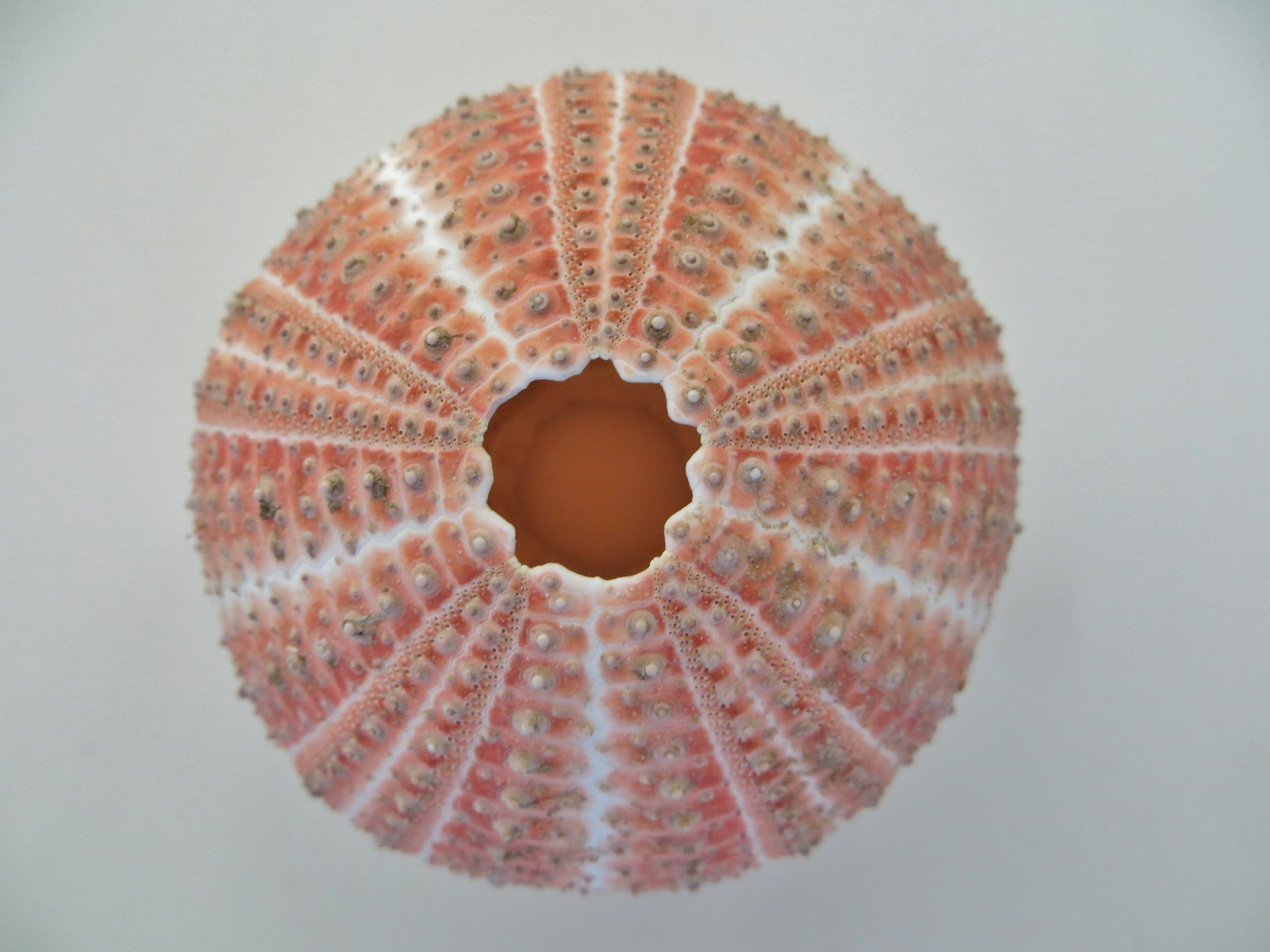
Test of a Gracilechinus acutus
