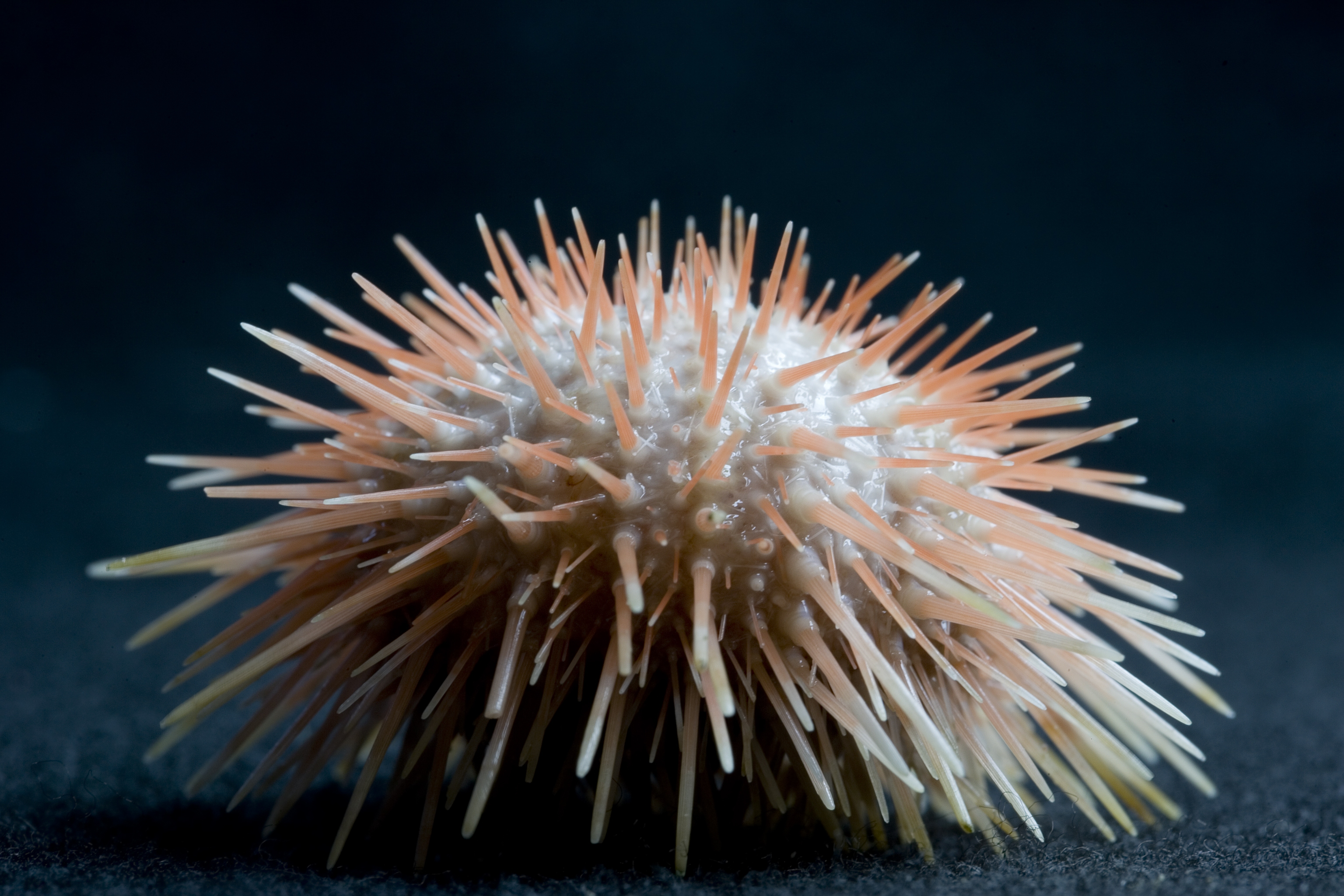

Conservation status
- Secure (NatureServe)

Scientific classification
- Kingdom: Animalia
- Phylum: Echinodermata
- Class: Echinoidea
- Order: Camarodonta
- Family: Echinidae
- Genus: Echinus
- Species: E. tylodes

Binomial name
- Echinus tylodes Clark, 1912

Synonyms
- Pseudechinus tylodes (Clark, 1912)

= Echinus tylodes =

Species of sea urchin

Echinus tylodes is a species of sea urchin in the Echinidae family. It is white with rather sparse pink spines, and is endemic to the eastern coast of North America including the Gulf of Mexico.

== Description ==
Echinus tylodes has a subglobular test about two-thirds as high as it is wide and grows to a diameter of 10 cm (4 in). The joints between the ambulacral plates and the pores through which the tube feet project are both sunken below the general surface of the test. The tubercles to which the primary spines are attached are slightly raised, making it appear as if they are on vertical ridges. The primary spines are short and stout, and the test is easily visible as few secondary spines occur. The general colour of this urchin is white and it has pink spines.

== Distribution and habitat ==
Echinus tylodes is found on the East Coast of the United States from Cape Cod southwards to the Straits of Florida and in the Gulf of Mexico. It is a deepwater species, being found at depths of 270 to 810 metres (890 to 2,660 ft). It is often found around deepwater corals, sitting on the coral branches or around coral mounds among the remains of dead corals.

== Biology ==
Most deepwater echinoderms feed on algal debris and detritus. Examination of the gut contents of this species also showed small shells and the skeletons of hydroids. The eggs are small, which implies this species has echinopluteus larvae which are planktonic.

== Ecology ==
A deepwater video survey of the seabed over the Cape Fear coral mound off North Carolina found the sea urchins E. tylodes and the rather similar Echinus gracilis associated with squat lobsters (Eumunida picta) and spider crabs (Rochinia crassa). These were living among the living and dead remains of the coldwater coral (Lophelia pertusa) from which the mound was largely formed. Other invertebrates present included the deepwater starfish (Novodinia antillensis) and the flytrap anemone (Actinoscyphia saginata). The commonest fish species were the alfonsino (Beryx decadactylus), codlings (Laemonema spp.) and the conger eel (Conger oceanicus).
