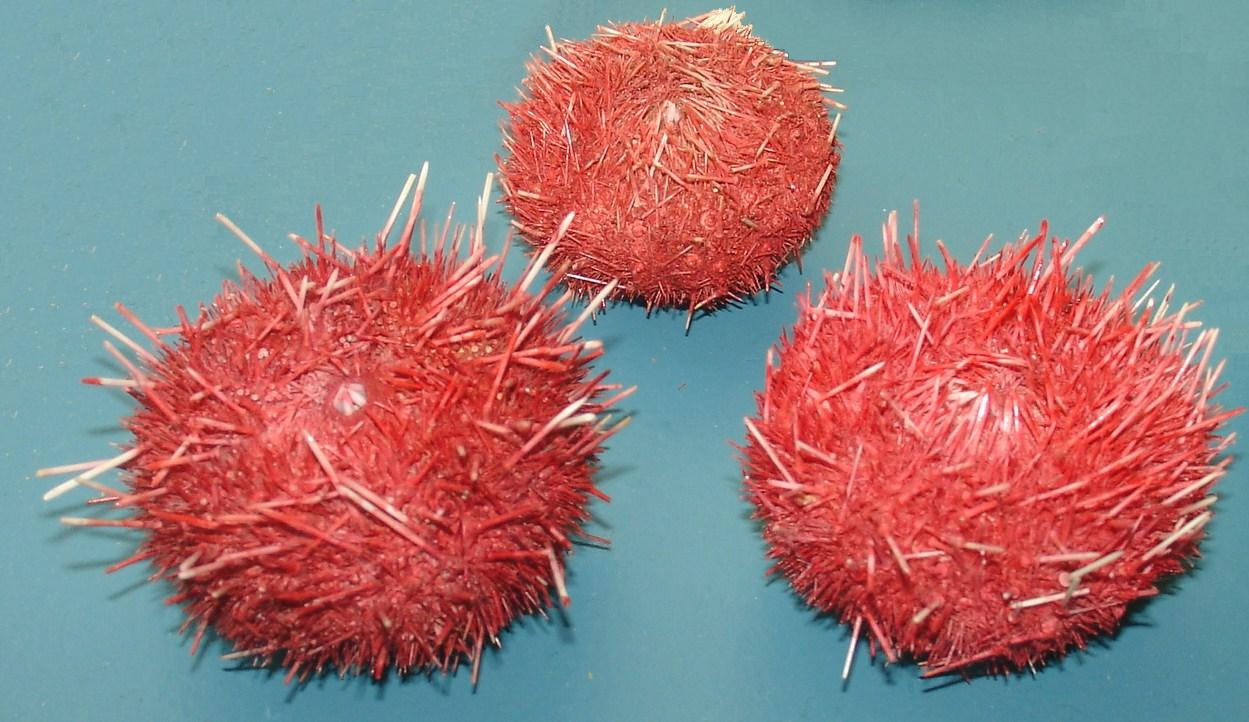

Scientific classification
- Kingdom: Animalia
- Phylum: Echinodermata
- Class: Echinoidea
- Order: Camarodonta
- Family: Echinidae
- Genus: Sterechinus
- Species: S. neumayeri

Binomial name
- Sterechinus neumayeri (Meissner, 1900)

Synonyms
- Sterechinus neumayer

= Sterechinus neumayeri =

Species of sea urchin

Sterechinus neumayeri, the Antarctic sea urchin, is a species of sea urchin in the family Echinidae. It is found living on the seabed in the waters around Antarctica. It has been used as a model organism in the fields of reproductive biology, embryology, ecology, physiology and toxicology.

== Molecular phylogeny ==
The mitochondrial DNA of the Antarctic sea urchin and several other urchins found in the circumpolar region was examined in order to assess their phylogenetic relationships. It was found that Sterechinus neumayeri was most closely related to Paracentrotus lividus and Loxechinus albus, both of which are found in the southernmost part of South America. The divergence of the three species began 35 to 25 million years ago, which coincides with the period at which Antarctica became separated from South America.

== Description ==
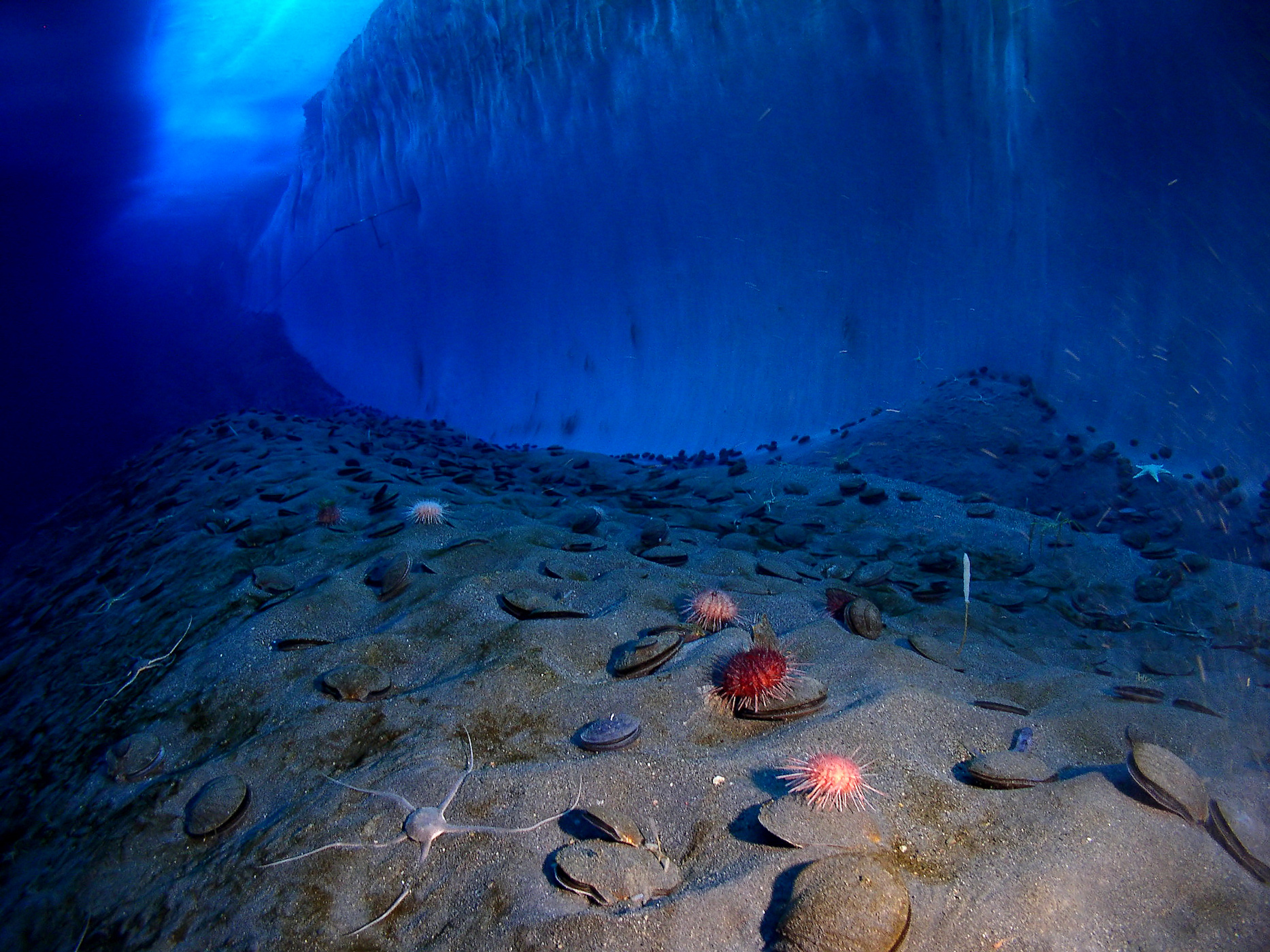
Underwater photo from McMurdo Sound with an ice wall behind and several Antarctic sea urchins, many Antarctic scallops and a brittle star, Ophionotus victoriae.

The Antarctic sea urchin ranges in color from bright red to dull purple and can grow to 5 centimetres (2.0 in) in diameter. The test is globular with vertical rows of long, strong, white-tipped spines between which there is a dense covering of smaller spines and vertical rows of tube feet. The spines and tube feet enable the animal to move across the ground. There are often fragments of red algae adhering to the spines.

== Distribution ==
The Antarctic sea urchin is found in circumpolar waters including the Southern Ocean, the Balleny Islands, South Georgia and the South Sandwich Islands, Terra Nova Bay and Victoria Land. Most of the specimens found have been in water down to a depth of about 250 metres (820 ft).

== Biology ==
The Antarctic sea urchin largely feeds on diatoms and other algae. It also consumes foraminiferans, amphipods, bryozoans, hydrozoans, polychaete worms and sponges and also seal faeces when available.

The Antarctic sea urchin is often found living in association with the Antarctic scallop, Adamussium colbecki and the seastar, Odontaster validus.

== Research ==
=== Metabolism ===
Metabolic processes tend to slow down as the temperature decreases and the Antarctic sea urchin lives in an extremely cold environment. A research study has found that the larvae use energy 25 times more efficiently than other organisms do. Mature urchins were collected from under the sea ice and moved to a research laboratory at McMurdo Sound where they were induced to spawn. Over 10 million embryos were used to test the protein turnover rates and the associated changes in metabolic rates in the larvae as they developed and this super-efficiency was found. Despite this, it took the larvae a year to develop into juveniles. The mechanism for this energy efficiency was unclear but it was surmised that if it could be transferred through genetic manipulation to other organisms such as clams, oysters or fish, it could transform aquaculture.

=== Global warming ===
A research study examined whether the reproductive capacity of the Antarctic sea urchin and the Antarctic proboscis worm (Parborlasia corrugatus) would cope with the increased ocean acidification that would be likely to accompany global warming. It was found that a lowering of the pH from the normal level of 8.0 to 7.0 had little effect on reproduction in the worm, apart from a slight increase in the number of abnormal later-stage embryos. In the urchin, fertilisation rates were reduced at a pH below 7.3, but only at low sperm concentrations. There was a considerable increase in abnormal embryos at later stages of development under lowered pH conditions. In the case of these two cold water invertebrates, these results were not more significant than those of other example organisms from more temperate regions of the world.
