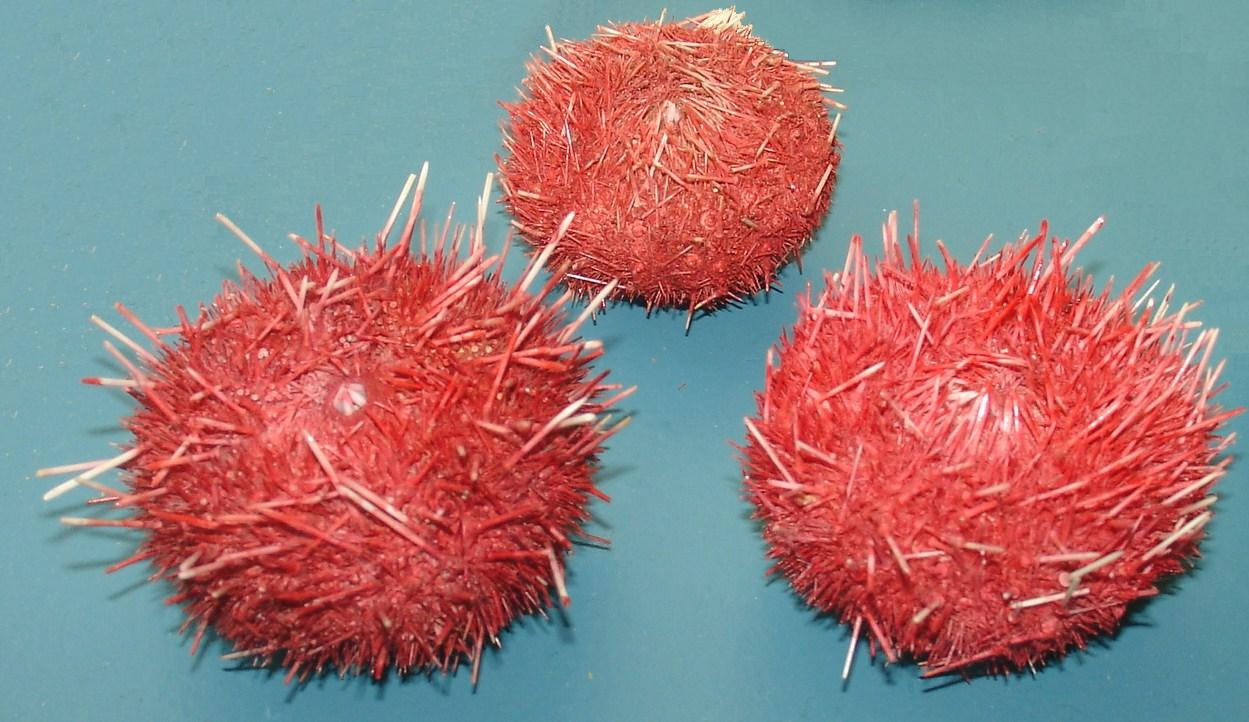
- Sterechinus neumayeri

Scientific classification
- Kingdom: Animalia
- Phylum: Echinodermata
- Class: Echinoidea
- Order: Camarodonta
- Family: Echinidae
- Genus: Sterechinus; Koehler, 1901

Species
- See text

= Sterechinus =

Genus of sea urchins

Sterechinus is a genus of sea urchins in the family Echinidae. All living members of the genus are found in the waters around Antarctica but the first species described in the genus was a fossil and was found in Europe.

== Description ==
Members of the genus Sterechinus have compound ambulacral plates that are trigeminate (composed of three elements). These plates have a primary tubercle articulating with a spine on the middle element, a small secondary tubercle in the interambulacral groove on one side of it and 3 pairs of pores on the other. The tube feet are connected to these pores in the living animal and the pore pairs are arranged in a vertical arc. The sutures between the plates are deeply indented. The area of narrow plates around the mouth is small and the buccal notches are shallowly grooved.

== Species ==
The type species of this genus is Stirechinus scillae which was first described from a fossil by Pierre Desor in 1856. Stirechinus scillae lived from the Late Miocene to the Plio-Pleistocene and further fossils have since been found in France, Sicily and Malta. None of the fossilized urchins so far discovered had any apical plates.

Since then, other members of the genus have been described, all from the waters around Antarctica. The World Register of Marine Species lists the following extant species in the genus:

- Sterechinus agassizii Mortensen, 1910
- Sterechinus antarcticus Koehler, 1901
- Sterechinus bernasconiae Larrain, 1975
- Sterechinus dentifer Koehler, 1926
- Sterechinus diadema (Studer, 1876)
- Sterechinus neumayeri (Meissner, 1900)
