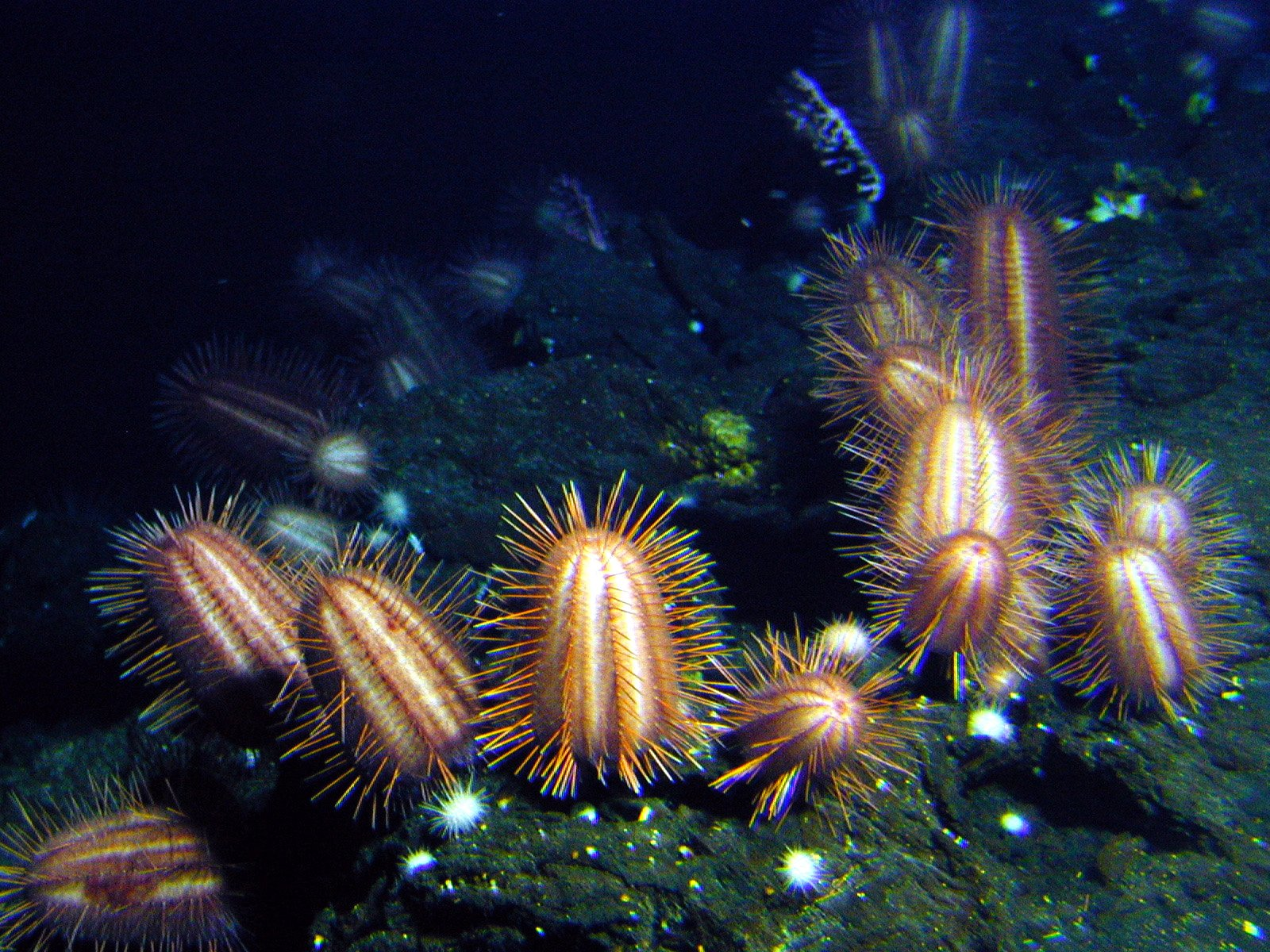
- On the seabed near New Zealand

Scientific classification
- Kingdom: Animalia
- Phylum: Echinodermata
- Class: Echinoidea
- Order: Camarodonta
- Family: Echinidae
- Genus: Dermechinus; Mortensen, 1942
- Species: D. horridus

Binomial name
- Dermechinus horridus (A. Agassiz, 1879)

Synonyms
- Echinus horridus A. Agassiz, 1879; Pseudechinus horridus (A. Agassiz, 1879); Sterechinus horridus (A. Agassiz, 1879)

= Dermechinus =

Genus of sea urchins

Dermechinus is a genus of sea urchin in the family Echinidae found in deep water in the southern Indian, Pacific and Atlantic Oceans. It is monotypic, with Dermechinus horridus, sometimes called the cactus urchin, being the only species.

== Taxonomy ==
The species was first described in 1879 as Echinus horridus by the American zoologist Alexander Agassiz, after being dredged from the deep seabed during the Challenger expedition of 1872–1876. In 1942, it was allocated to the newly erected genus Dermechinus by the Danish zoologist Ole Theodor Jensen Mortensen, a specialist in sea urchins.

== Description ==
An unusual-looking bright-orange sea urchin, Dermechinus horridus is globular when young but sometimes grows to a height more than twice its width. The fine long spines grow in vertical rows and are interspersed with a dense mat of shorter ones. Pedicellariae and tube feet are also present, and the general appearance of the sea urchin is similar to a cylindrical cactus.

== Distribution ==
D. horridus has a global but discontinuous distribution on the continental slope in oceans in the southern hemisphere; this includes Chile, South Africa, Australia and New Zealand. The depth range of this sea urchin is 180 to 560 m (600 to 1,800 ft).

== Ecology ==
This sea urchin tends to perch on rocks, in rows at right angles to the current, and has a relatively small mouth, leading to the speculation that it might be a filter feeder, an unusual feeding method among sea urchins. Commenting on this suggestion, sea urchin expert F. Julian Fell pointed out that Dermechinus horridus lived in zooplankton-rich waters and that its upright posture resembled that of a filter-feeding sea cucumber; the long spines formed combs and the short spines would be suitable for transporting small particles to the mouth at the base of the animal, with the tiny jaws adequate for ingesting them. So this feeding method is a possibility, but direct observation is needed.
