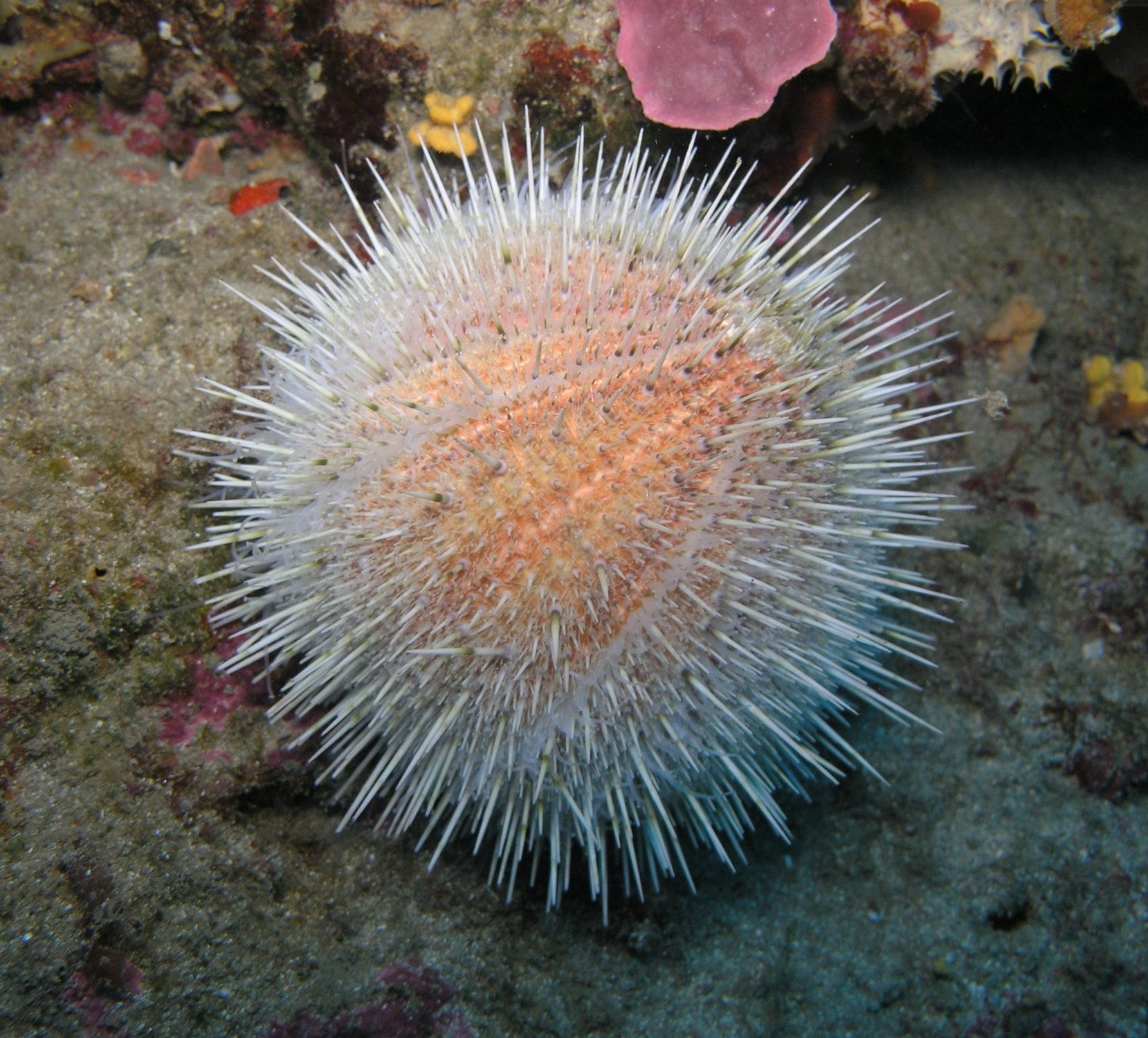

Scientific classification
- Kingdom: Animalia
- Phylum: Echinodermata
- Class: Echinoidea
- Order: Camarodonta
- Family: Echinidae
- Genus: Echinus
- Species: E. melo

Binomial name
- Echinus melo Lamarck, 1816

= Echinus melo =

Species of sea urchin

Echinus melo, melon sea urchin, is a species of sea urchin in the family Echinidae.

== Description ==
This species grows up to 17 cm (7 in) in diameter. It is spherical or slightly cone-shaped, and the colour of the test is mainly pinkish, yellowish, or greenish-yellow, and banded with white and pale brown, giving it a segmented appearance. The long primary spines are few in number and olive green with pale tips. They grow in a single row on each ambulacral plate. The much shorter secondary spines are yellowish green and are densely packed in several rows.

== Distribution ==
The melon sea urchin is found in the Mediterranean Sea and the eastern Atlantic Ocean between the Azores and the Bay of Biscay, and occasionally as far north as Ireland and Cornwall.

== Biology ==
Echinus melo is mainly a herbivore, grazing on algae, but it also consumes small invertebrates.

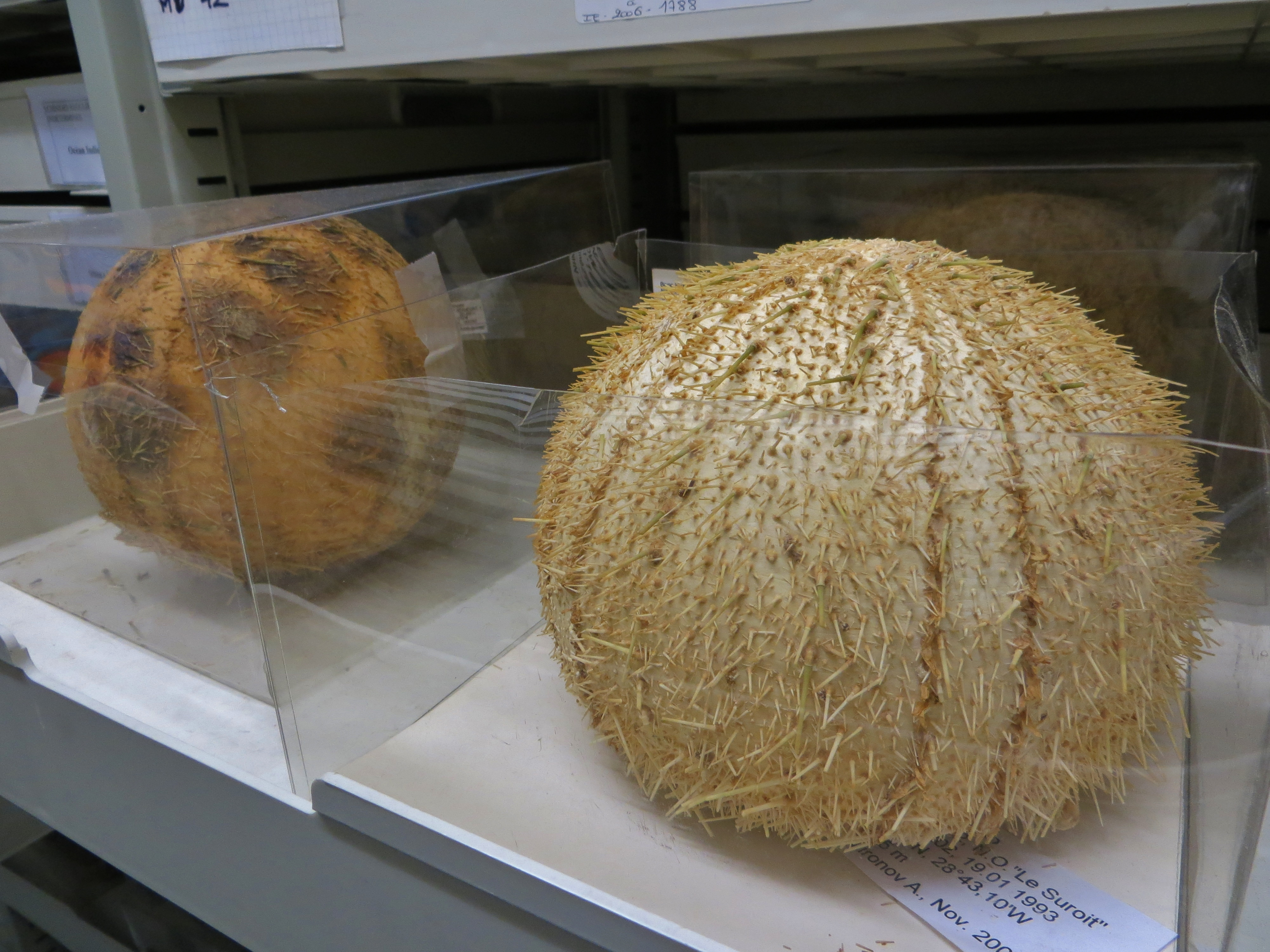
Specimens from the Muséum National d'Histoire Naturelle in Paris : the likeness with a melon is obvious.
