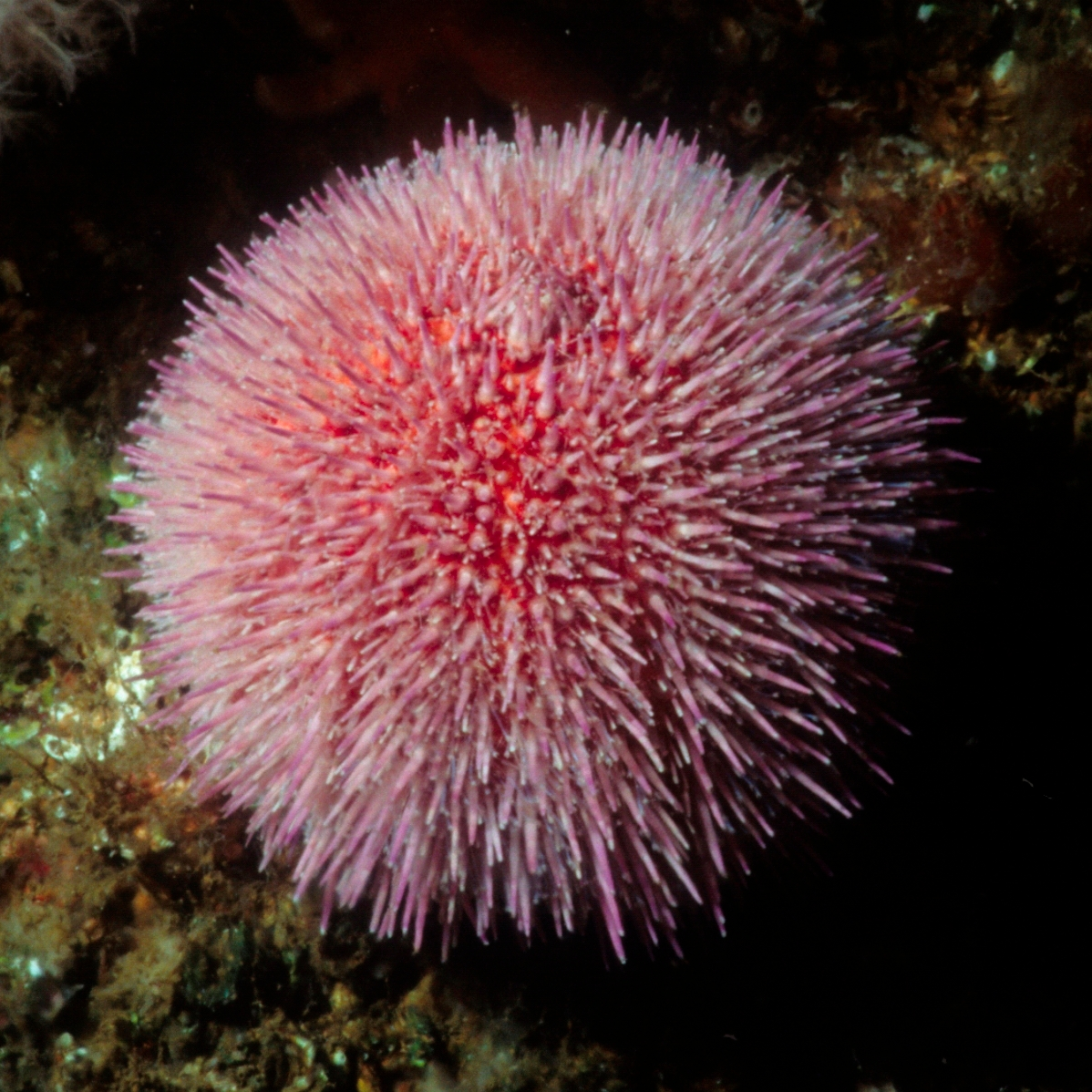

Conservation status
- Near Threatened (IUCN 2.3)

Scientific classification
- Kingdom: Animalia
- Phylum: Echinodermata
- Class: Echinoidea
- Order: Camarodonta
- Family: Echinidae
- Genus: Echinus
- Species: E. esculentus

Binomial name
- Echinus esculentus Linnaeus, 1758

Synonyms
- Cidaris esculenta (Linnaeus, 1758); Cidaris hemisphaera Leske, 1778; Echinus aurantiacus Blainville, 1825; Echinus eſculentus Linnaeus, 1758; Echinus globiformis Lamarck, 1816; Echinus pseudomelo Blainville, 1825; Echinus quinqueangulatus Blainville, 1825; Echinus quinqueangulosus Blainville, 1834; Echinus Schwartzii Nilsson, 1817; Echinus sphaera Müller, 177; Echinus subangulosus Blainville, 1826; Echinus violaceus Blainville, 1825; Sphærechinus esculentus (Linnaeus, 1758)

= Echinus esculentus =

Species of sea urchin

Echinus esculentus, the European edible sea urchin or common sea urchin, is a species of marine invertebrate in the Echinidae family. It is found in coastal areas of western Europe down to a depth of 1,200 m (3,900 ft). It is considered "Near threatened" in the IUCN Red List of Threatened Species.

== Description ==
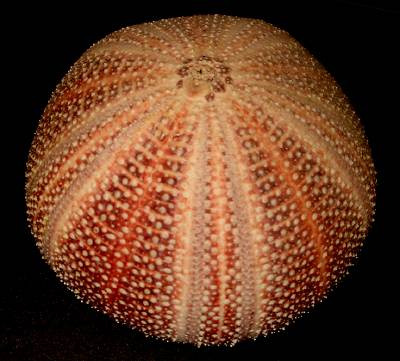
Test of Echinus esculentus

E. esculentus is approximately spherical but slightly flattened at both poles. It is reddish or purplish with white tubercles and grows to about ten centimetres in diameter. The brittle, limy test is rigid and divided into five ambulacral areas separated by five inter-ambulacral areas. There are two rows of plates in each of these areas, making twenty rows of plates in total. The test is covered in spines each articulating with a tubercle. There is a dense covering of secondary spines and a smaller number of longer, primary spines, carried on each second or third ambulacral plate. The spines are blunt ended and usually white with purplish tips. There is a radially symmetrical pattern of holes in the ambulacral areas through which the tube feet emerge. On the buccal plates round the mouth on the underside are pedicellariae, defensive organs like minute pincers, each with two lateral teeth and one terminal tooth. It typically reaches a diameter of 15–16 cm (5.9–6.3 in), but has been recorded to 17.6 cm (6.9 in).

== Distribution ==
In the North Sea, the species is common in all areas with hard substrates. It is found off the coasts of Portugal, Spain, France, Belgium, the Netherlands, Denmark, Norway, Iceland, Sweden, the United Kingdom and Ireland.

== Biology ==
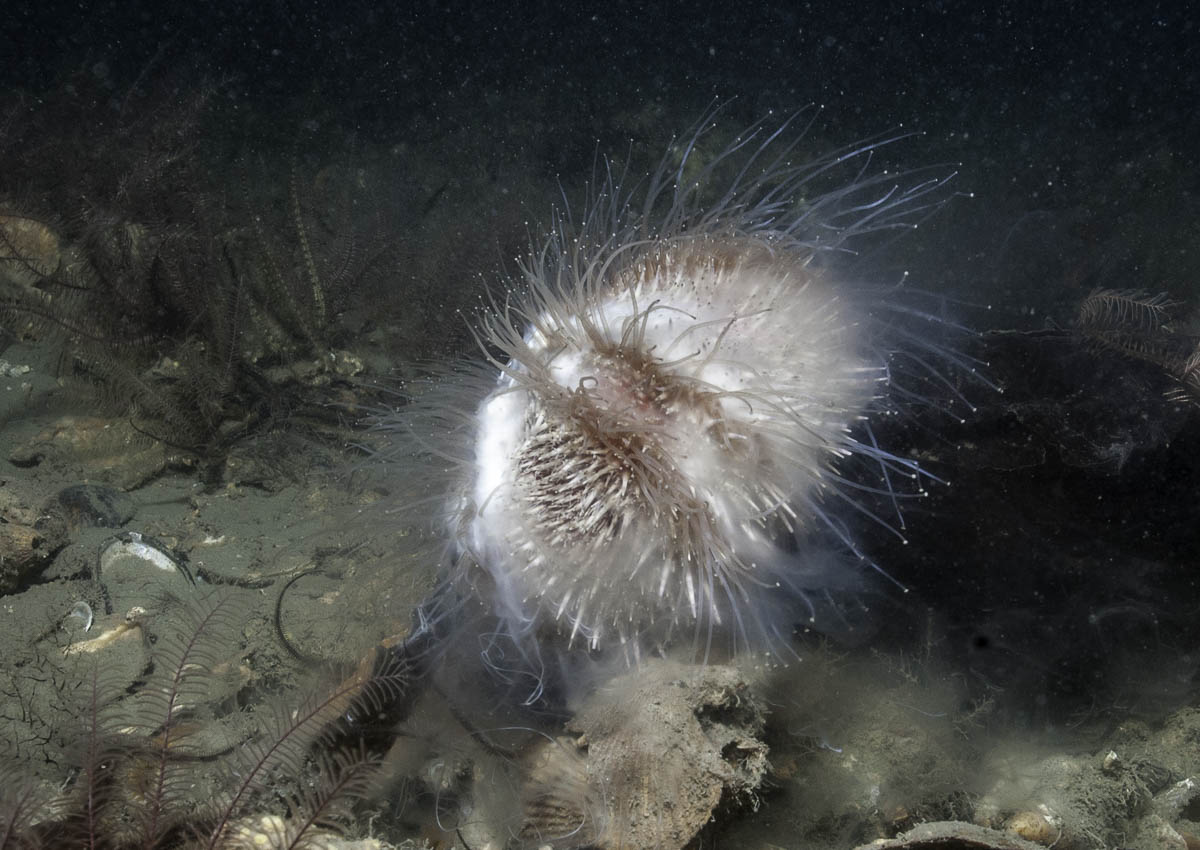
A male sea urchin, Echinus esculentus releasing sperm, Strangford Lough, Northern Ireland.

The mouthparts are designed for rasping and E. esculentus feeds on algae and encrusting invertebrates. It has been recorded feeding on worms, barnacles, hydroids, tunicates, bryozoans, algae such as Laminaria spp., sludge and detritus.

Spawning mainly occurs in the spring and a large female may release about 20 million eggs into the water column. The larvae become part of the plankton, the development of which is complex and takes between forty-five to sixty days in captivity. It includes a blastula, gastrula and a four armed echinopluteus stage that forms an important part of the zooplankton. Settlement mostly occurs in autumn and winter and the largest number of juvenile urchins was found at a greater depth than the kelp zone.

The polychaete worm, Adyte assimilis and the copepod Pseudoanthessius liber are often found living as commensals among its spines and the parasitic copepod, Asterocheres echinola, often infests its gut.

== Use as food ==
The species name esculentus means "edible". Sea urchin roe is used as food around the world, but esculentus is not among the preferred sea urchin species, due to its white gonads. Sea urchin species with orange gonads are preferred. It is not actually the eggs that are eaten but the gonads, both male and female. Fishing for urchins is undertaken off European coasts and the possibility of aquaculture is being investigated. In a study off the west coast of Scotland it was found that feeding a commercially available salmon feed promoted gonadal growth in the urchins and the practicalities of a fully farmed approach were being assessed.
