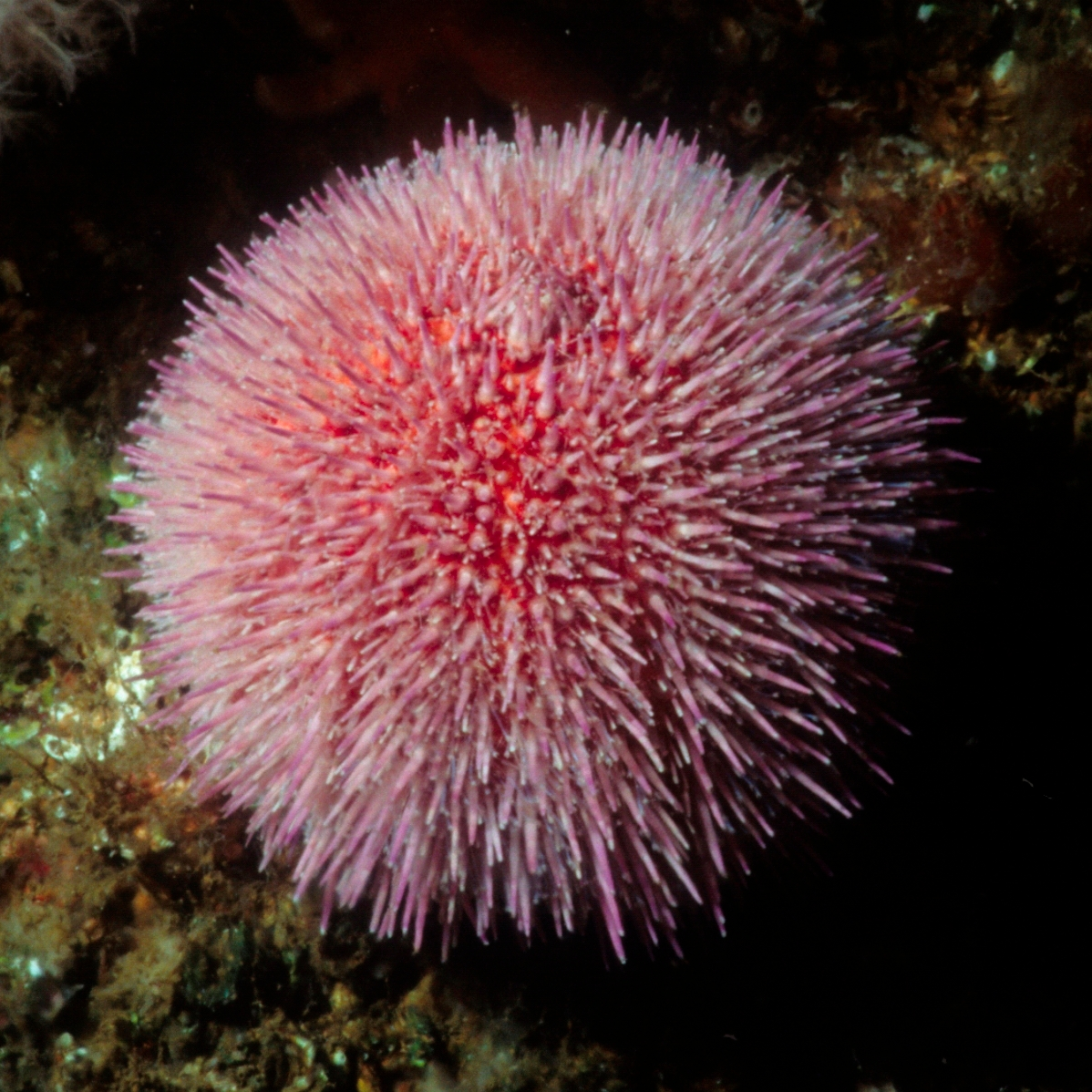
- Echinus esculentus

Scientific classification
- Kingdom: Animalia
- Phylum: Echinodermata
- Class: Echinoidea
- Order: Camarodonta
- Family: Echinidae
- Genus: Echinus; Linnaeus, 1758

Species
- See text

= Echinus (echinoderm) =

Genus of sea urchins

Echinus is a genus of sea urchins. Sea urchins are echinoderms that are typically spherical or flattened with a covering of spine-like structures. Sea urchins tend to be important members of their ecosystems by grazing on other organisms and stabilizing populations. In addition to this, sea urchins play a large role in different economies globally as the urchin themselves and their roe are sold for consumption. The same is true for the species within the genus Echinus.

This genus was first described in 1758 by Linnaeus in the book, "Systema Nature Per Regna Tria Nature, Secundum Classes, Orgines, Genera, Species, cum Characteribus, Differentiis, Synonymis, Locis". In this book, the genus is described as having a submerged body with a rough surface. Additionally, the surface of this genus is characterized by moveable spines which cover the surface of the animals.

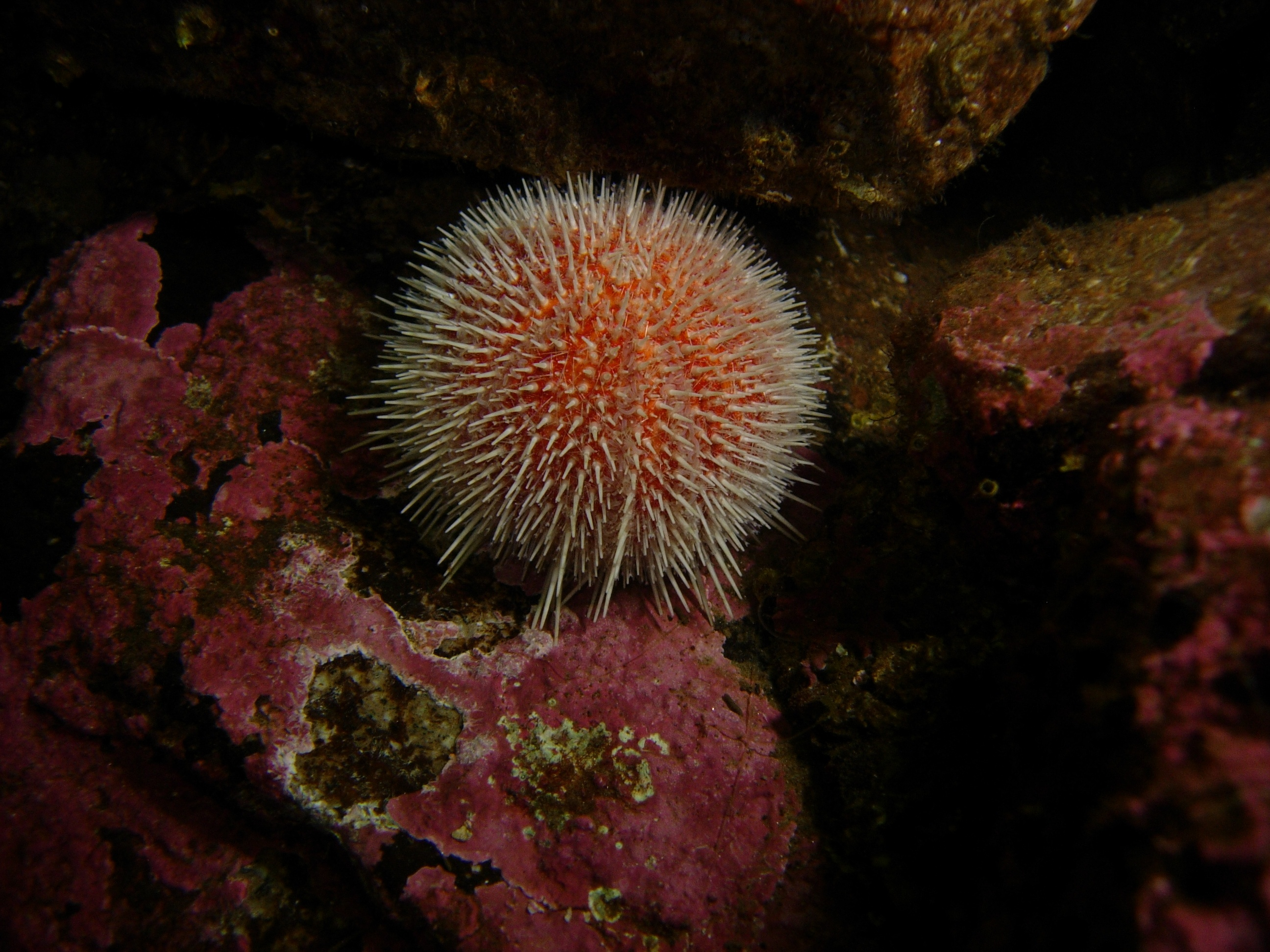
Echinus esculentus (European edible sea urchin)

These organisms can play significant roles in their environment, with species such as Echinus esculentus playing the role of a grazer of organisms growing and living on the surface of substrate in marine environments that tend to be consistently submerged underwater. This species in particular could have been paramount for kelp communities. This is thought to be from the grazing of sea urchins which regulate the lower limit of beds of brown algae, potentially bolstering species diversity.

== Feeding ==
Echinus sea urchins suspension feed by using ciliary band that extends across the body of the pluteus, removing particles from any surface. Those particles then become confined by the pedicellaria of the sea urchin and carried to the mouth, also known as Aristotle's lantern. Many Echnius sea urchins are omnivores, however there are many herbivorous urchins as well. Strongylocentrotus purpuratus, also known as the purple sea urchin, is a herbivorous feeder like some Echinus sea urchins. With that, sea urchins could also be seen as an opportunistic feeder. This means that these creatures that mainly graze on algae could change their normal feeding course of algae to an opportunity nearby, like a dead fish.

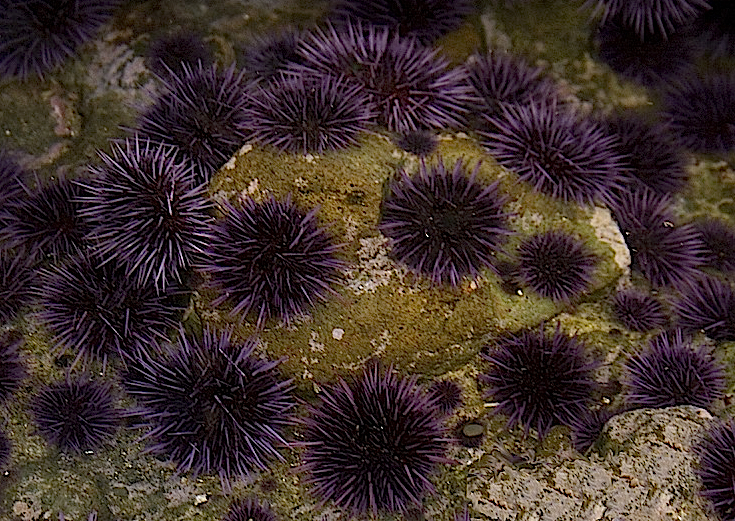
Strongylcocentrotus purpuratus (Purple sea urchin)

== Nervous system ==
Echinus sea urchins have a nervous system like all echinoderms, consisting a nerve rings that surround the pharynx which connect to radial nerves. These nerves branch out into the spines, pedicellaria, and other parts of the urchins body. Echinus sea urchins are very sensitive to touch, any light, and the presence of chemicals, which they can detect in around their pharynx, spines, and pedicellaria. Two types of neurons have been found in the central nervous system of these species from a study of, "Neurobiology of Echinodermata", which contain acetylcholine and dopamine/ noradrenaline. These are transmitters in motor neurons and sensory neurons of the sea urchin.

== Species ==
Species in this genus include:

Image	Scientific name	Distribution
Skeleton of Echinus anchistus	Echinus anchistus Clark, 1912	Pacific
	Echinus esculentus Linnaeus, 1758	North Sea
	Echinus gilchristi Bell, 1904	coast of South Africa
	Echinus melo Mortensen, 1816	the Mediterranean Sea and the eastern Atlantic Ocean between the Azores and the Bay of Biscay
	Echinus tenuispinus Norman, 1868	west of Ireland
	Echinus tylodes Clark, 1912	East Coast of the United States from Cape Cod southwards to the Straits of Florida
	Echinus wallisi A. Agassiz, 1880	Atlantic Coast of the United States

== Age ==
Though it was previously believed that Echinus sea urchins could live anywhere from ages 11 to 28 (Echinus acutus and Echinus affinis respectively), this is no longer considered accurate. Previously, the age of a sea urchin was based on the growth of its skeletal ossicles. It was believed that ossicles grew growth lines or growth bands in relation to each year of life, similar how trees grow rings inside their trunk each year. This method, called sclerochronology, was found to be unreliable because development of growth lines can be greatly affected by stress, and is not consistent among different urchin size-classes and ossicle types.

== Development ==
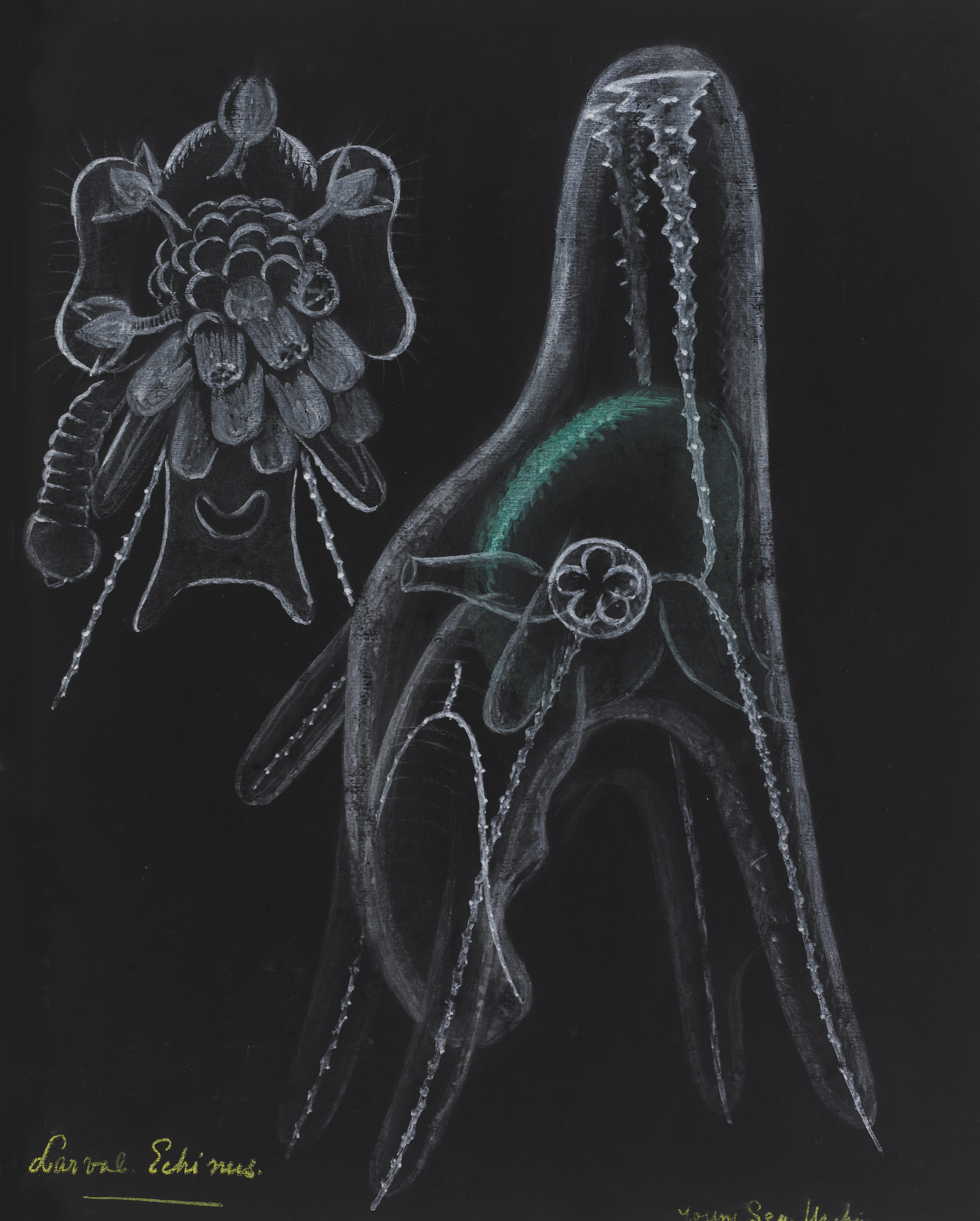
An illustration of a larval form of a sea urchin by Philip Henry Gosse.

Echinus affinus is a deep sea Echinoida and typically live between depths of 1,750 to 2,450 meters. Their development is based on depth and pressure and E.affinus embryos cannot develop in shallow waters at pressures lower than 100atm. Development is ideal at 2,000 meters (2.03 × 10^{7} Pascals). The eggs of this species are small and exhibit the planktotrophic feeding strategy.

=== Fossils ===
- † Echinus coglesi (Cotteau, 1880)
- † Echinus dixoni Forbes, 1852
- † Echinus etheridgei A. Bell, 1898
- † Echinus lamarcki Forbes, 1852
- † Echinus multicostatus Engel, 1941
- † Echinus nodulosus Goldfuss, 1829
- † Echinus paucimiliaris Gregory, 1891
- † Echinus sphaeroides (Nyst, 1868)
- † Echinus woodi Desor, 1855
