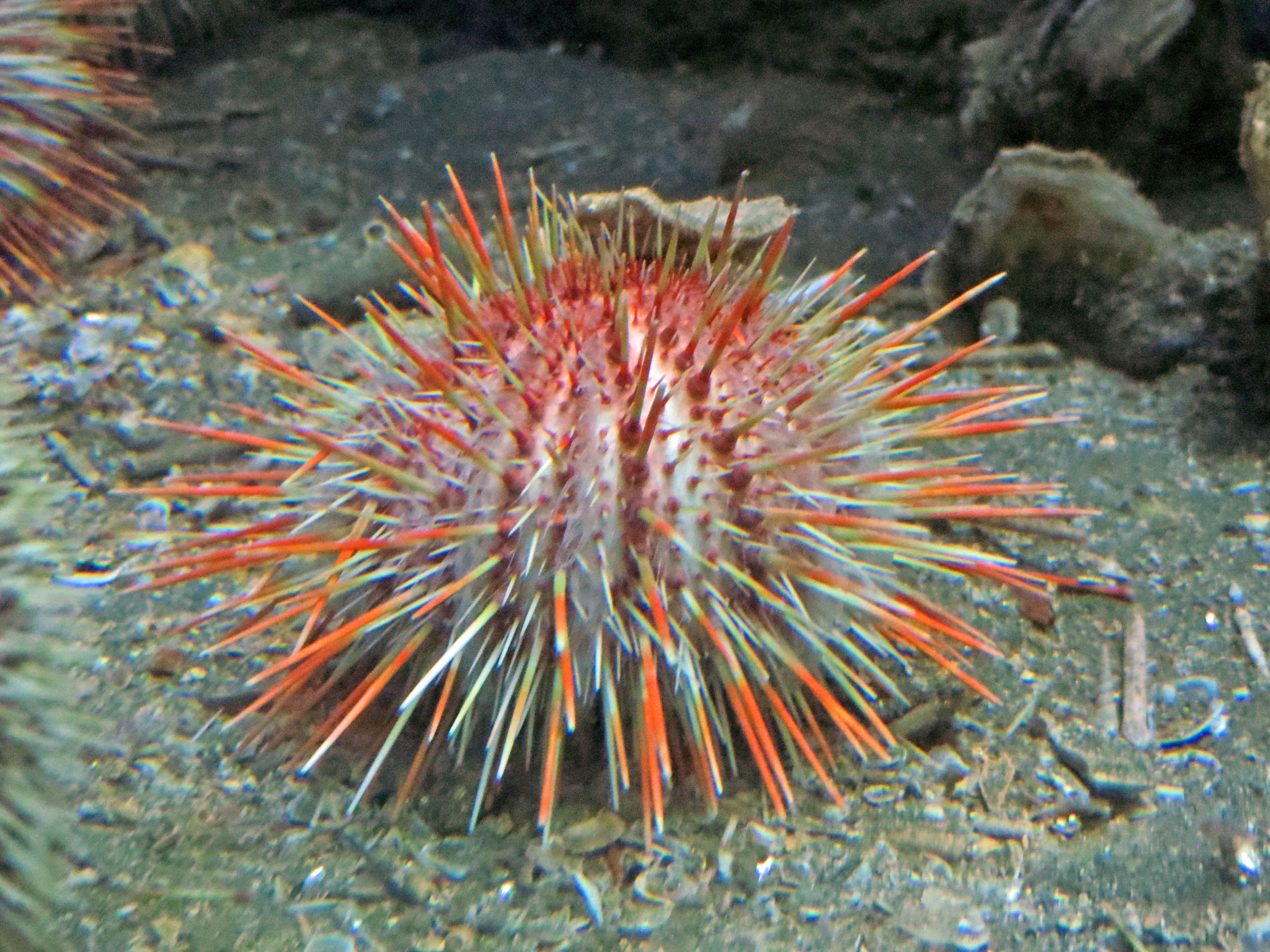
- Gracilechinus acutus at the Biodiversarium of the Observatoire océanologique de Banyuls-sur-Mer

Scientific classification
- Kingdom: Animalia
- Phylum: Echinodermata
- Class: Echinoidea
- Order: Camarodonta
- Family: Echinidae
- Genus: Gracilechinus
- Species: G. acutus

Binomial name
- Gracilechinus acutus Lamarck, 1816

Synonyms
- Echinus acutus Lamarck, 1816

= Gracilechinus acutus =

Species of sea urchin

Gracilechinus acutus is a species of sea urchin in the family Echinidae, commonly known as the white sea urchin. It is an omnivore and feeds on algae and small invertebrates.

== Description ==
Gracilechinus acutus usually grow up to 150 mm in diameter in their adult stage. They appear commonly in a reddish to brown-red color with occasional urchins having a green color. There are vertical white stripes on the ambulacral plates. The Gracilechinus acutus have two types of spines, primary and secondary. Its primary spines are long and tapered while secondary spines are more short and thin. The spines act as a defense mechanism against predators. The area around the mouth does not contain spines, but instead have pedicellariae.

== Distribution ==
Gracilechinus acutus is native to the Atlantic Ocean, the English Channel, the North Sea, and the Mediterranean Sea. They are normally located on coarse substrates such as gravel, sandy, and muddy substrates. They can be found in varying depths from a shallow 20 meters below the surface to greater than 1000 meters.

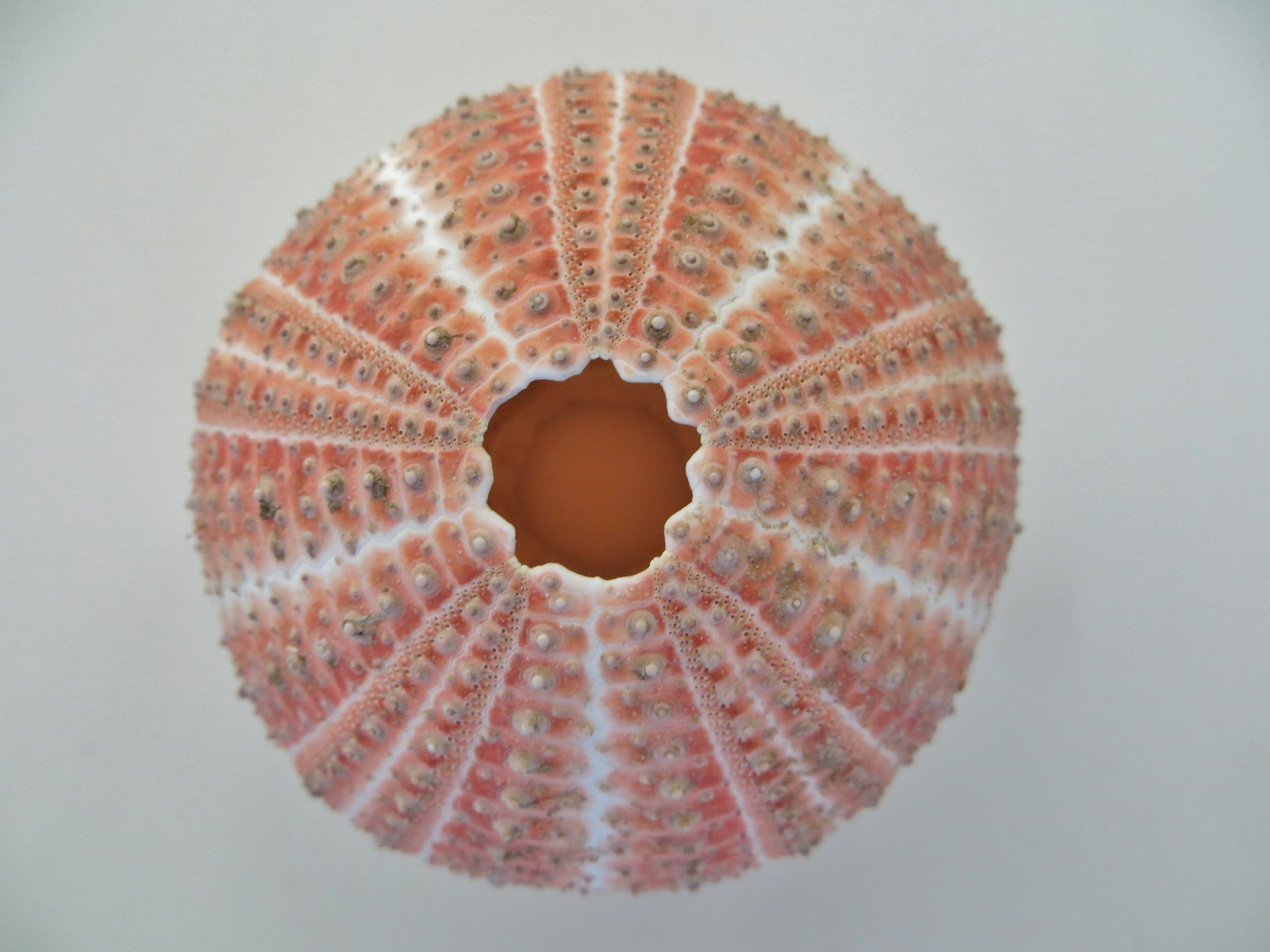
Test of a Gracilechinus acutus

== Biology ==
Gracilechinus acutus are considered very sensitive to disturbance. In a research done by the Spanish National Research Council, bottom trawling had a significant effect on the overall biomass and mean size of Gracilechinus acutus. This showed that bottom trawling is a main source of disturbance in benthic habitats with effects on the ecosystem functional diversity. Gracilechinus acutus was measured against different trawling pressures and it was discovered that they can be used as a bioindicator of trawling impact.
