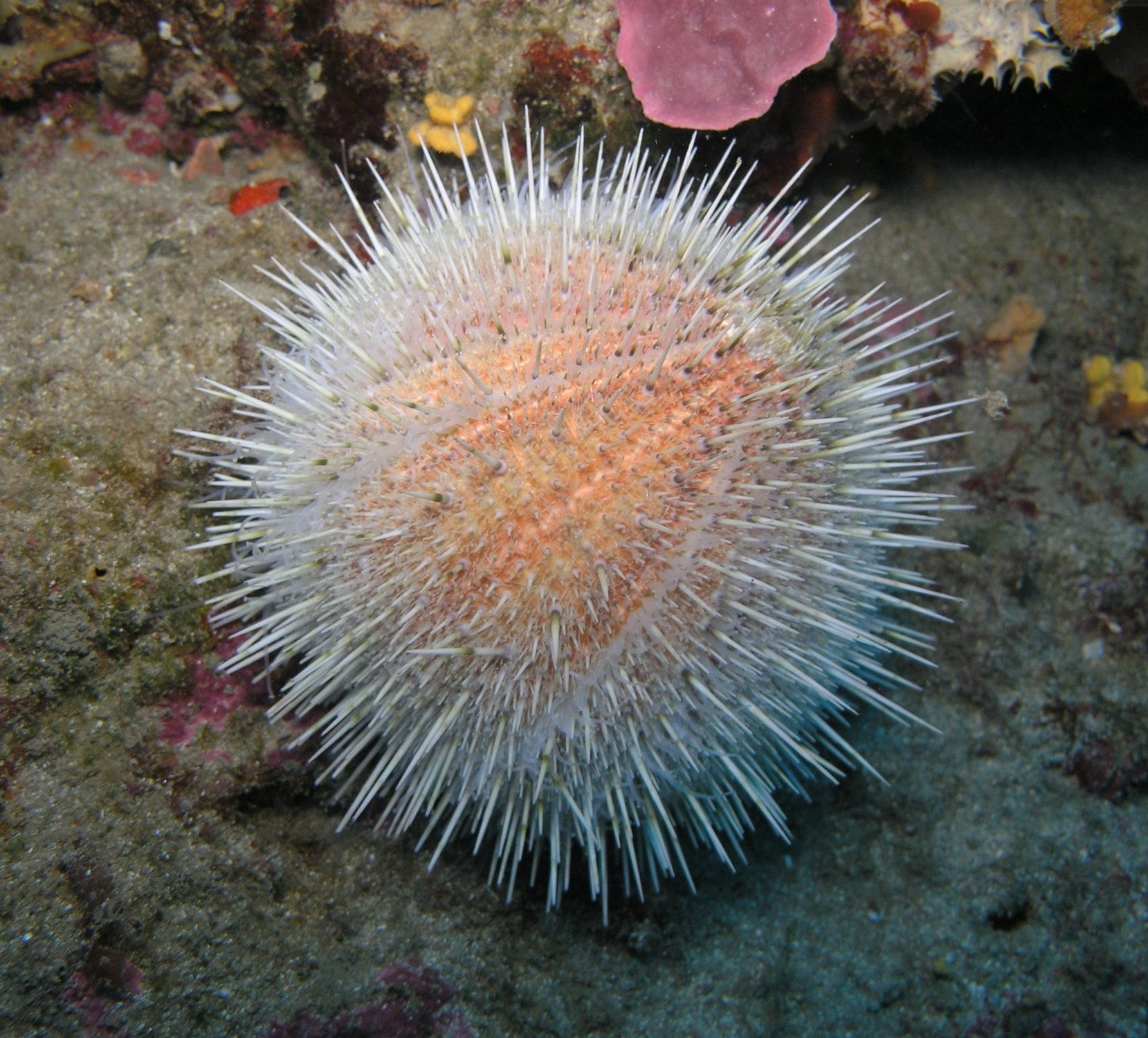
- Echinus melo

Scientific classification
- Kingdom: Animalia
- Phylum: Echinodermata
- Class: Echinoidea
- Order: Camarodonta
- Infraorder: Echinidea
- Family: Echinidae; Gray, 1825

Genera
- See text

= Echinidae =

Echinidae Temporal range: Miocene–Recent

Family of sea urchins

Echinidae is a family of sea urchins in the order Camarodonta. Members of the family are found in the Atlantic Ocean and the Antarctic.

== Characteristics ==
Members of the family Echinidae are characterized by having trigeminate ambulacra (quadrigeminate in one genus) with pairs of tube feet pores arranged either as vertical arcs or as a dense band. The ambulacral plates are compound. The tubercles are imperforate and do not have crenulate edges. There are few tubercles on the interambulacral plates. The buccal notches are reduced in size and, their most significant distinguishing feature, the pedicellariae are globiferous and have one or two pairs of lateral teeth on the narrow tubular blades.

== Genera ==
According to the World Register of Marine Species (WoRMS), the following genera are included in the family:

- Dermechinus (Mortensen, 1942) -- 1 species
- Echinus Linnaeus, 1758 -- 9 species
- Gracilechinus (Fell & Pawson, 1966) -- 8 species
- Polyechinus (Mortensen, 1942) -- 1 species
- Sterechinus (Koehler, 1901) -- 6 species
- Atactus Pomel, 1883 † (nomen dubium)
- Stirechinus (Desor, 1856) †
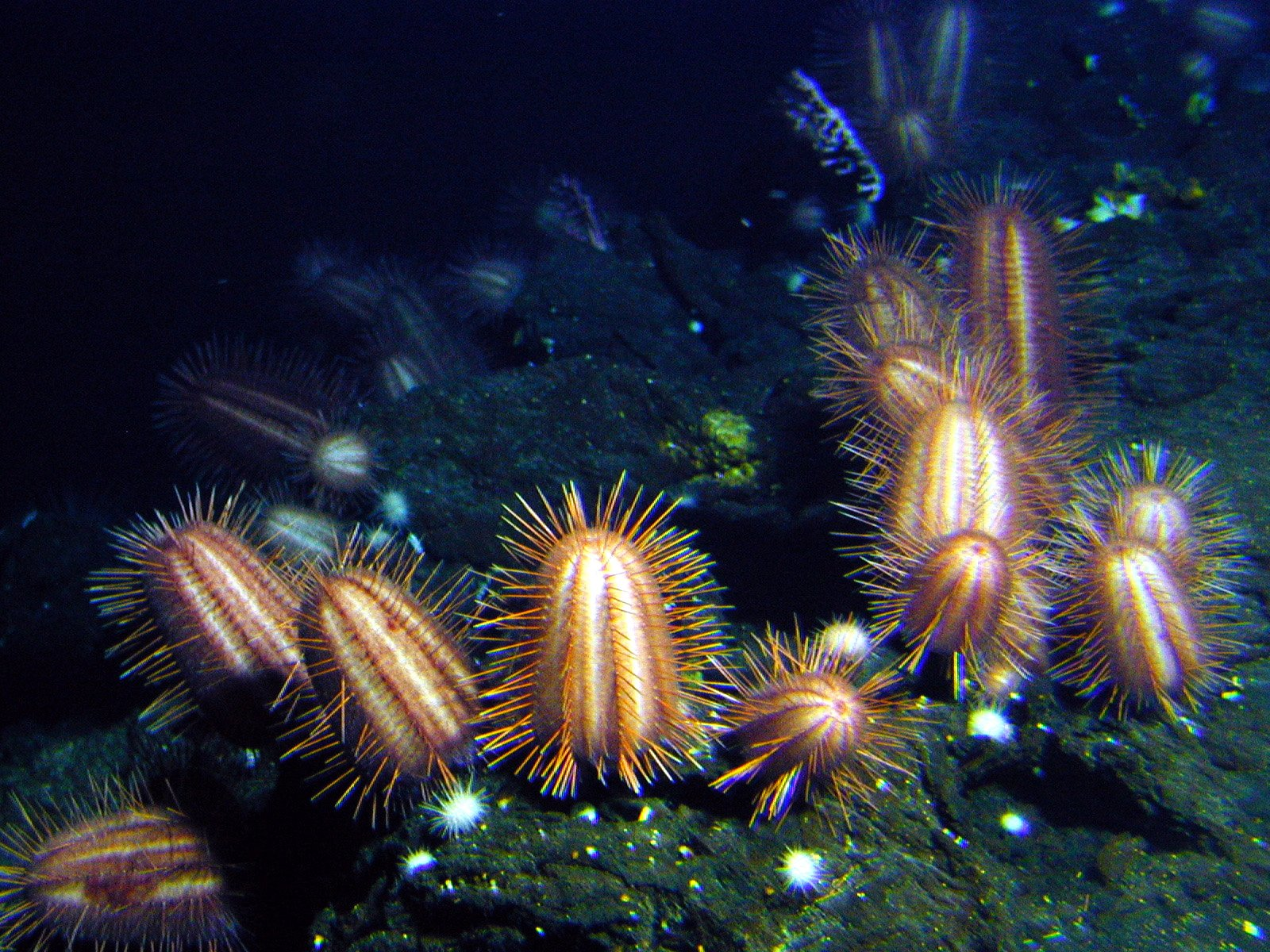
Dermechinus horridus

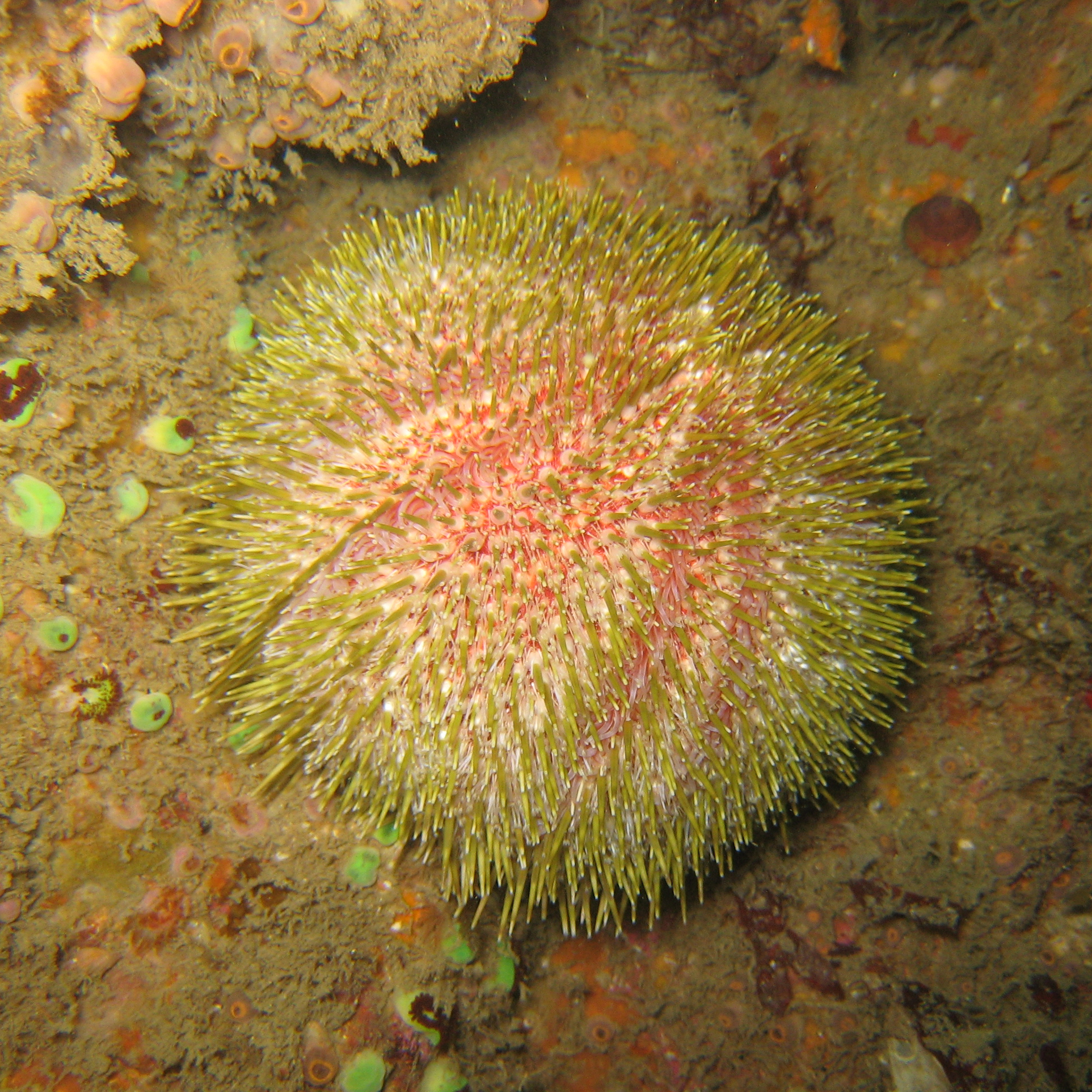
Echinus esculentus

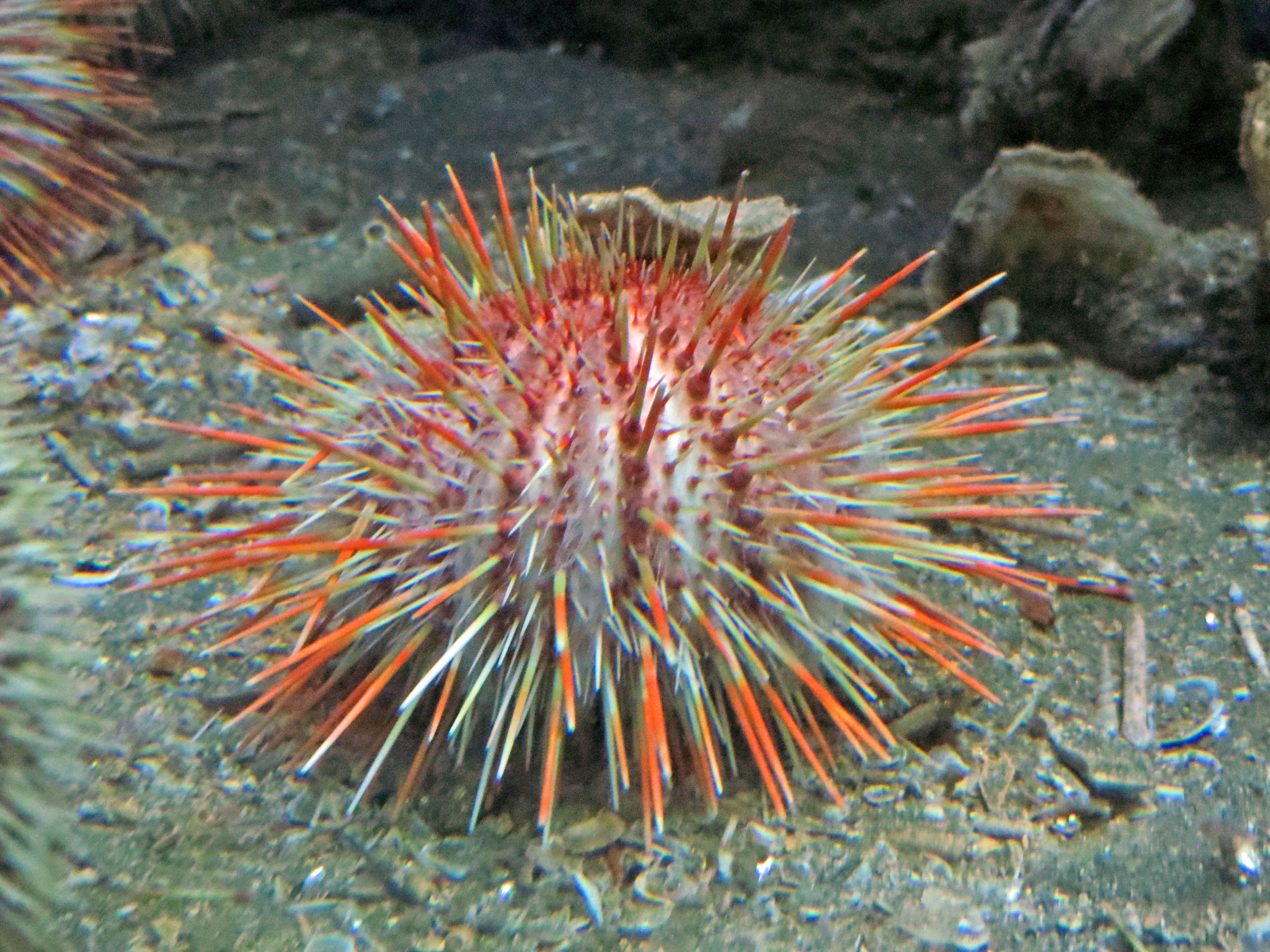
Gracilechinus acutus

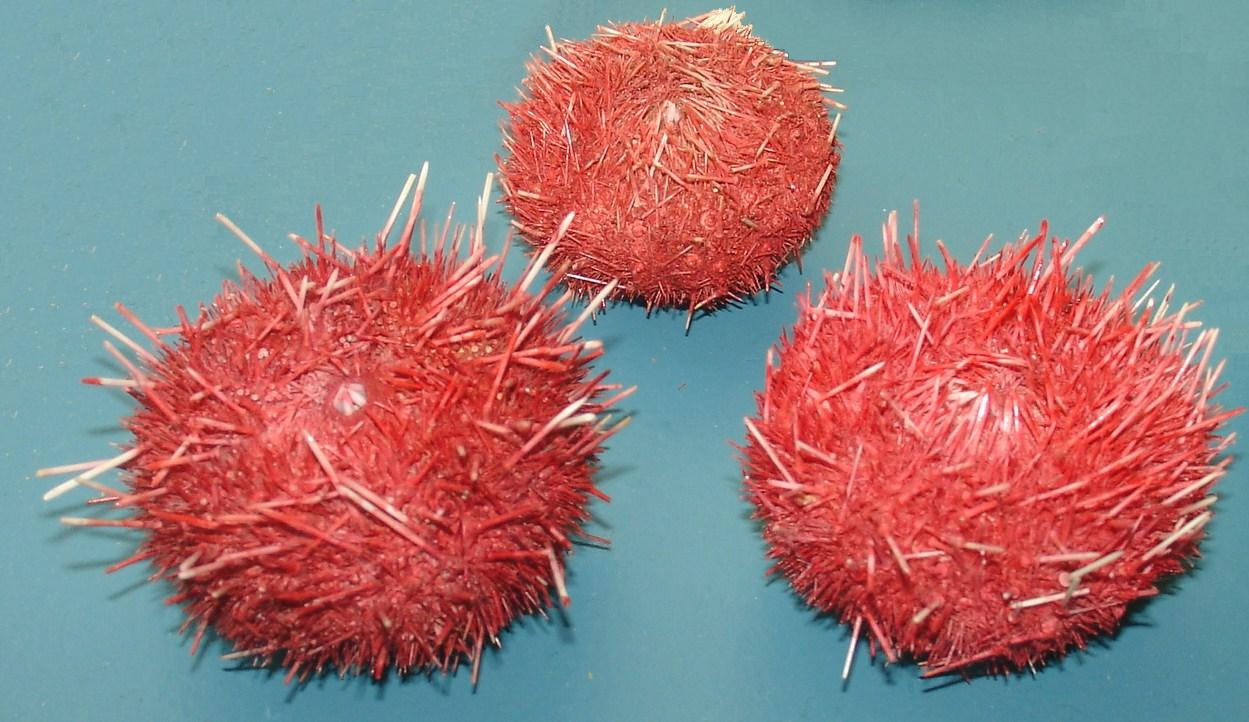
Sterechinus neumayeri
