= Clypeaster annandalei =

Scientific classification
- Kingdom: Animalia
- Phylum: Echinodermata
- Class: Echinoidea
- Order: Clypeasteroida
- Family: Clypeasteridae
- Genus: Clypeaster
- Species: C. annandalei

Binomial name
- Clypeaster annandalei Koehler, 1922

Species of sea urchin

Clypeaster annandalei is a species of sea urchins of the family Clypeasteridae. Their armour is covered with spines. Clypeaster annandalei was first scientifically described in 1922 by Koehler.
