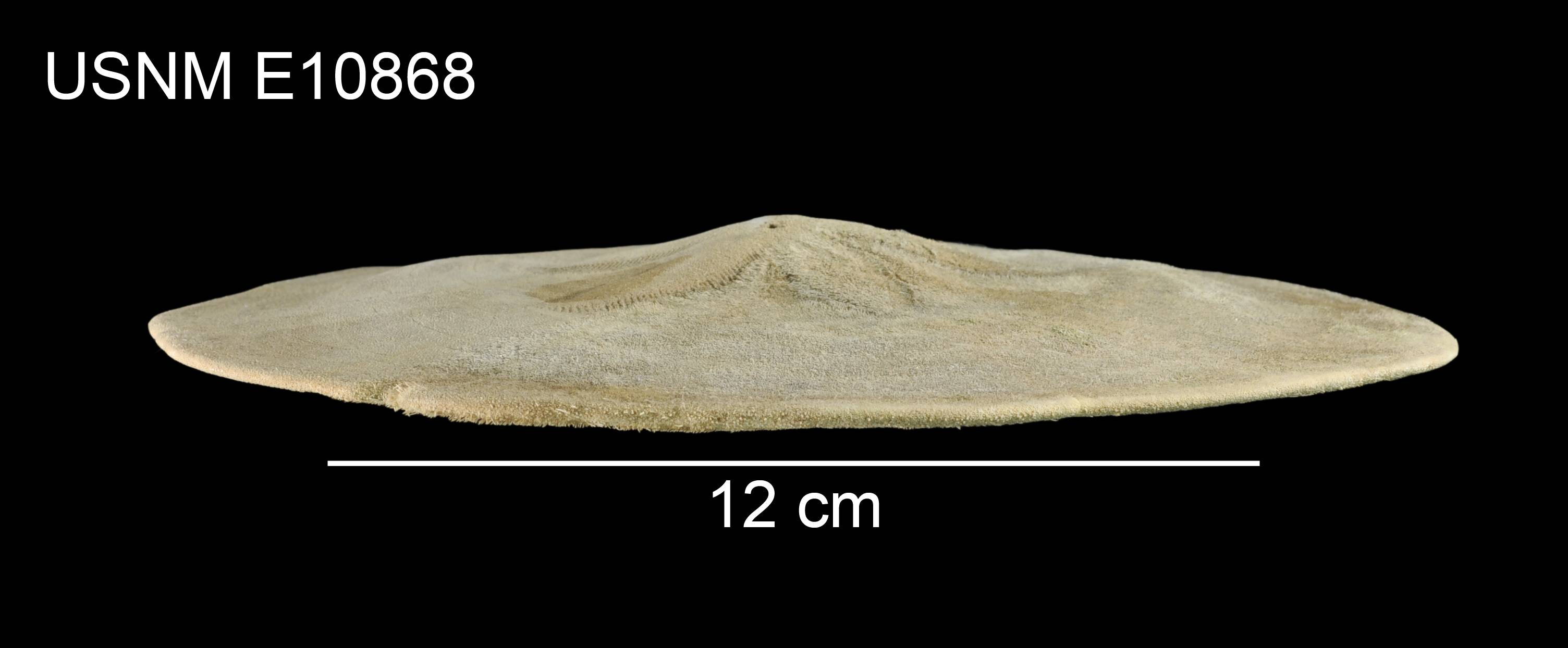

Conservation status
- Apparently Secure (NatureServe)

Scientific classification
- Kingdom: Animalia
- Phylum: Echinodermata
- Class: Echinoidea
- Order: Clypeasteroida
- Family: Clypeasteridae
- Genus: Clypeaster
- Species: C. chesheri

Binomial name
- Clypeaster chesheri Serafy, 1970

= Clypeaster chesheri =

Species of sea urchin

Clypeaster chesheri is a species of sea urchins of the family Clypeasteridae. Their armour is covered with spines. Clypeaster chesheri was first scientifically described in 1970 by Serafy.
