= Clypeaster aloysioi =

Scientific classification
- Kingdom: Animalia
- Phylum: Echinodermata
- Class: Echinoidea
- Order: Clypeasteroida
- Family: Clypeasteridae
- Genus: Clypeaster
- Species: C. aloysioi

Binomial name
- Clypeaster aloysioi (Brito, 1959)

Species of sea urchin

Clypeaster aloysioi is a species of sea urchins of the family Clypeasteridae. Their armour is covered with spines. C. aloysioi was first scientifically described in 1959 by Brito.
