= Clypeaster durandi =

Scientific classification
- Kingdom: Animalia
- Phylum: Echinodermata
- Class: Echinoidea
- Order: Clypeasteroida
- Family: Clypeasteridae
- Genus: Clypeaster
- Species: C. durandi

Binomial name
- Clypeaster durandi (Cherbonnier, 1959)

Species of sea urchin

Clypeaster durandi is a species of sea urchins of the Family Clypeasteridae. Their armour is covered with spines. Clypeaster durandi was first scientifically described in 1959 by Cherbonnier.
