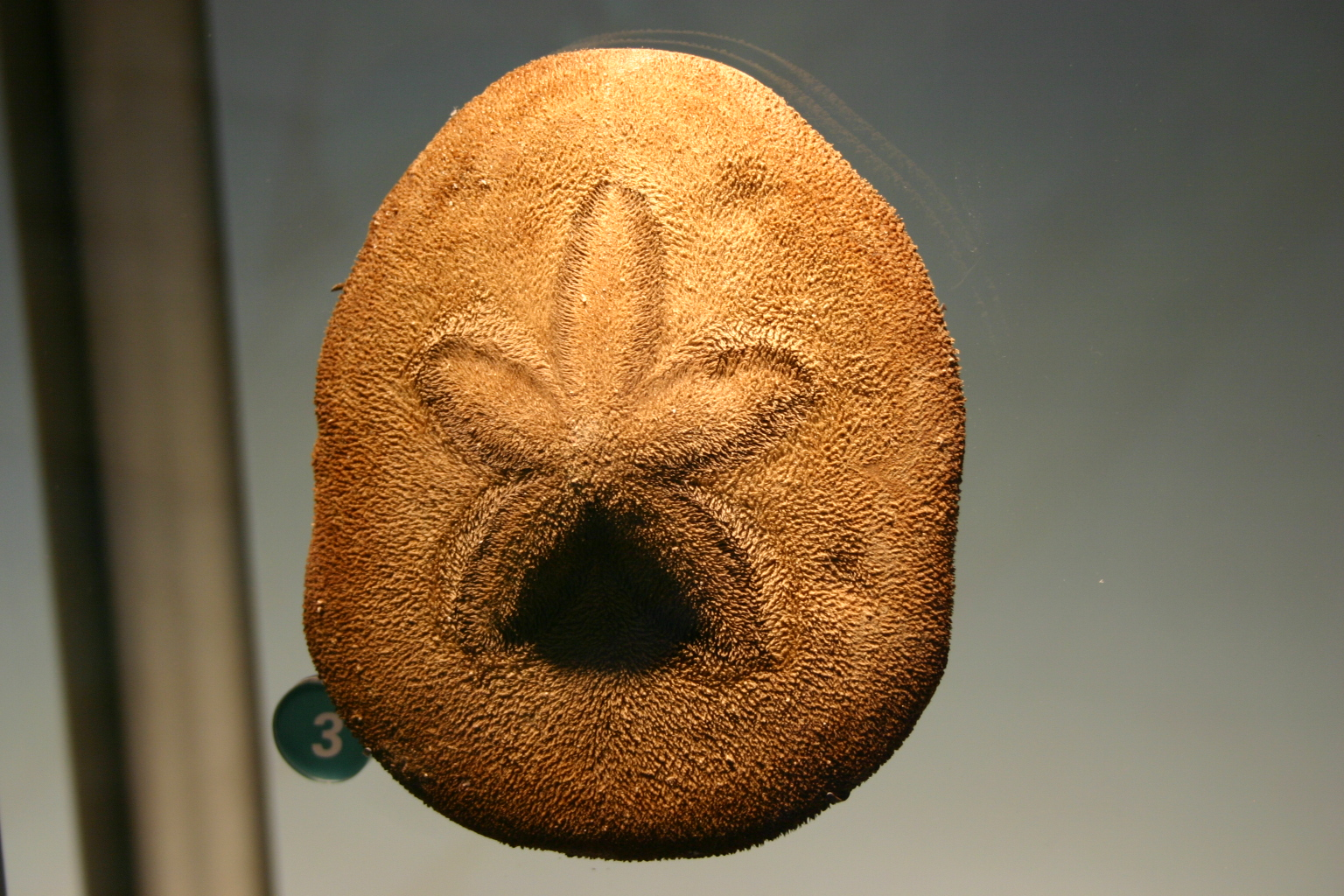

Conservation status
- Apparently Secure (NatureServe)

Scientific classification
- Kingdom: Animalia
- Phylum: Echinodermata
- Class: Echinoidea
- Order: Clypeasteroida
- Family: Clypeasteridae
- Genus: Clypeaster
- Species: C. subdepressus

Binomial name
- Clypeaster subdepressus (Gray, 1825)

Synonyms
- Echinanthus subdepressus Gray, 1825; Stolonoclypus subdepressus (Gray, 1825)

= Clypeaster subdepressus =

Species of sea urchin

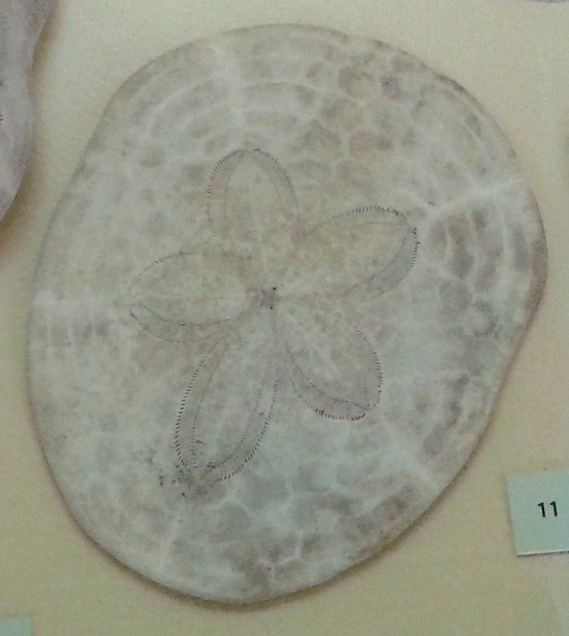
Specimen preserved in the National Museum of Brazil.

Clypeaster subdepressus is a species of sea urchin in the family Clypeasteridae. This species was first scientifically described in 1825 by the British zoologist John Edward Gray. It is a very large and flattened sea biscuit, native to the east coasts of North, Central and South America.

== Distribution ==
This species is found in shallow water in the tropical and subtropical western Atlantic Ocean. Its range extends from North Carolina southwards to the Caribbean Sea, Central and South America, as far south as Rio de Janeiro in Brazil.
