= Clypeaster elongatus =

Scientific classification
- Kingdom: Animalia
- Phylum: Echinodermata
- Class: Echinoidea
- Order: Clypeasteroida
- Family: Clypeasteridae
- Genus: Clypeaster
- Species: C. elongatus

Binomial name
- Clypeaster elongatus Clark, 1948

Species of sea urchin

Clypeaster elongatus is a species of sea urchins of the family Clypeasteridae. Their armour is covered with spines. Clypeaster elongatus was first scientifically described in 1948 by Hubert Lyman Clark.
