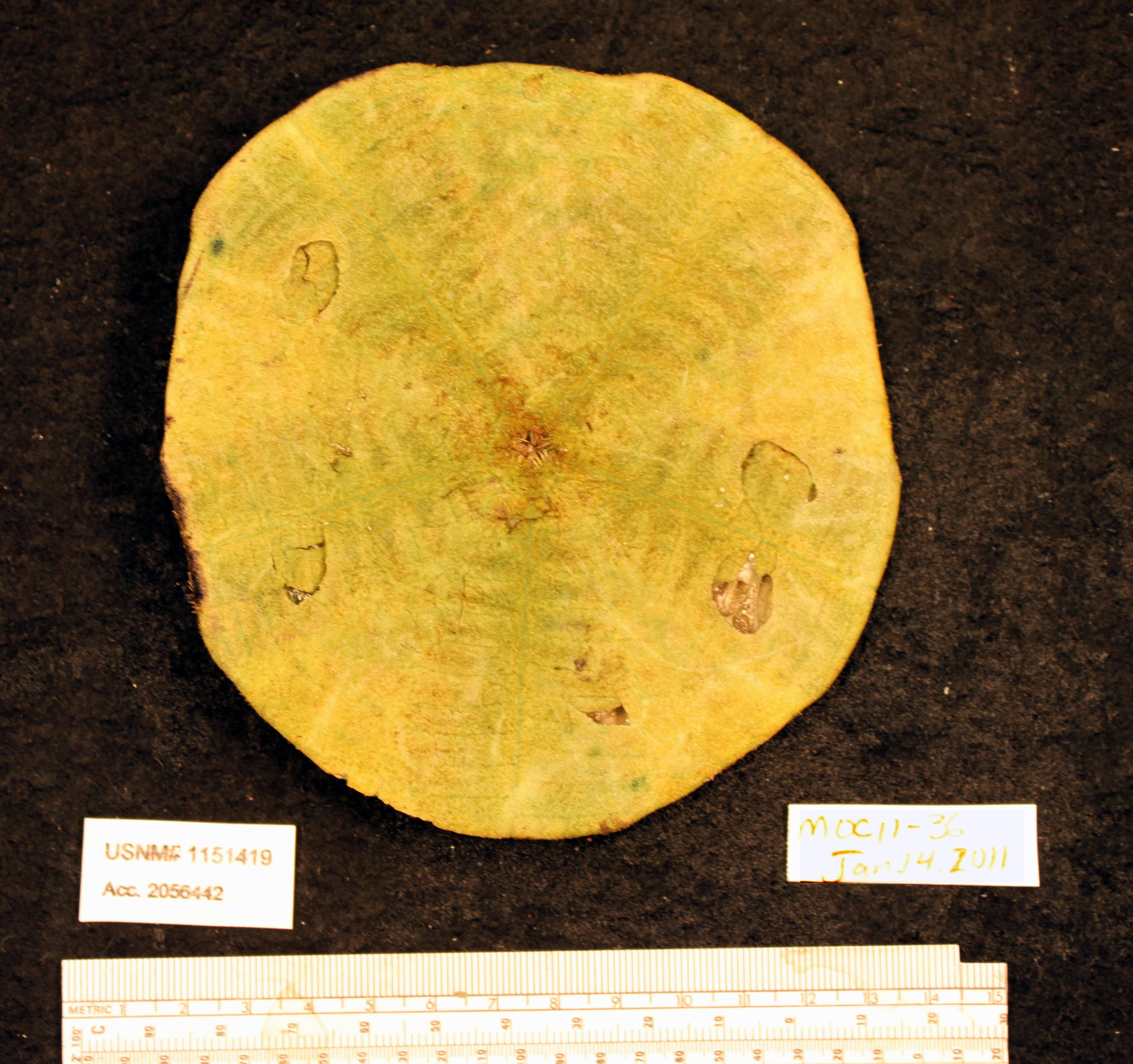

Scientific classification
- Kingdom: Animalia
- Phylum: Echinodermata
- Class: Echinoidea
- Order: Clypeasteroida
- Family: Clypeasteridae
- Genus: Clypeaster
- Species: C. euclastus

Binomial name
- Clypeaster euclastus Clark, 1941

= Clypeaster euclastus =

Species of sea urchin

Clypeaster euclastus is a species of sea urchins of the family Clypeasteridae. Their armour is covered with spines. Clypeaster euclastus was first scientifically described in 1941 by Hubert Lyman Clark.
