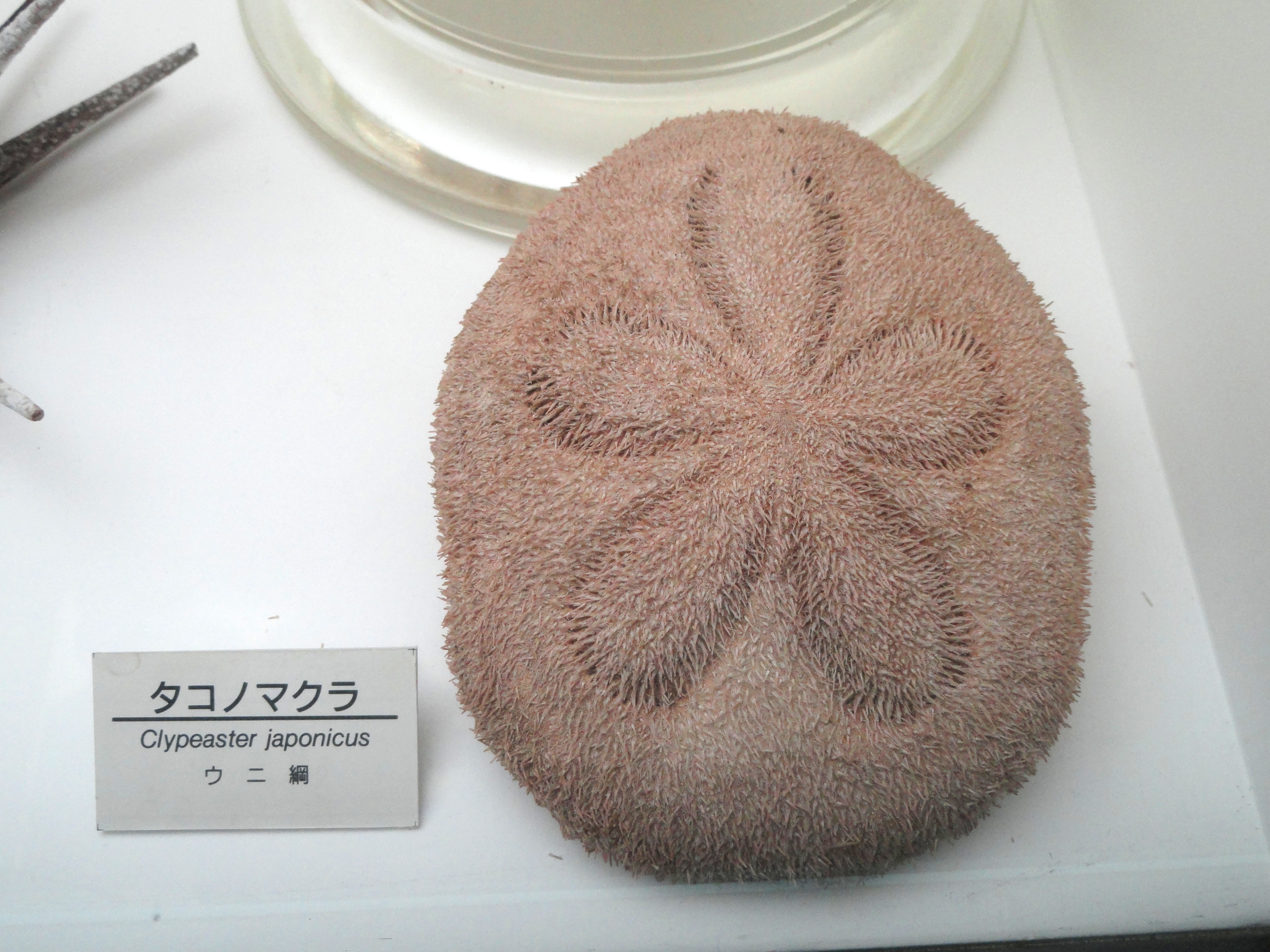

Scientific classification
- Kingdom: Animalia
- Phylum: Echinodermata
- Class: Echinoidea
- Order: Clypeasteroida
- Family: Clypeasteridae
- Genus: Clypeaster
- Species: C. japonicus

Binomial name
- Clypeaster japonicus Döderlein, 1885

Synonyms
- Clypeaster clypeus Döderlein, 1885; Clypeaster excelsior Döderlein, 1885; Plesianthus ogasawaraensis Yoshiwara, 1898)

= Clypeaster japonicus =

Species of sea urchin

Clypeaster japonicus, the Japanese sea biscuit, is a species of sea urchin in the family Clypeasteridae. This species was first scientifically described in 1885 by the German zoologist Ludwig Heinrich Philipp Döderlein.

== Description ==
This is a large species with a strong test, growing to a maximum length of around 120 mm (5 in). In shape it is an elongated pentagon, the aboral (upper) surface slightly higher at the apex than at the margins. The length of the petaloid area amounts to two thirds or more of the total length of the test. The anterior petal is open distally while the two posterior, paired petals are closed distally. The oral (under) surface is fairly flat, but deeply concave around the mouth, with conspicuous, but short, indented food grooves. The anus is on the oral surface near the posterior margin. The primary spines are rather longer than the densely felted secondary spines. When alive, this species is a uniform brown colour apart from the petals, which are a darker brown. The bare test is grey or pale brown.

== Distribution ==
This sea biscuit is endemic to Japanese waters. Its range extends from northern Honshu southwards to southern Kyushu. Its depth range is from 2 to 50 m (7 to 164 ft).
