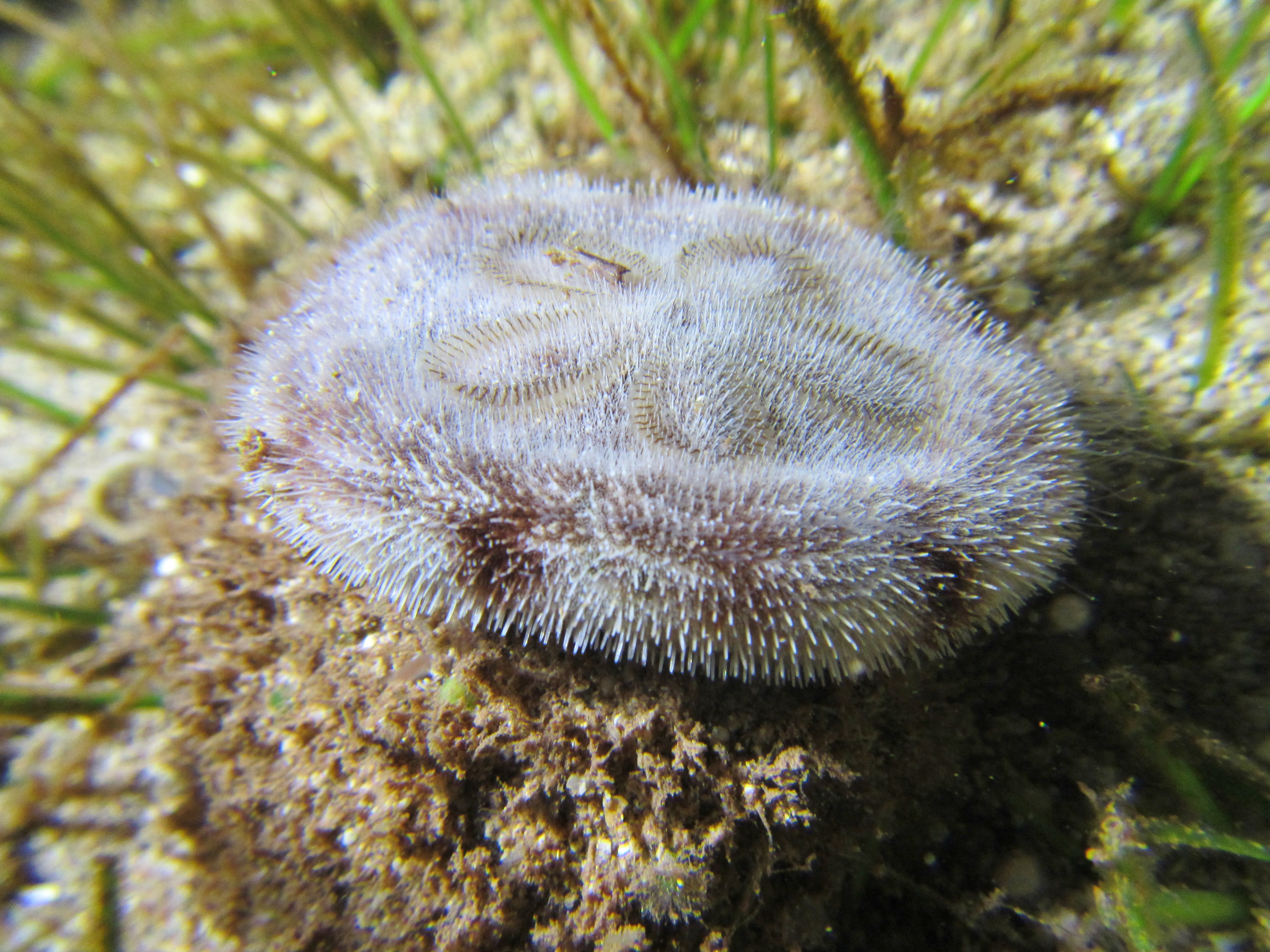
- Live Clypeaster reticulatus

Scientific classification
- Kingdom: Animalia
- Phylum: Echinodermata
- Class: Echinoidea
- Order: Clypeasteroida
- Family: Clypeasteridae
- Genus: Clypeaster; Lamarck, 1801

= Clypeaster =

Clypeaster Temporal range: Late Eocene - Recent

Genus of sea urchins

Clypeaster, common name "cake urchins" or "sea biscuits", is a genus of echinoderms belonging to the family Clypeasteridae.

== Etymology ==
The genus name Clypeaster is derived from the Latin “clypeus” (meaning round shield) and “aster” (meaning star), with reference to the shape of these organisms.

== List of species ==
- Clypeaster aloysioi (Brito, 1959)
- Clypeaster amplificatus Koehler, 1922
- Clypeaster annandalei Koehler, 1922
- Clypeaster australasiae (Gray, 1851)
- Clypeaster chesheri Serafy, 1970
- Clypeaster cyclopilus H.L. Clark, 1941
- Clypeaster durandi (Cherbonnier, 1959b)
- Clypeaster elongatus H.L. Clark, 1948
- Clypeaster euclastus H.L. Clark, 1941
- Clypeaster europacificus H.L. Clark, 1914
- Clypeaster eurychorius H.L. Clark, 1924
- Clypeaster euryptealus H.L. Clark, 1925
- Clypeaster fervens Koehler, 1922
- Clypeaster humilis (Leske, 1778)
- Clypeaster isolatus Serafy, 1971
- Clypeaster japonicus Döderlein, 1885
- Clypeaster kieri Pawson & Phelan, 1979
- Clypeaster lamprus H.L. Clark, 1914
- Clypeaster latissimus (Lamarck, 1816)
- Clypeaster leptostracon A. Agassiz & H.L. Clark, 1907
- Clypeaster luetkeni Mortensen, 1948
- Clypeaster lytopetalus A. Agassiz & H.L. Clark, 1907
- Clypeaster microstomus Lambert, 1912 †
- Clypeaster miniaceus H.L. Clark, 1925
- Clypeaster minihagali Deraniyagala, 1956 †
- Clypeaster nummus Mortensen, 1948
- Clypeaster ochrus H.L. Clark, 1914
- Clypeaster ohshimensis Ikeda, 1935
- Clypeaster oliveirai Krau, 1952
- Clypeaster pallidus H.L. Clark, 1914
- Clypeaster pateriformis Mortensen, 1948
- Clypeaster prostratus (Ravenel, 1845)
- Clypeaster rangianus Desmoulins, 1835
- Clypeaster rarispinus de Meijere, 1903
- Clypeaster ravenelii (A. Agassiz, 1869)
- Clypeaster reticulatus (Linnaeus, 1758)
- Clypeaster rosaceus (Linnaeus, 1758)
- Clypeaster rotundus (A. Agassiz, 1863)
- Clypeaster speciosus Verrill, 1870
- Clypeaster subdepressus (Gray, 1825)
- Clypeaster telurus H.L. Clark, 1914
- Clypeaster tumidus (Tension-Woods, 1878)
- Clypeaster virescens Döderlein, 1885

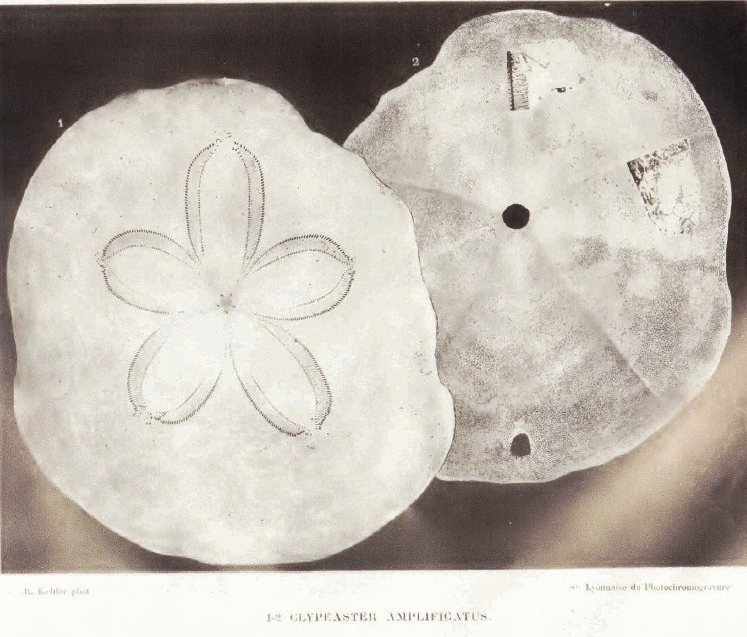
Clypeaster amplificatus

Clypeaster australasiae

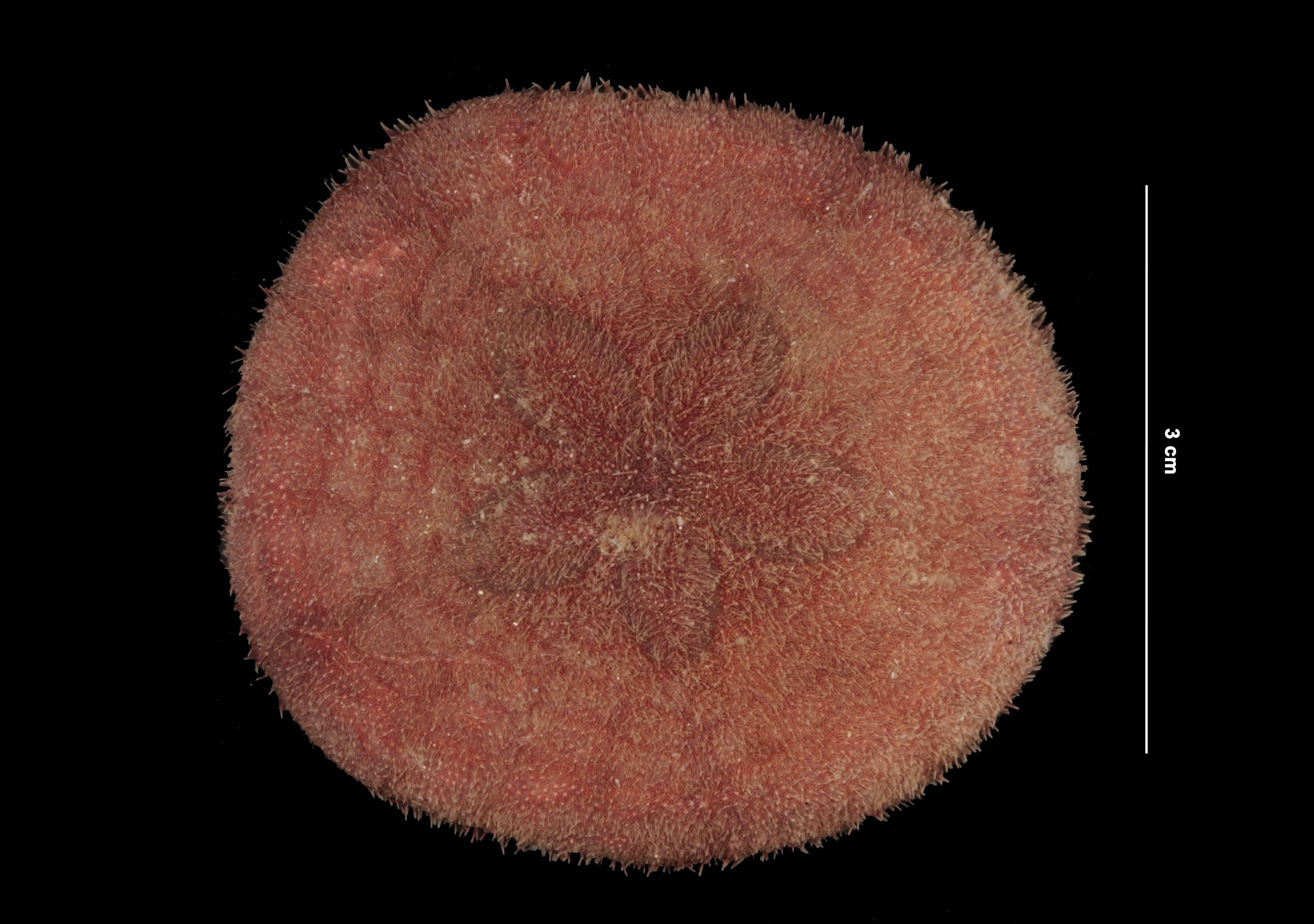
Clypeaster chesheri

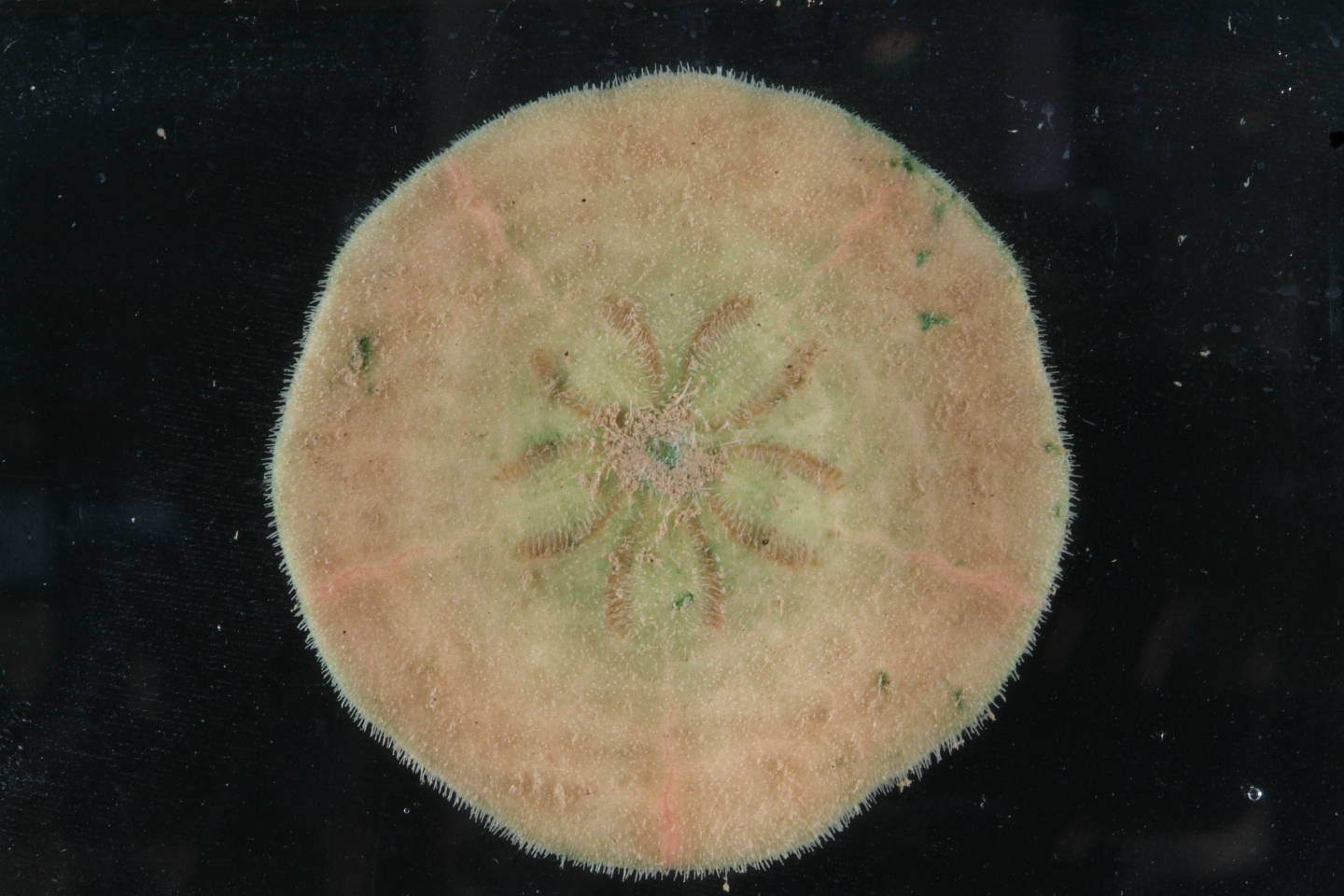
Clypeaster cyclopilus

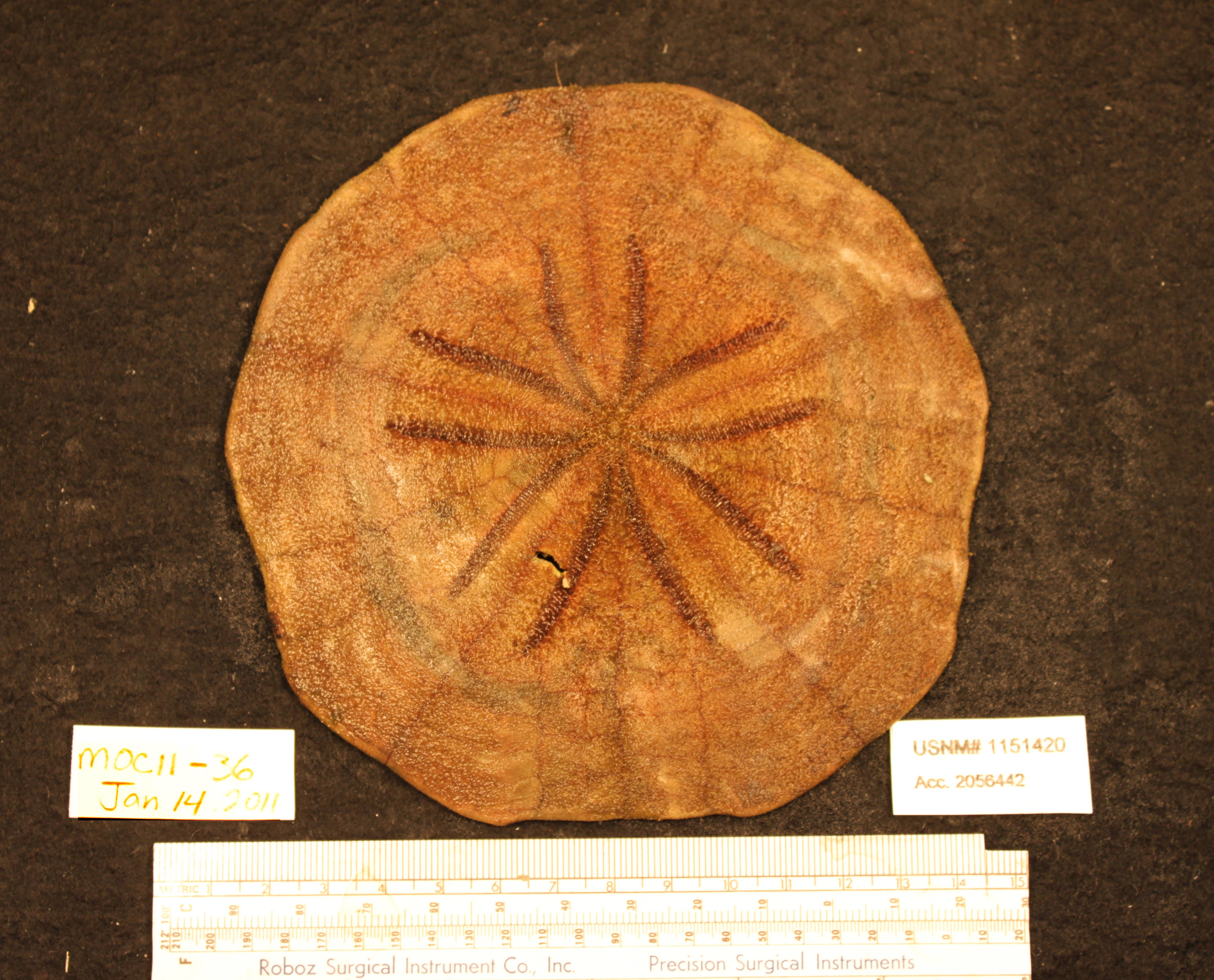
Clypeaster euclastus

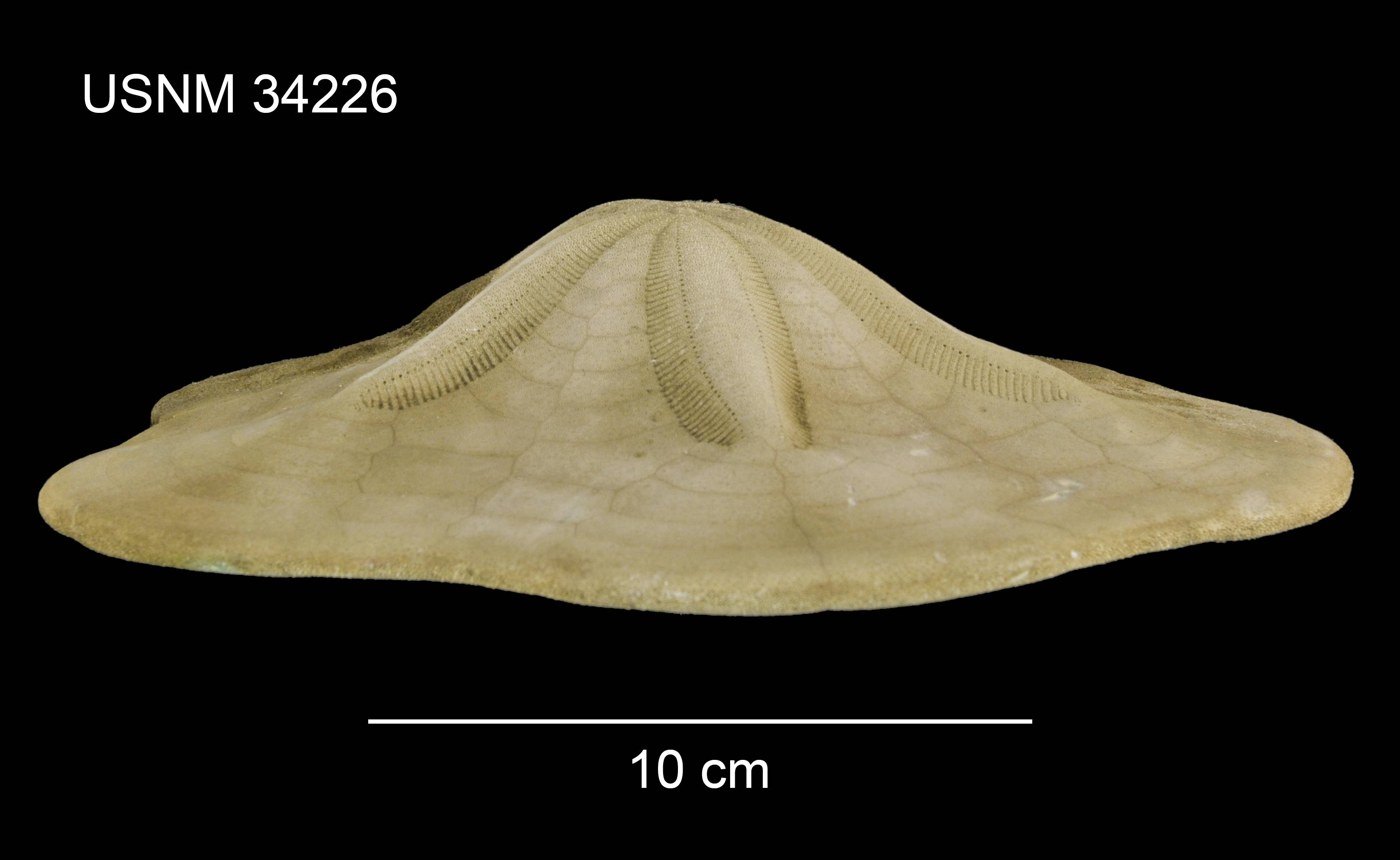
Clypeaster europacificus

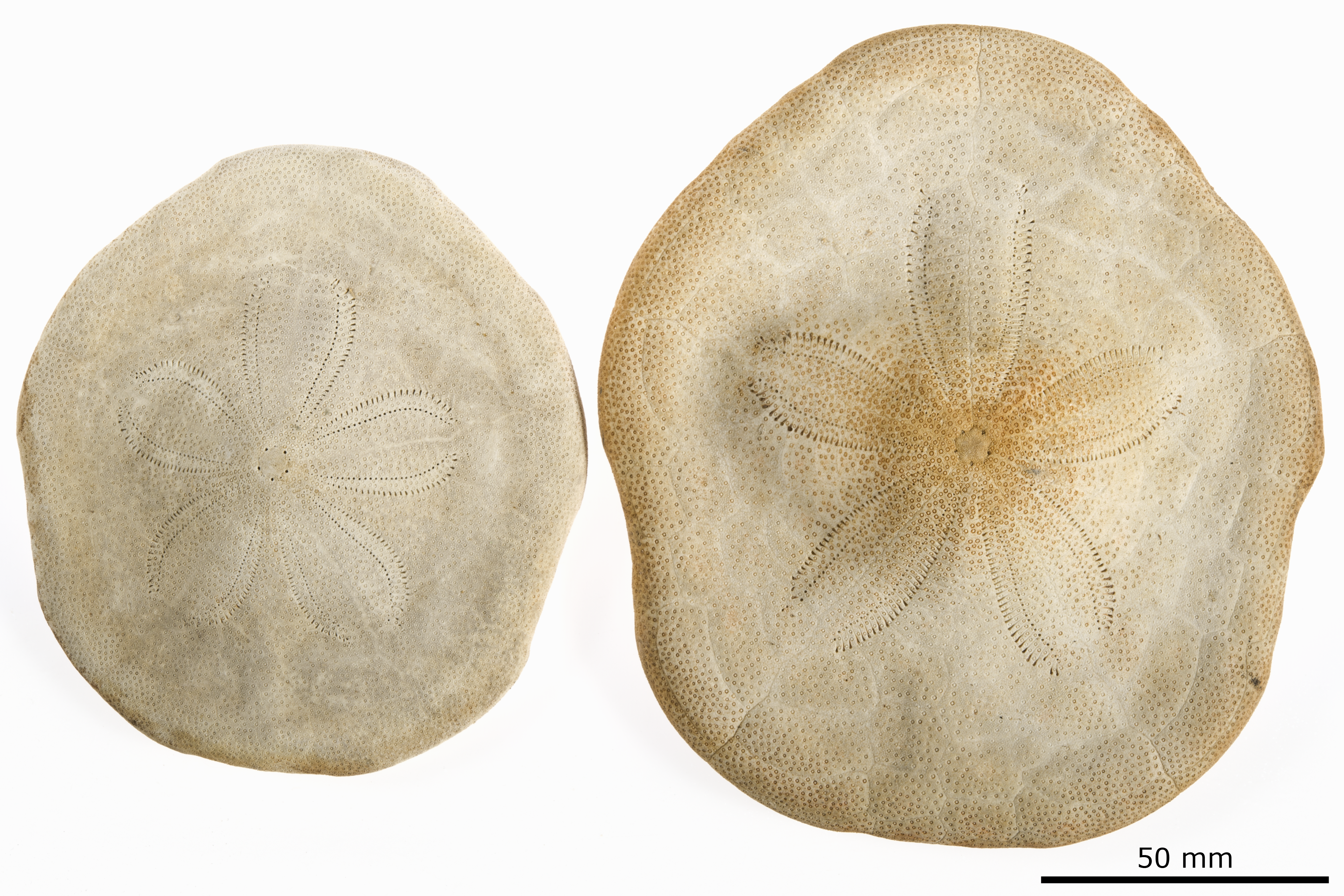
Clypeaster eurychorius

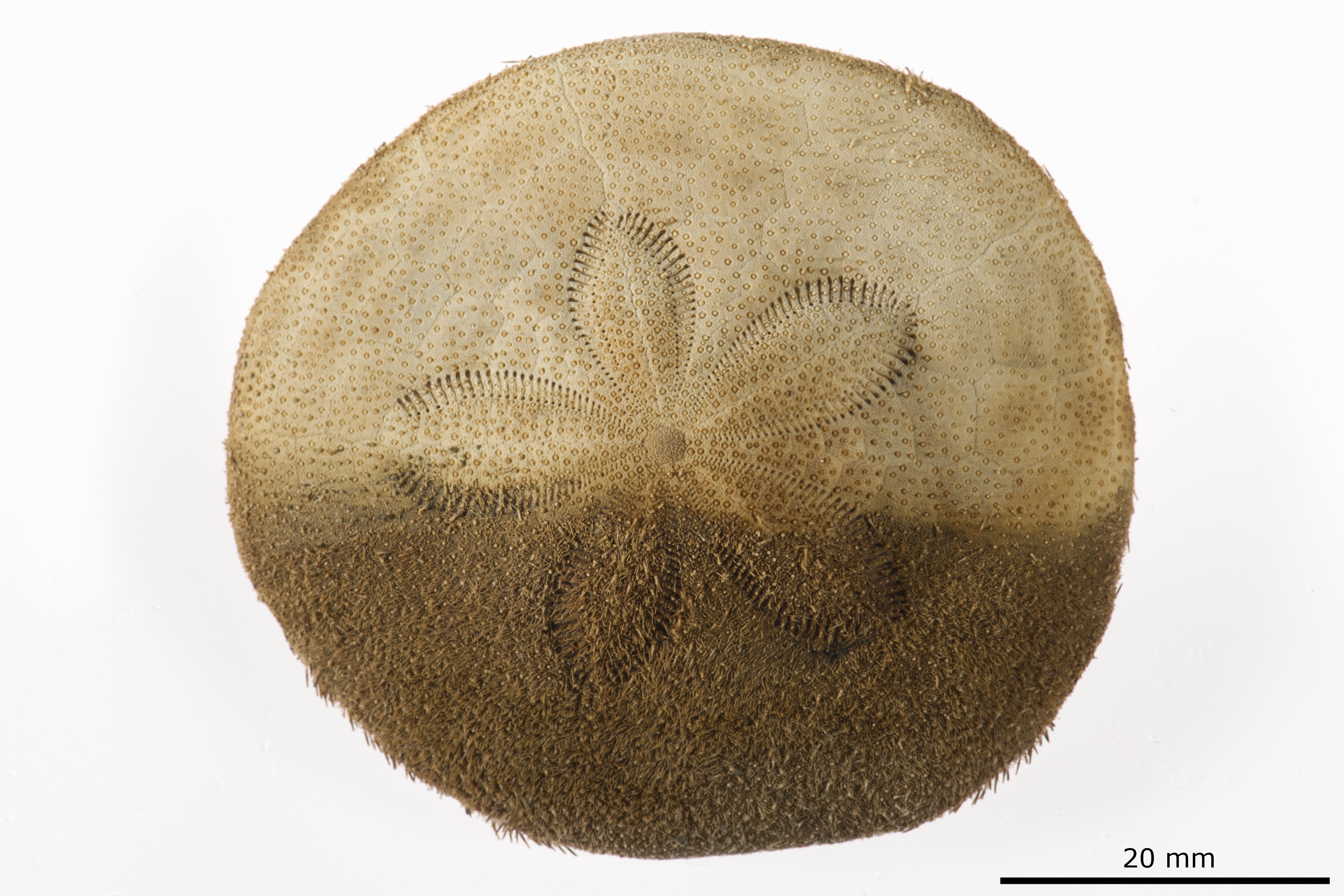
Clypeaster fervens

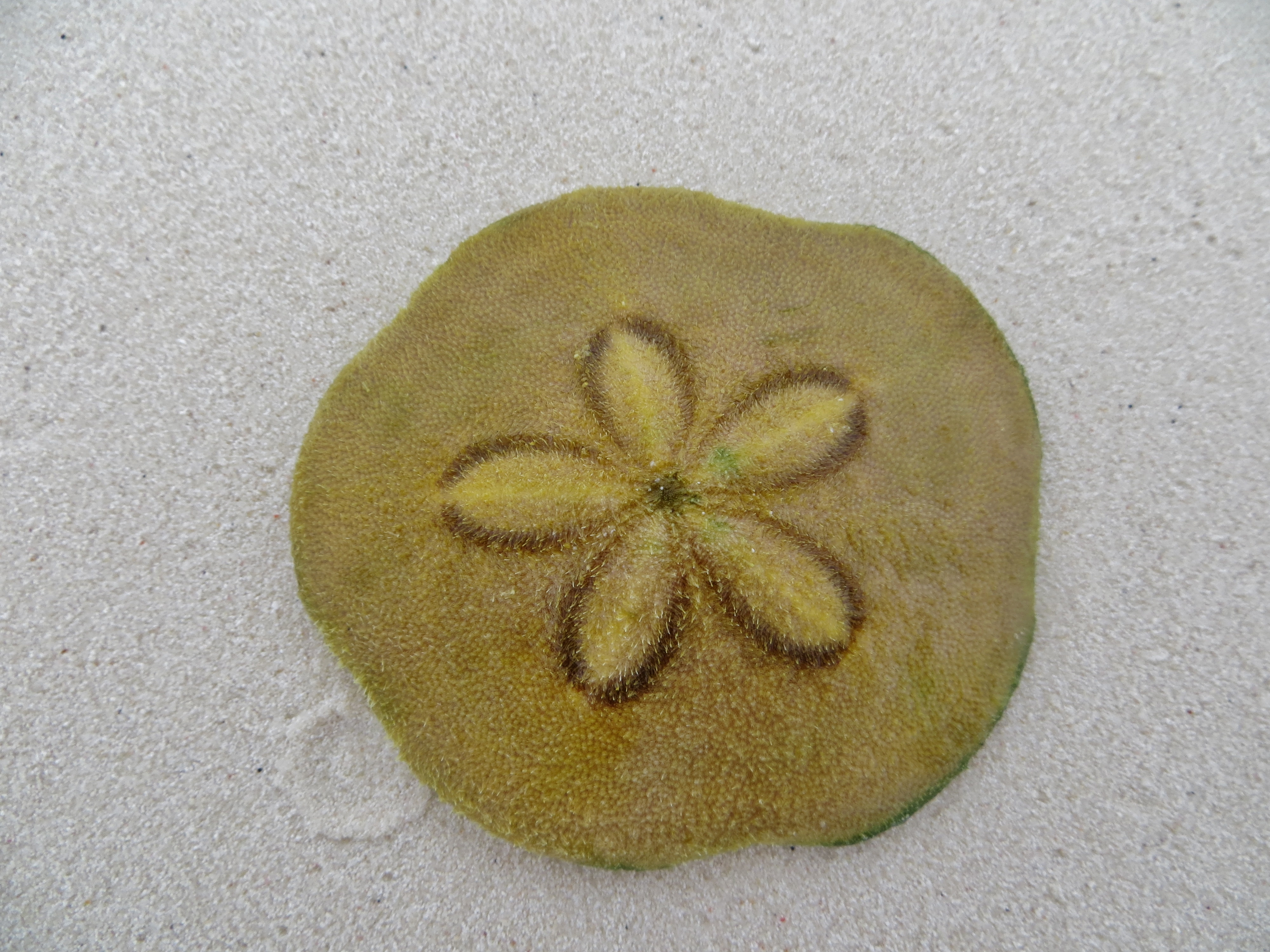
Clypeaster humilis in the Maldives.

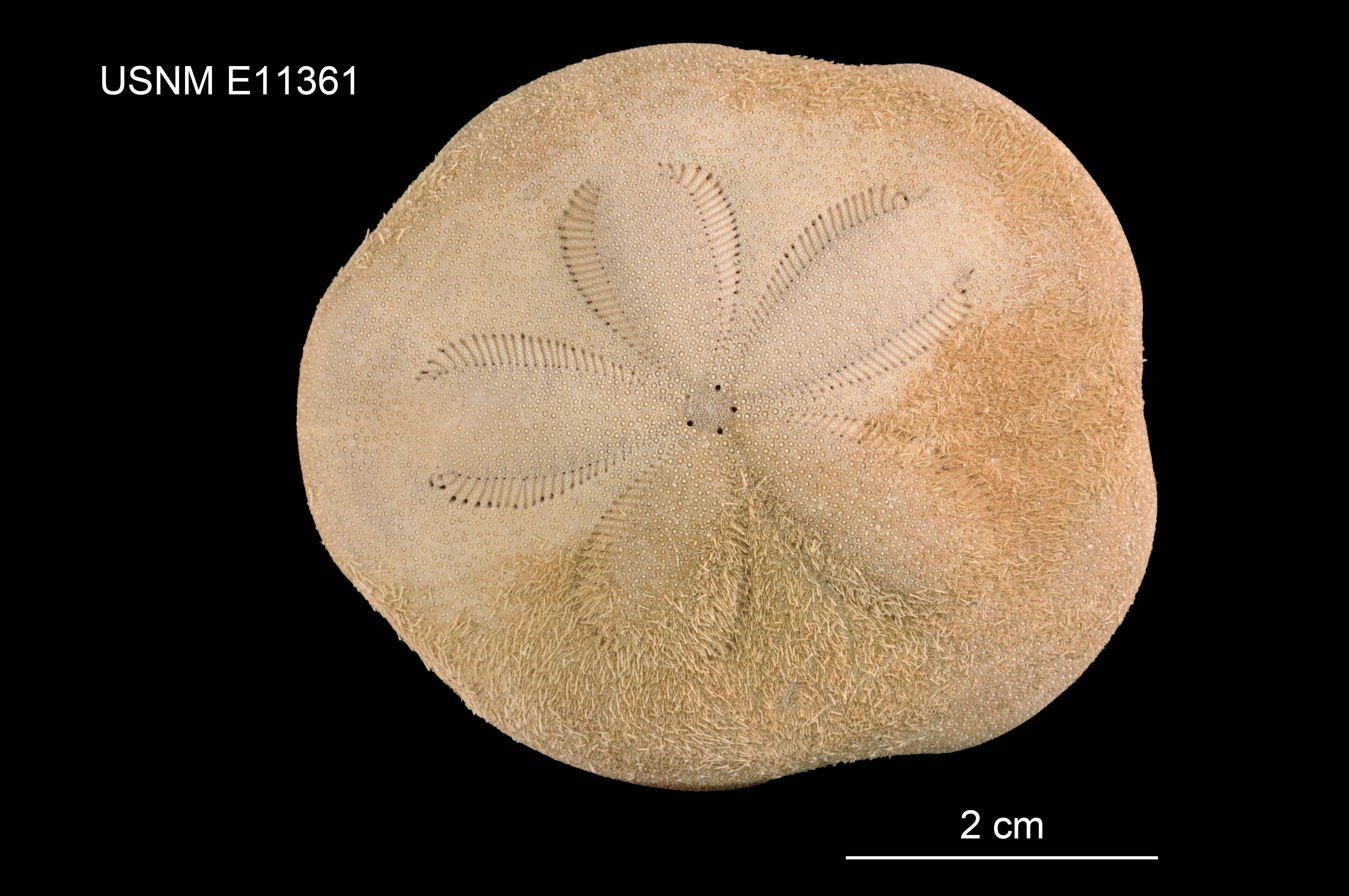
Clypeaster isolatus

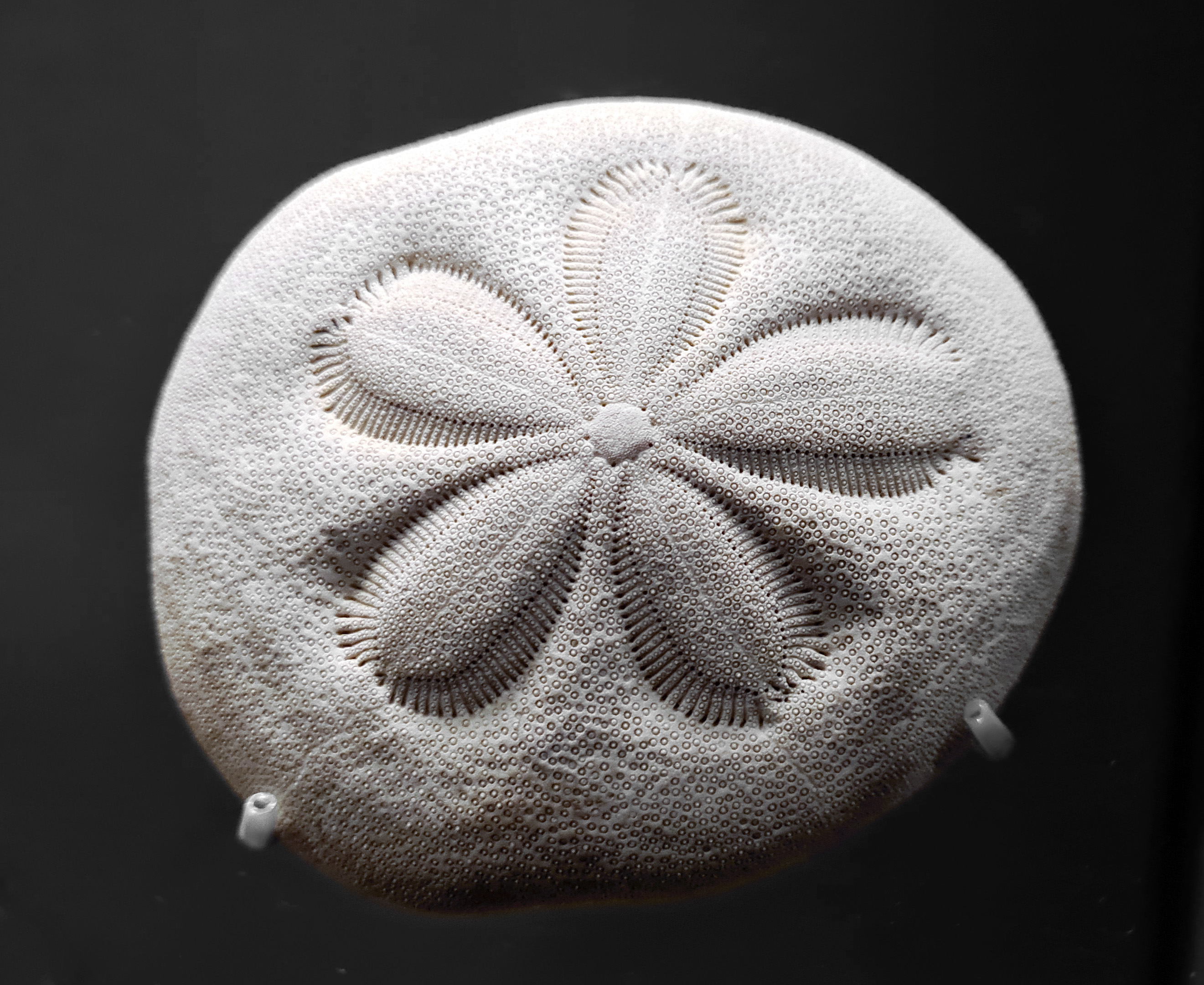
Clypeaster japonicus

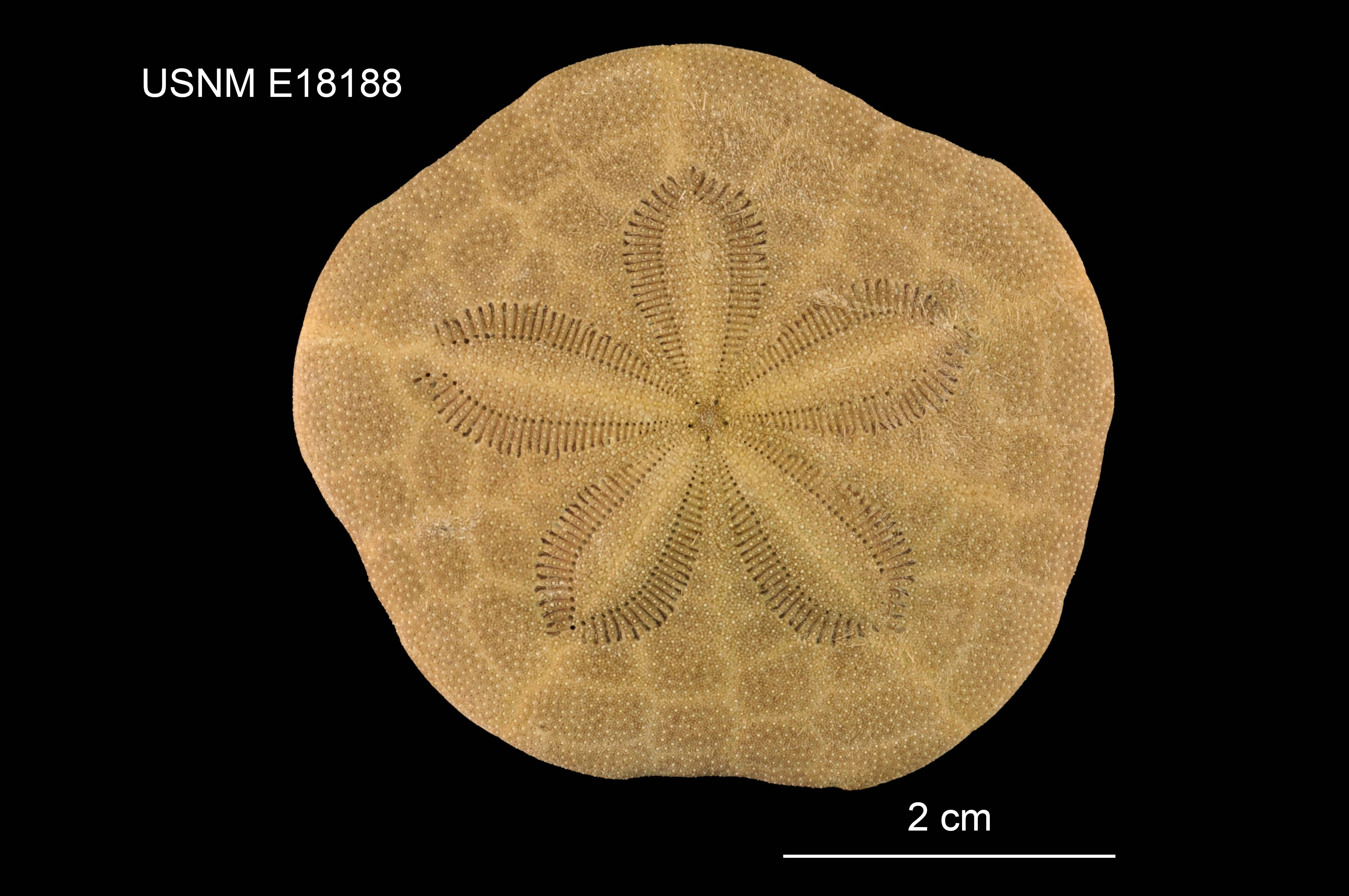
Clypeaster kieri

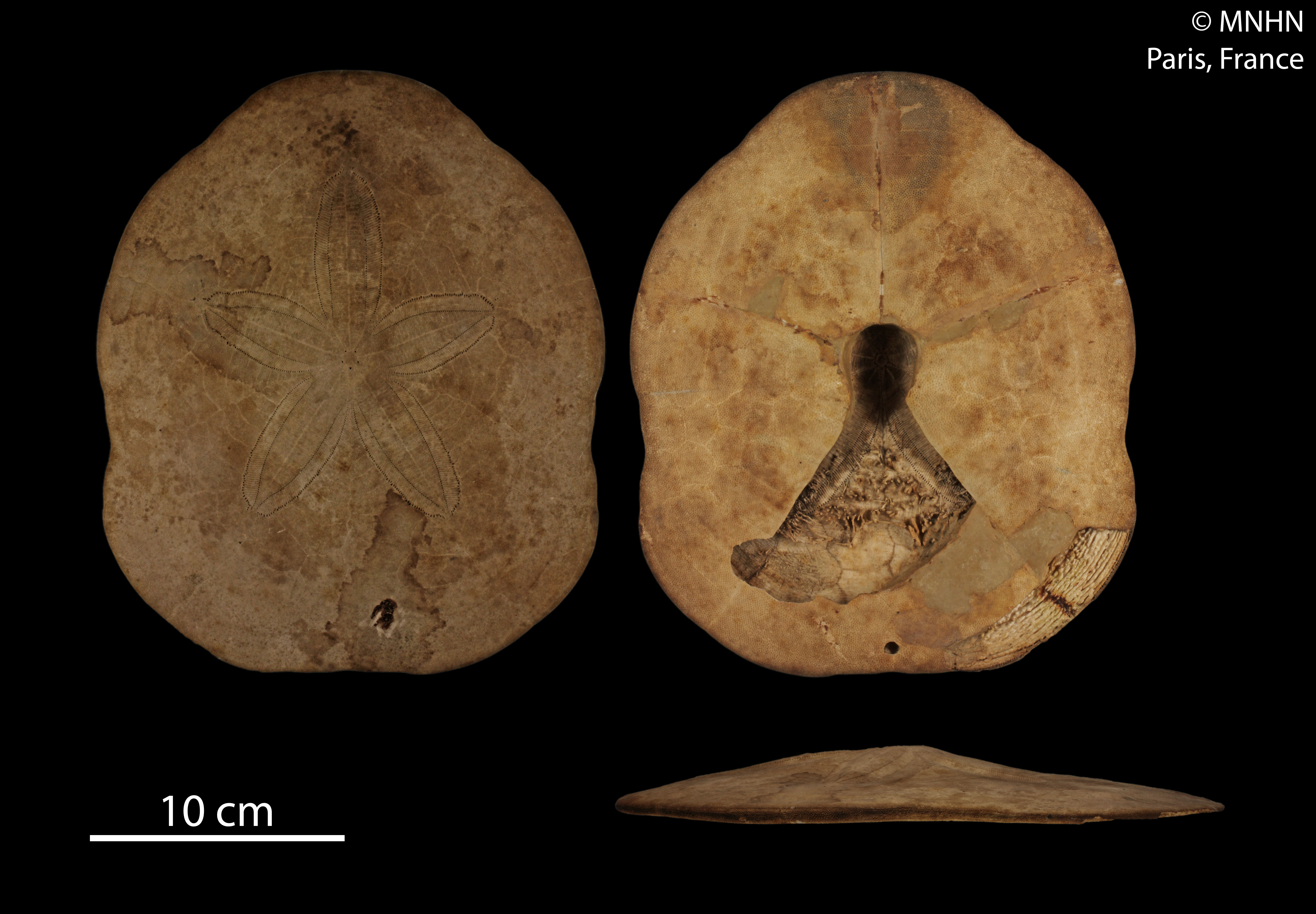
Clypeaster latissimus

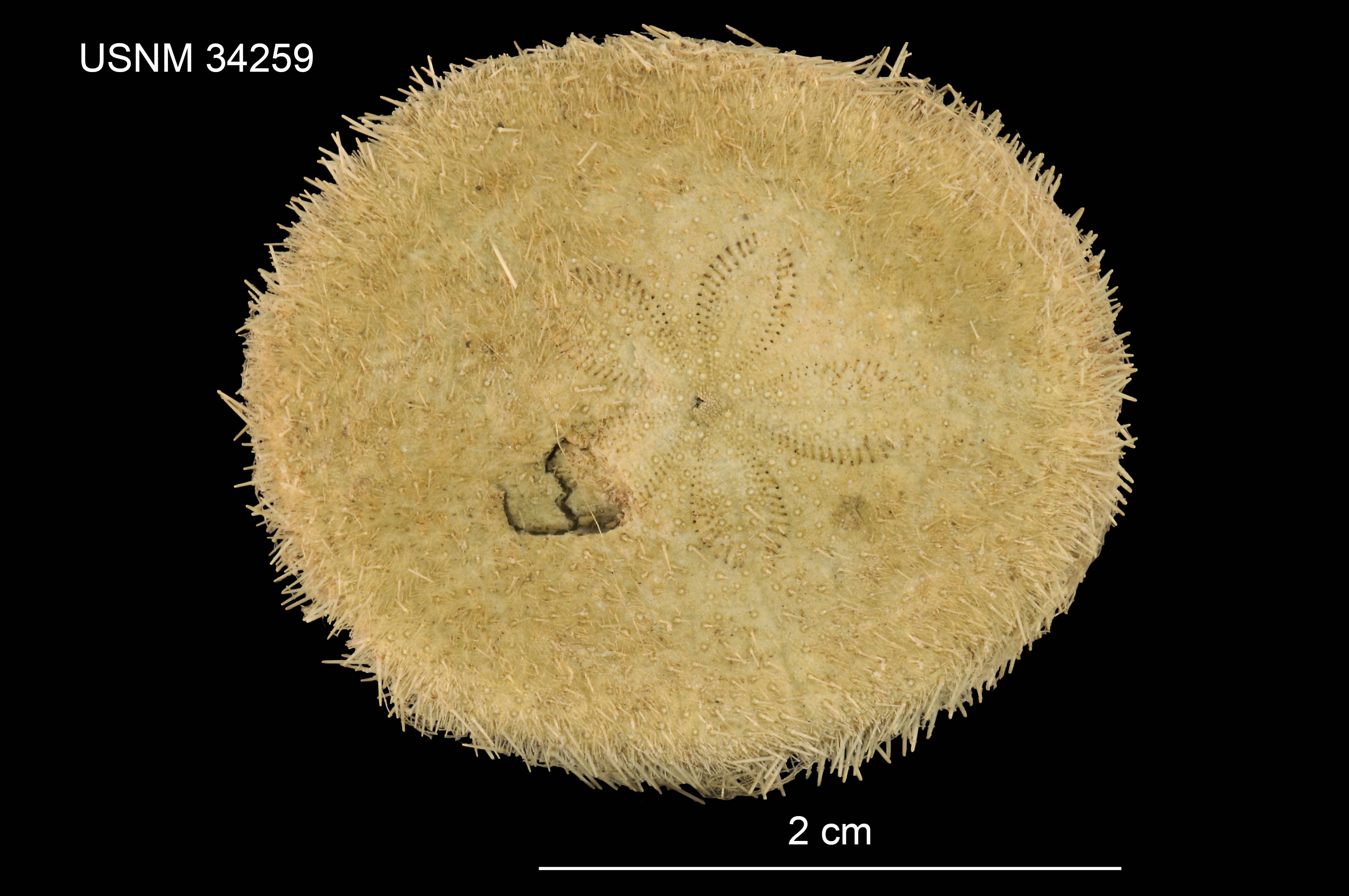
Clypeaster leptostracon

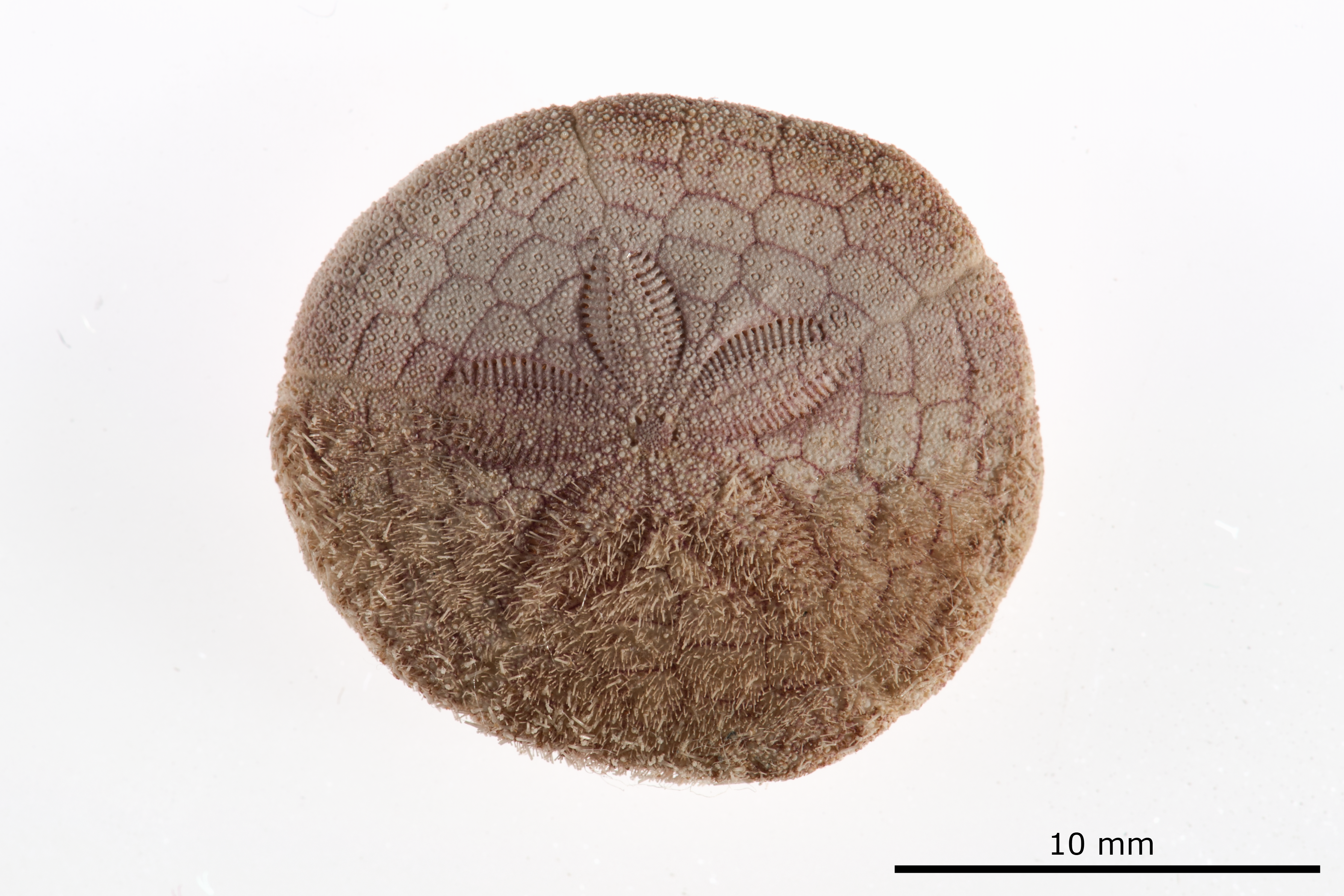
Clypeaster luetkeni

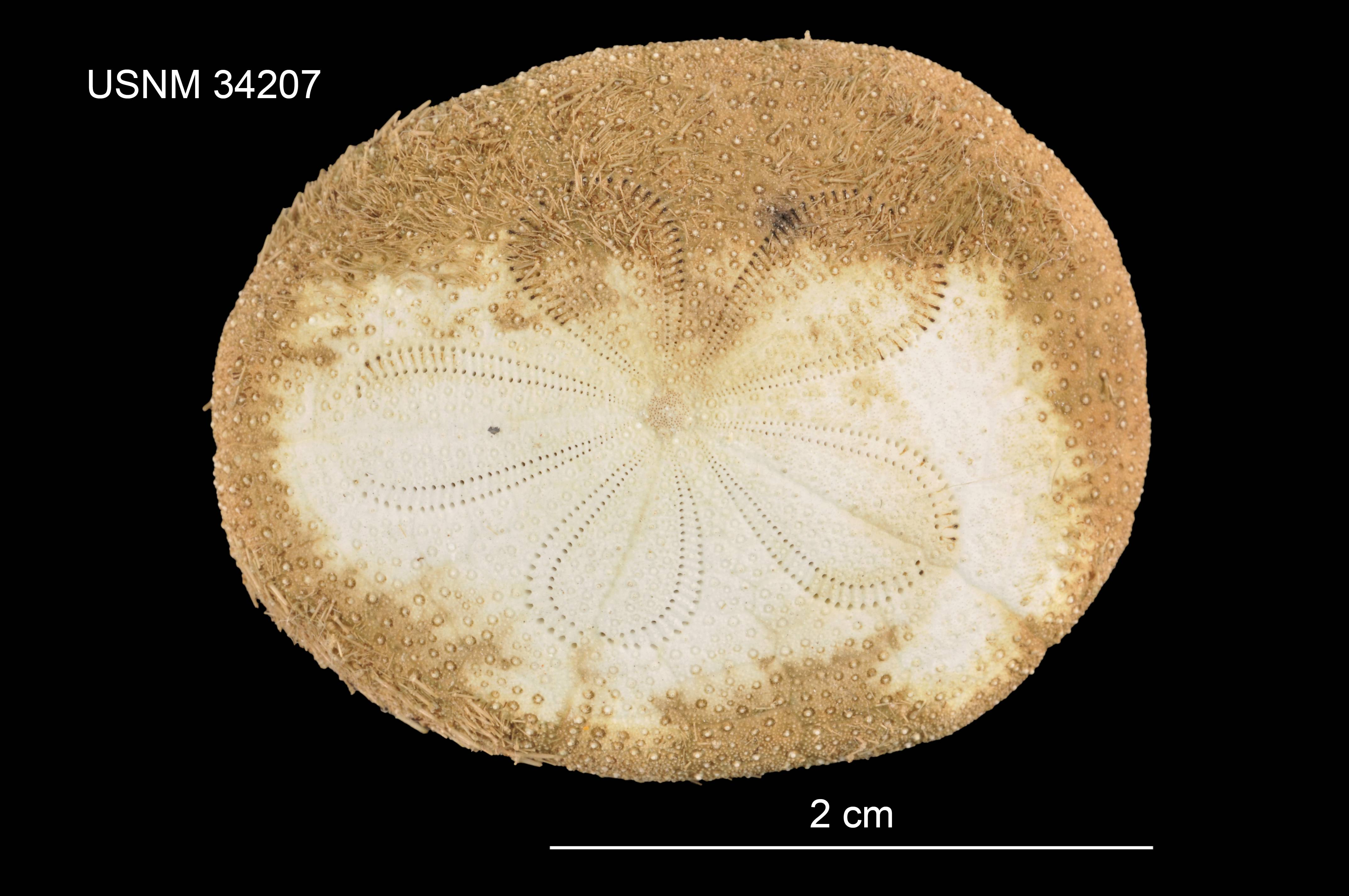
Clypeaster lytopetalus

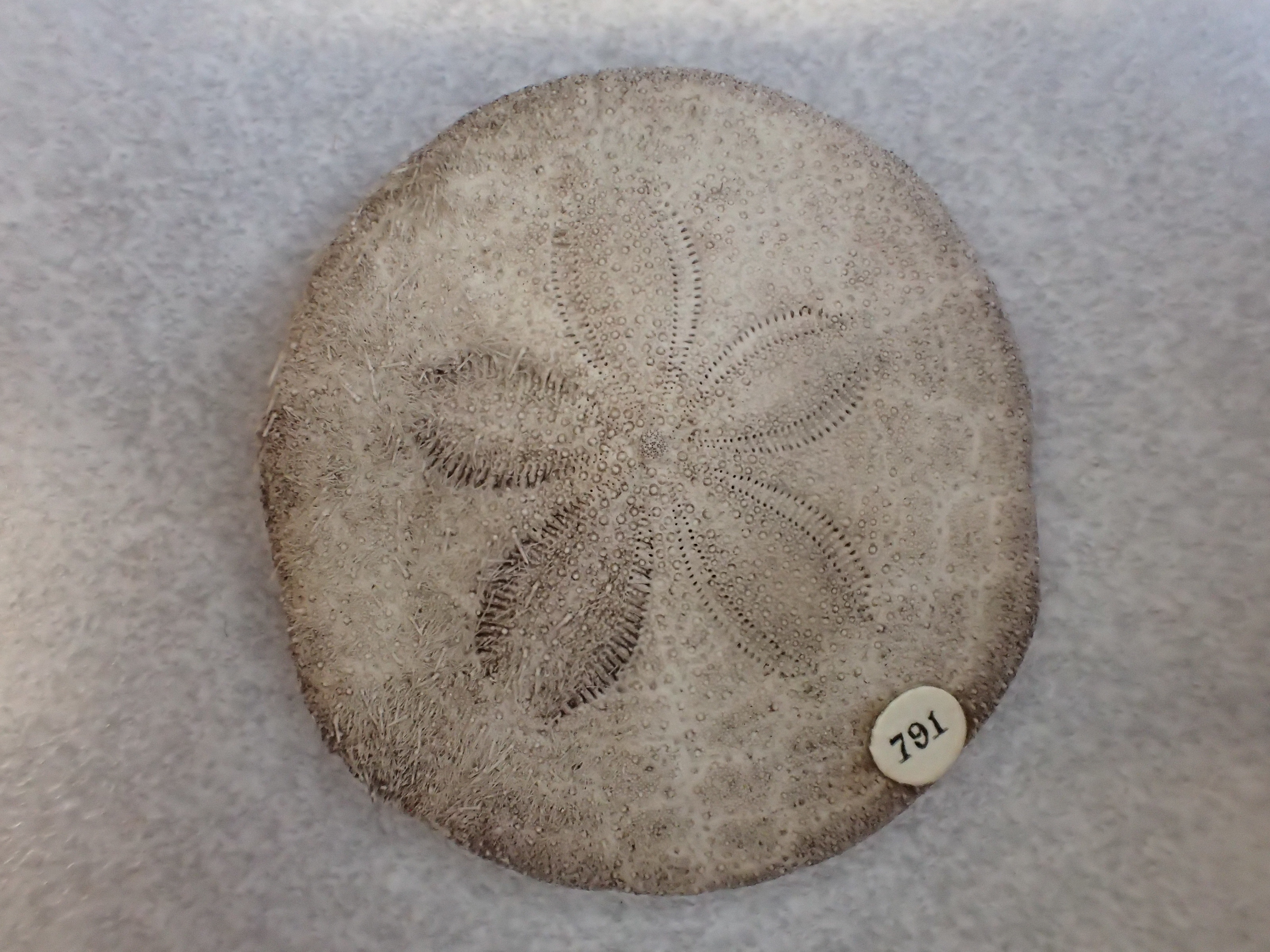
Clypeaster nummus

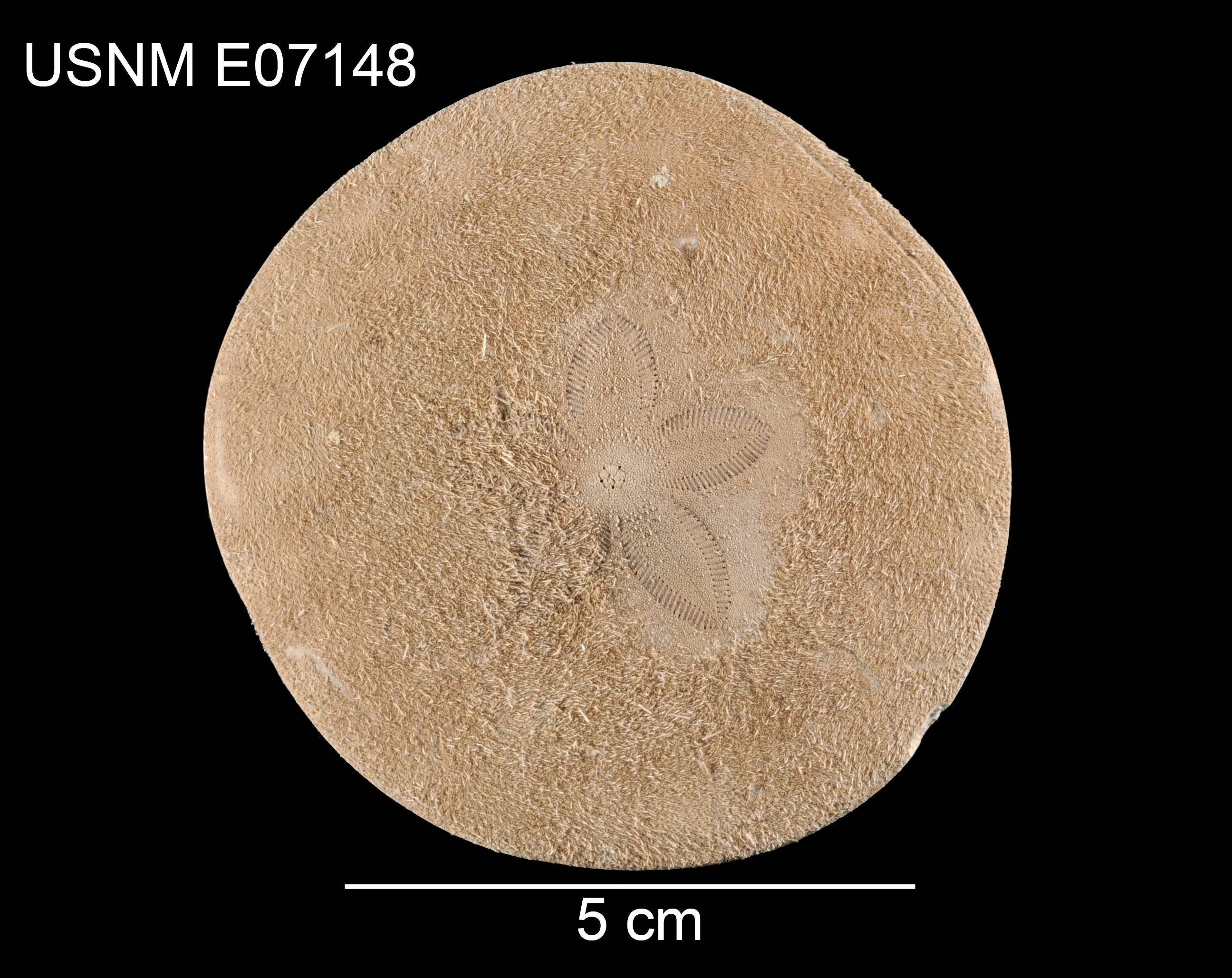
Clypeaster pateriformes

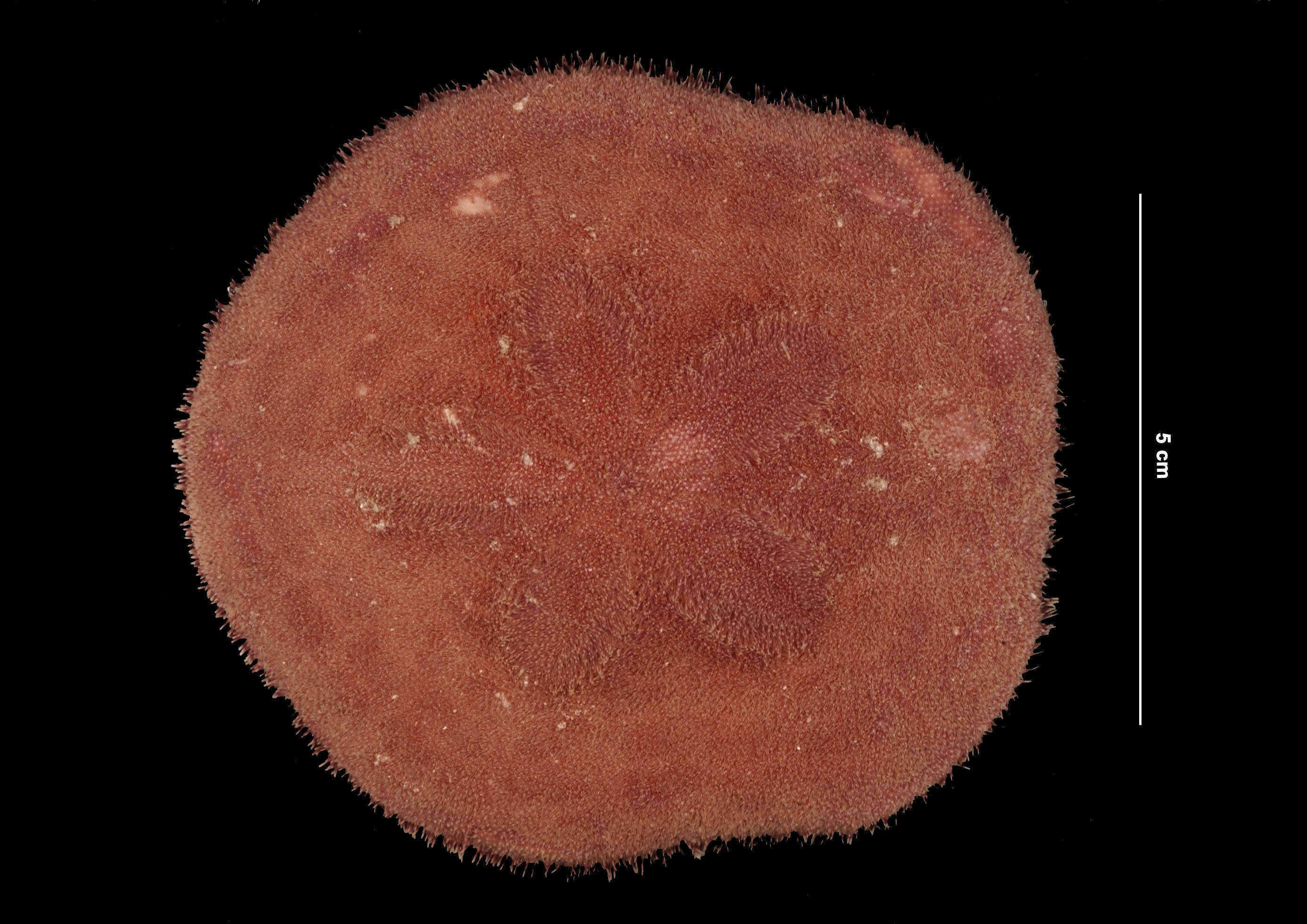
Clypeaster prostratus

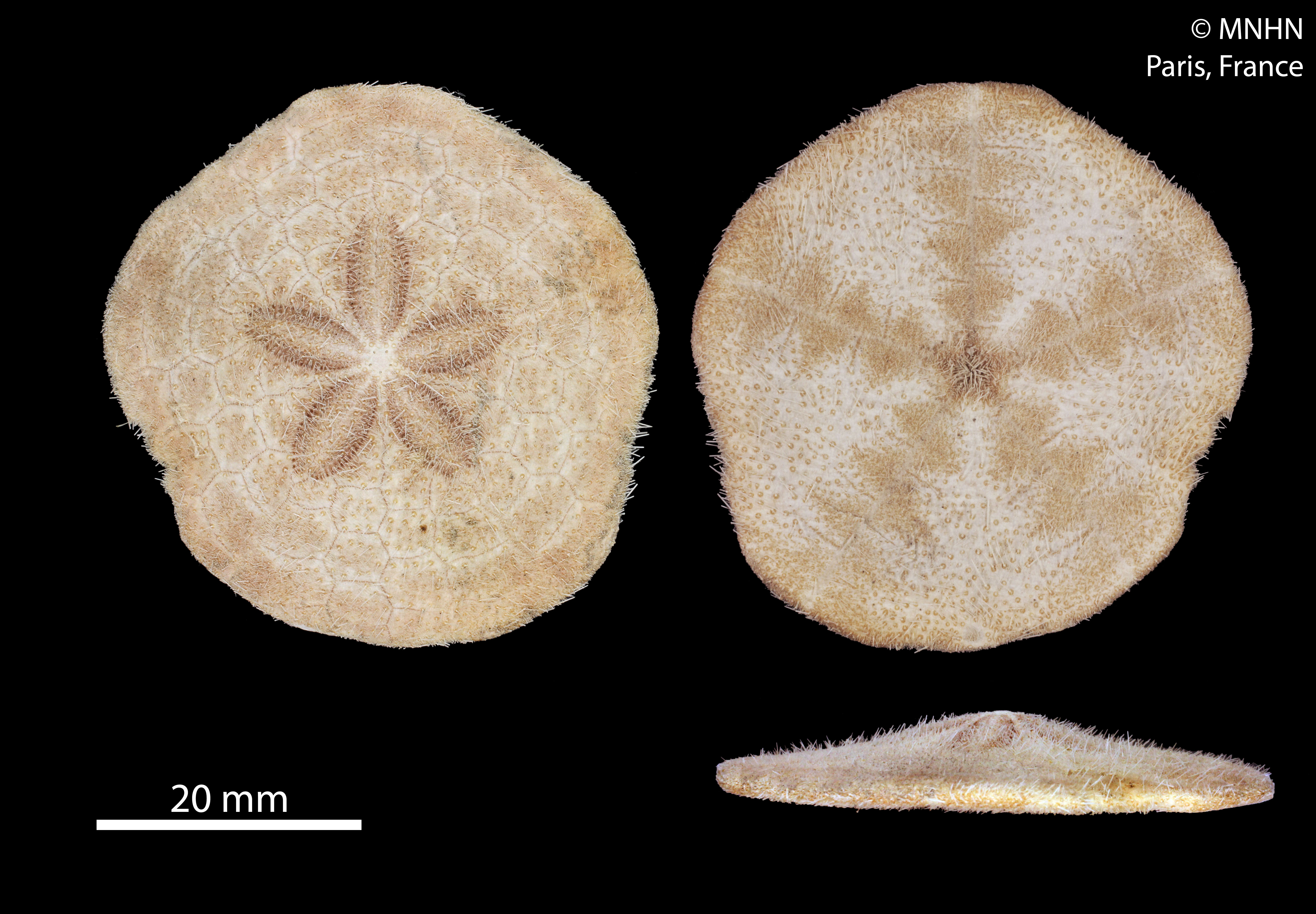
Clypeaster rarispinus (MNHN)

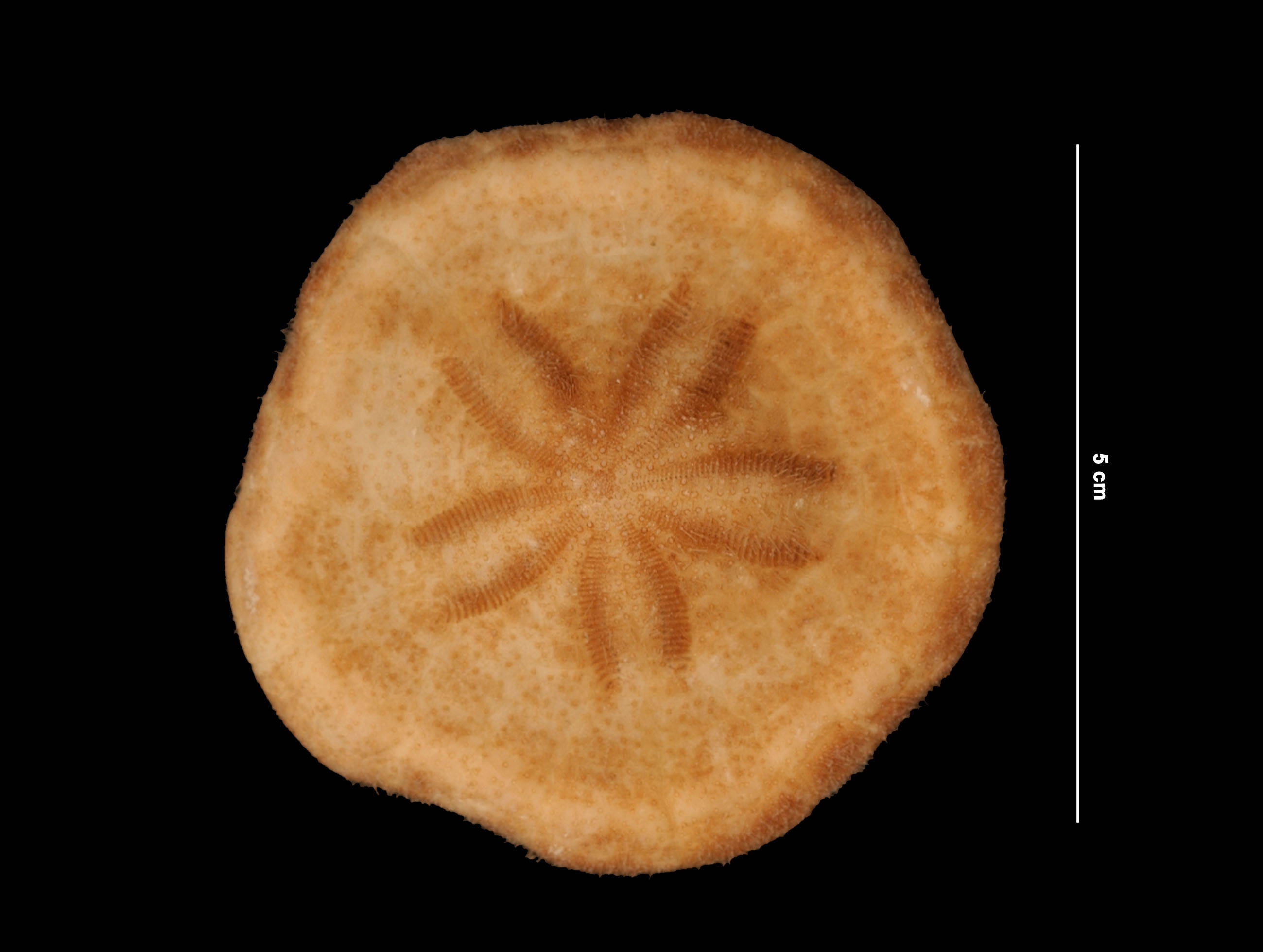
Clypeaster raveneli

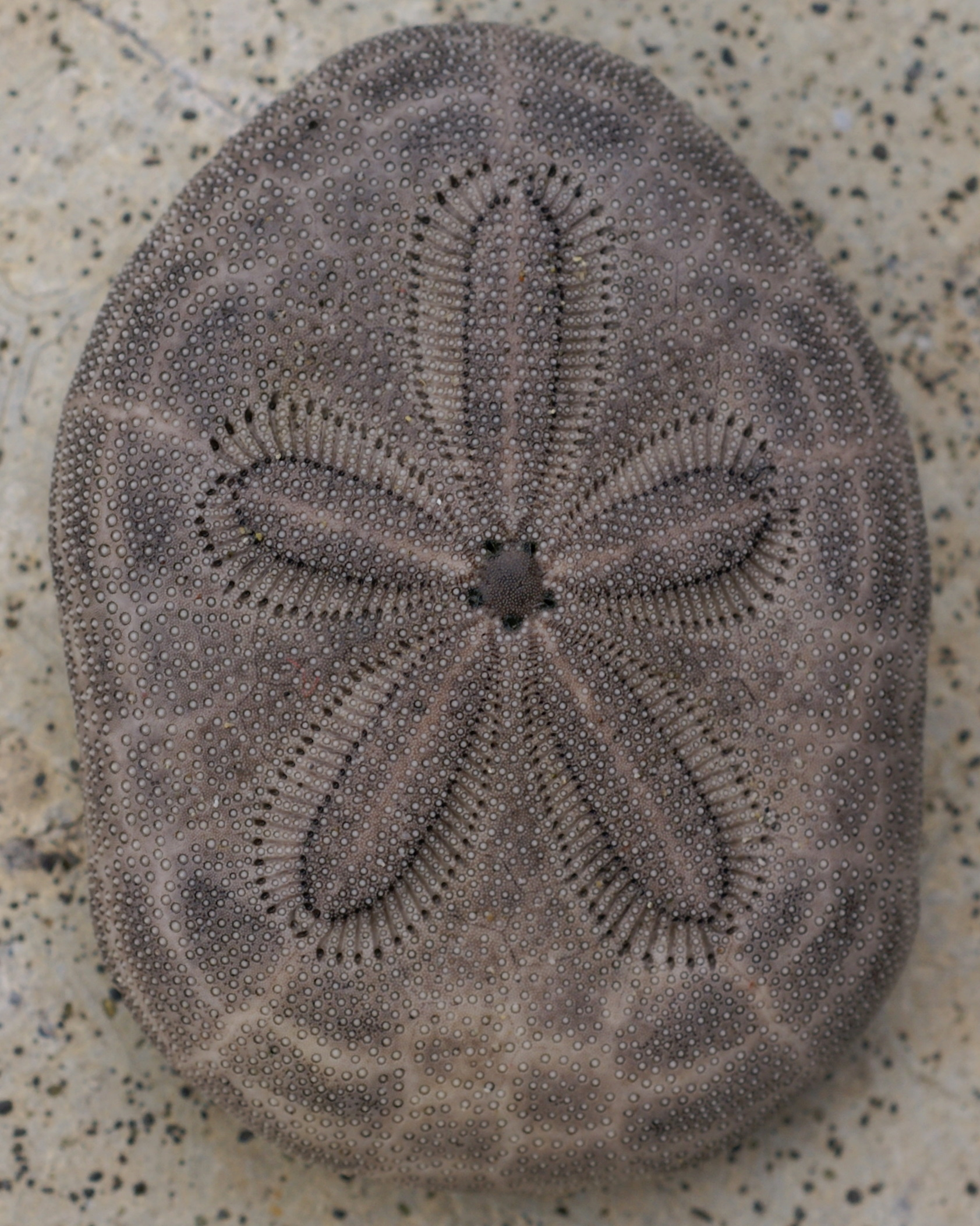
Clypeaster reticulatus

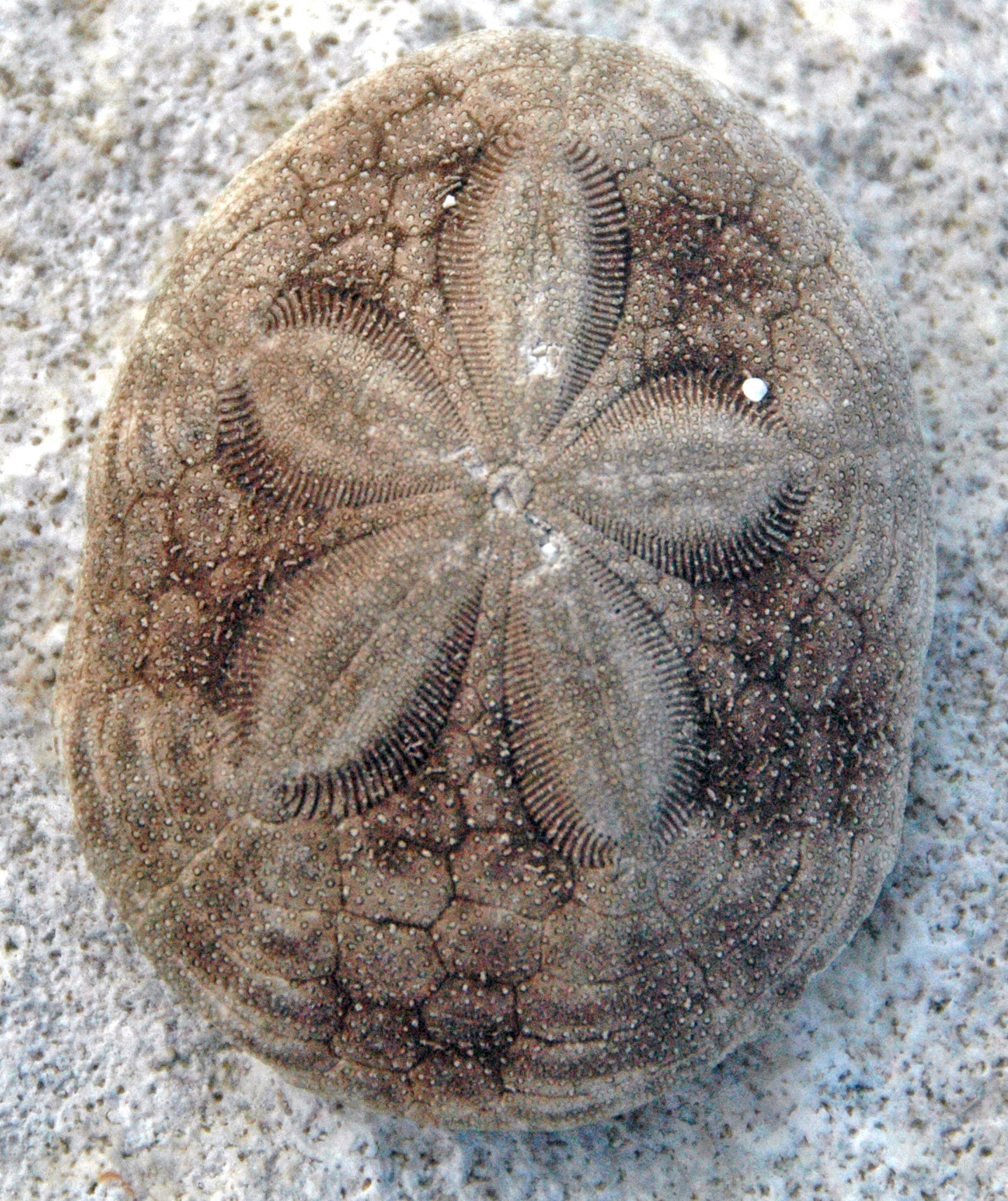
Clypeaster rosaceus test in the Bahamas.

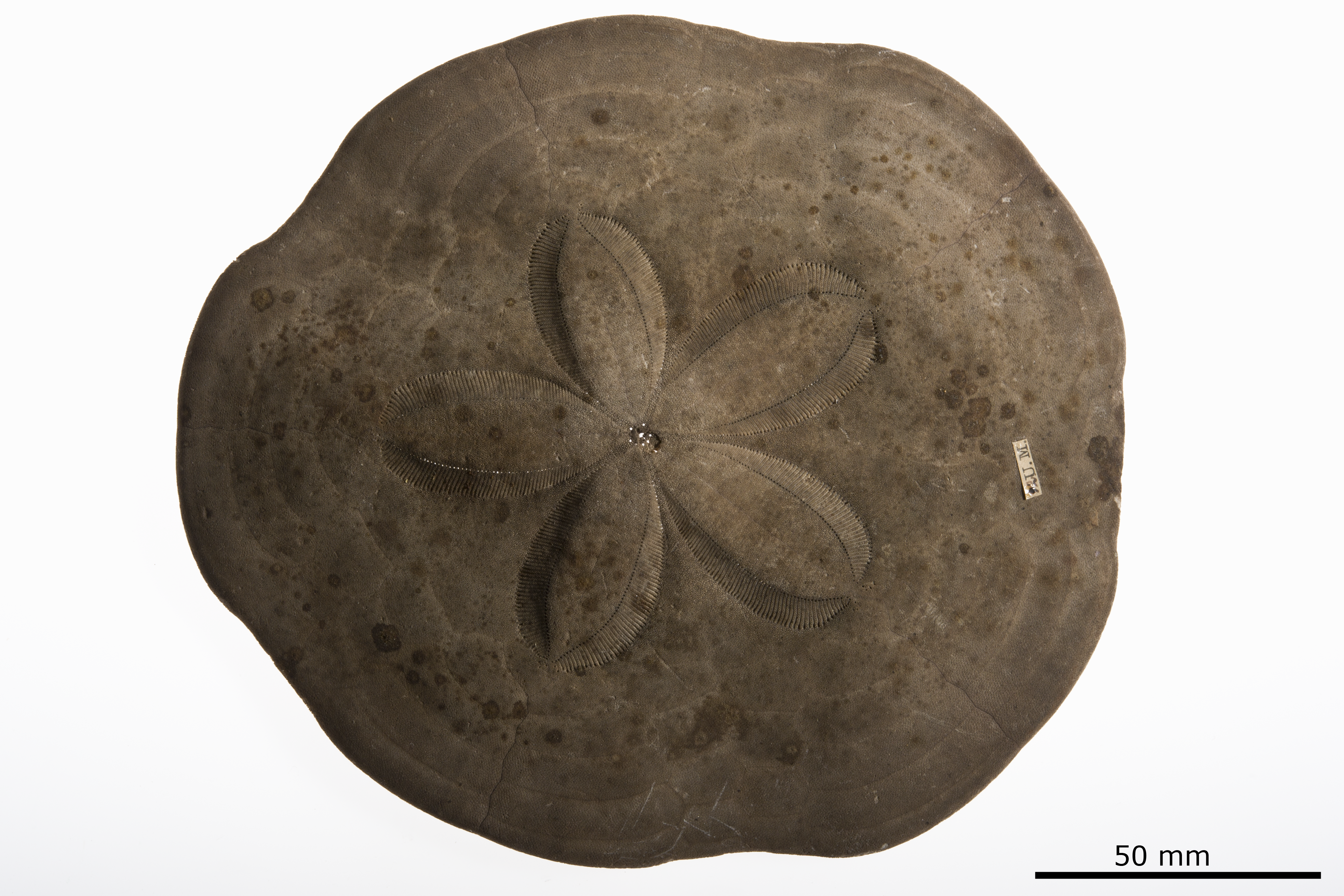
Clypeaster rotundus

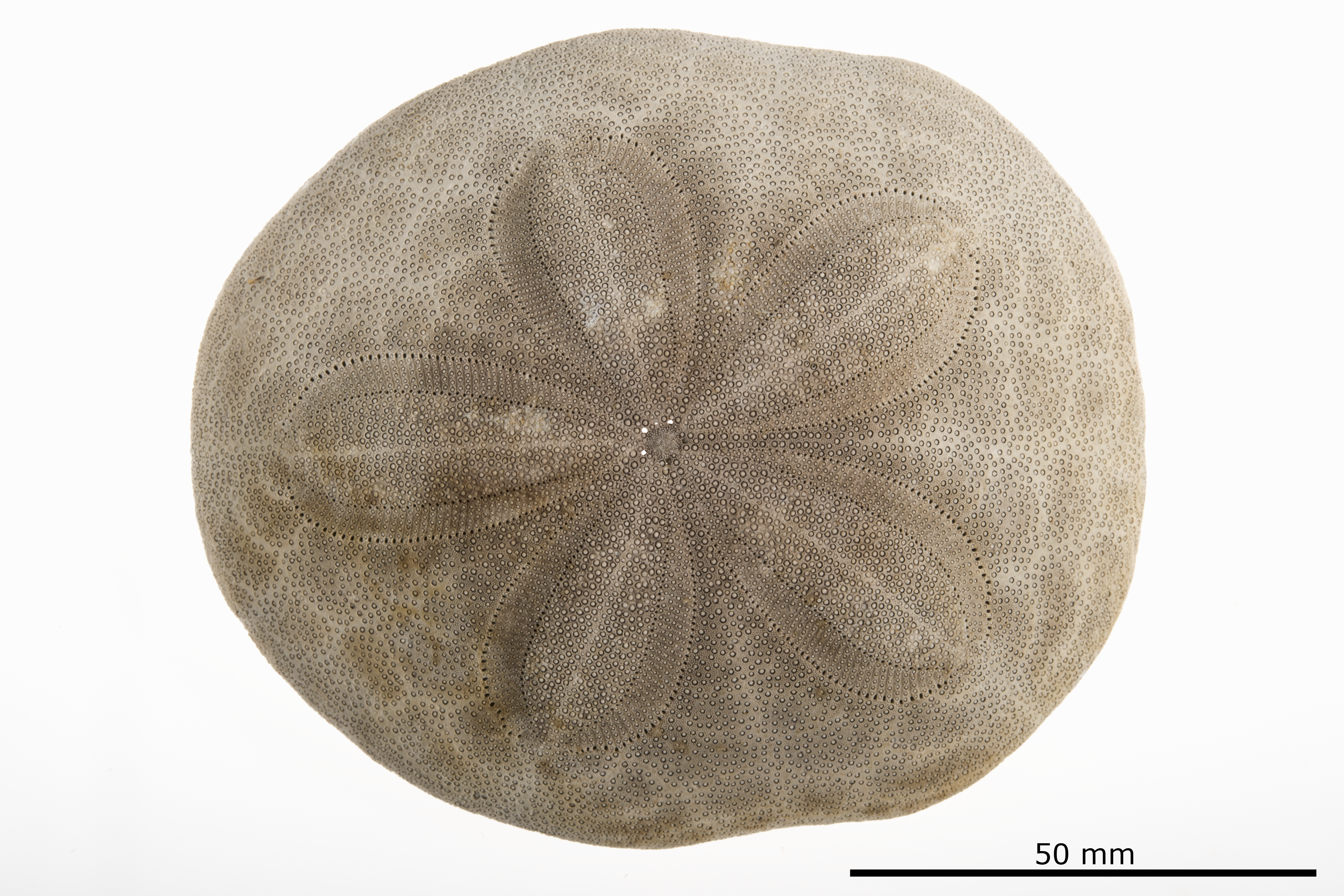
Clypeaster speciosus

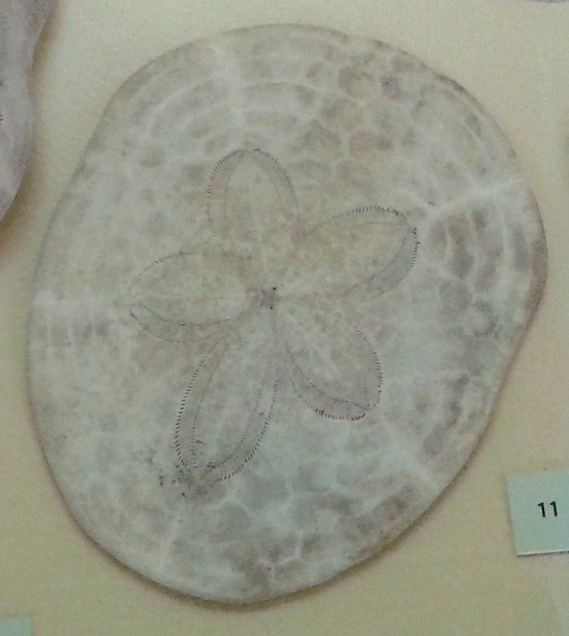
Clypeaster subdepressus

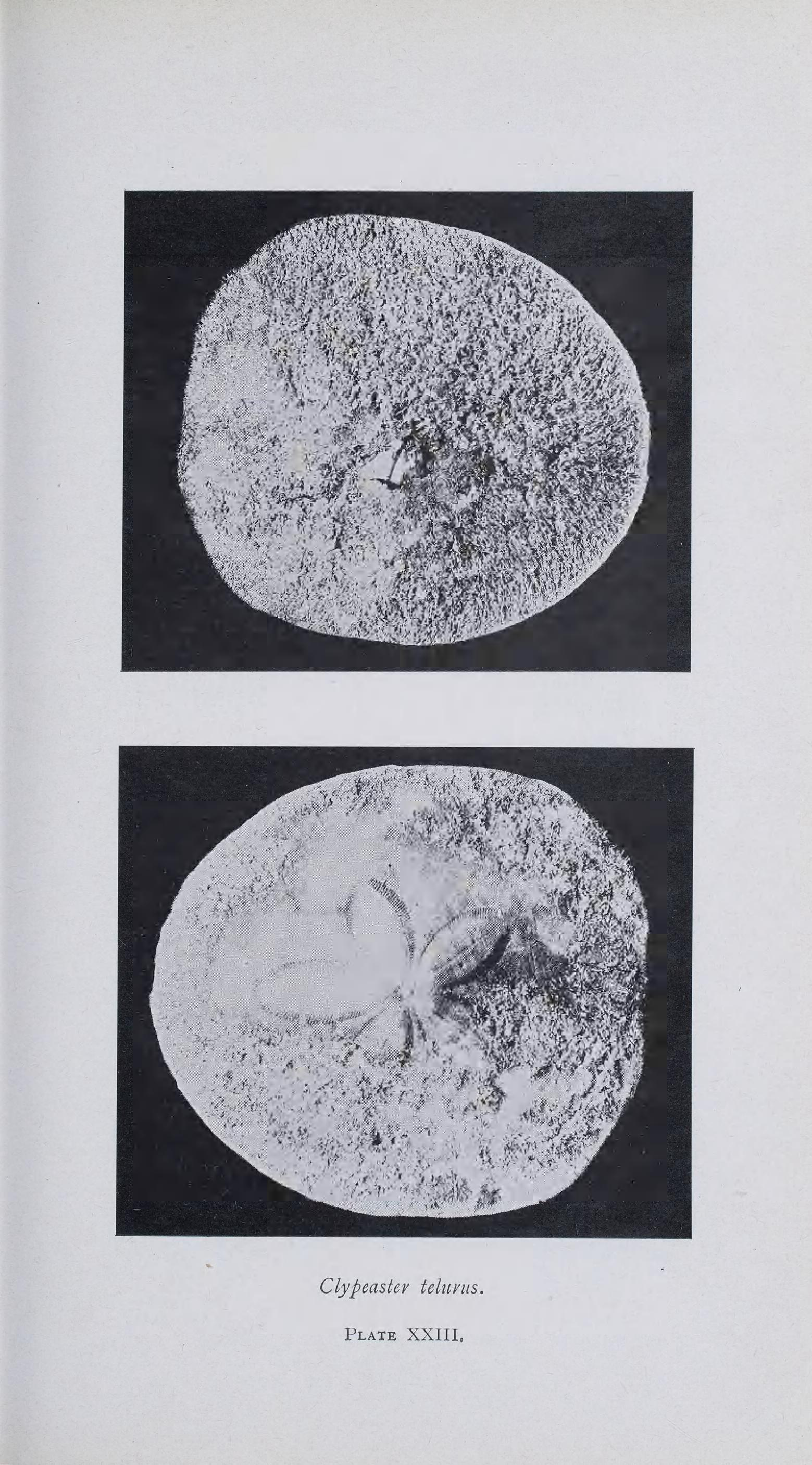
Clypeaster telurus

== Gallery ==
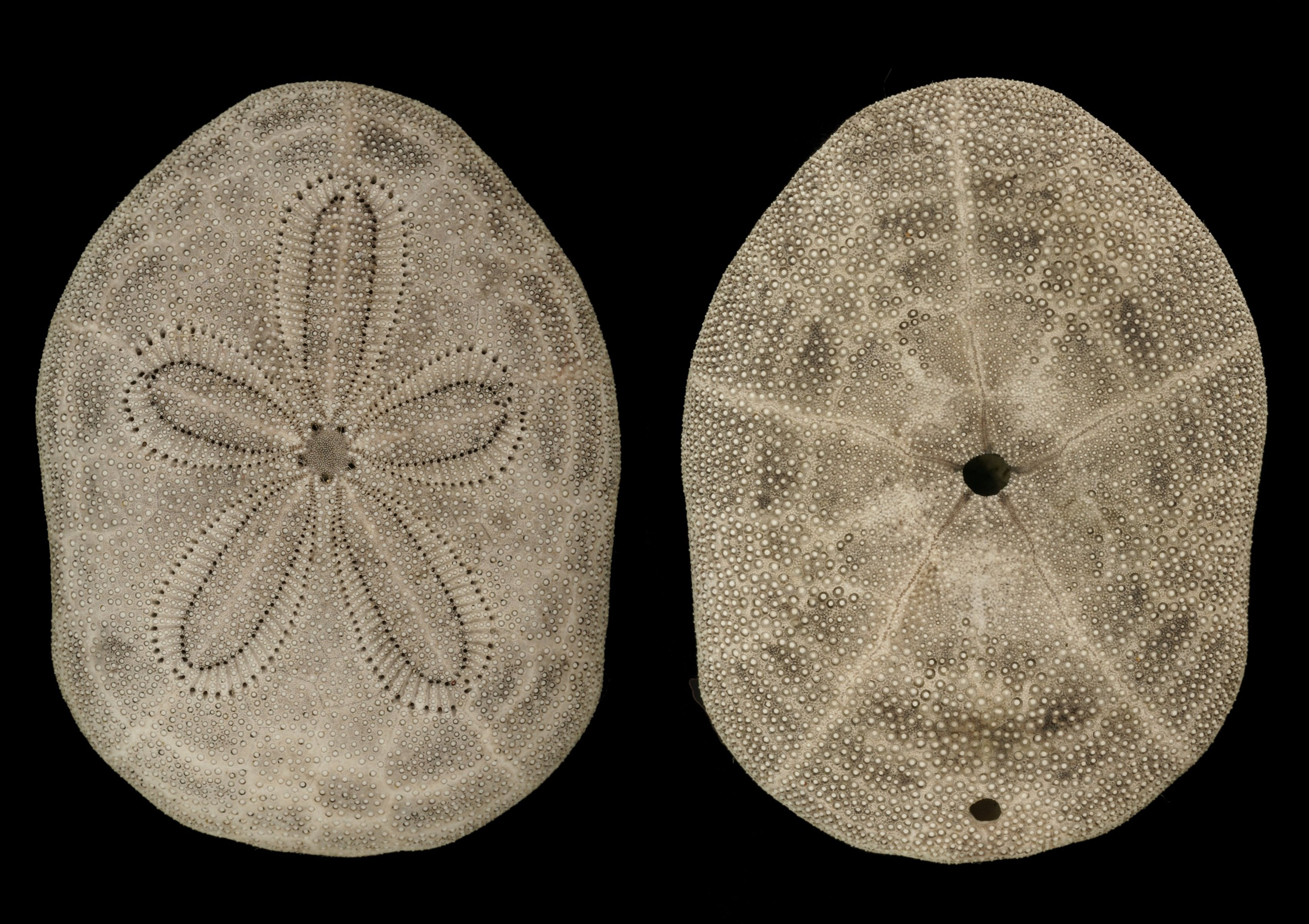
Clypeaster reticulatus

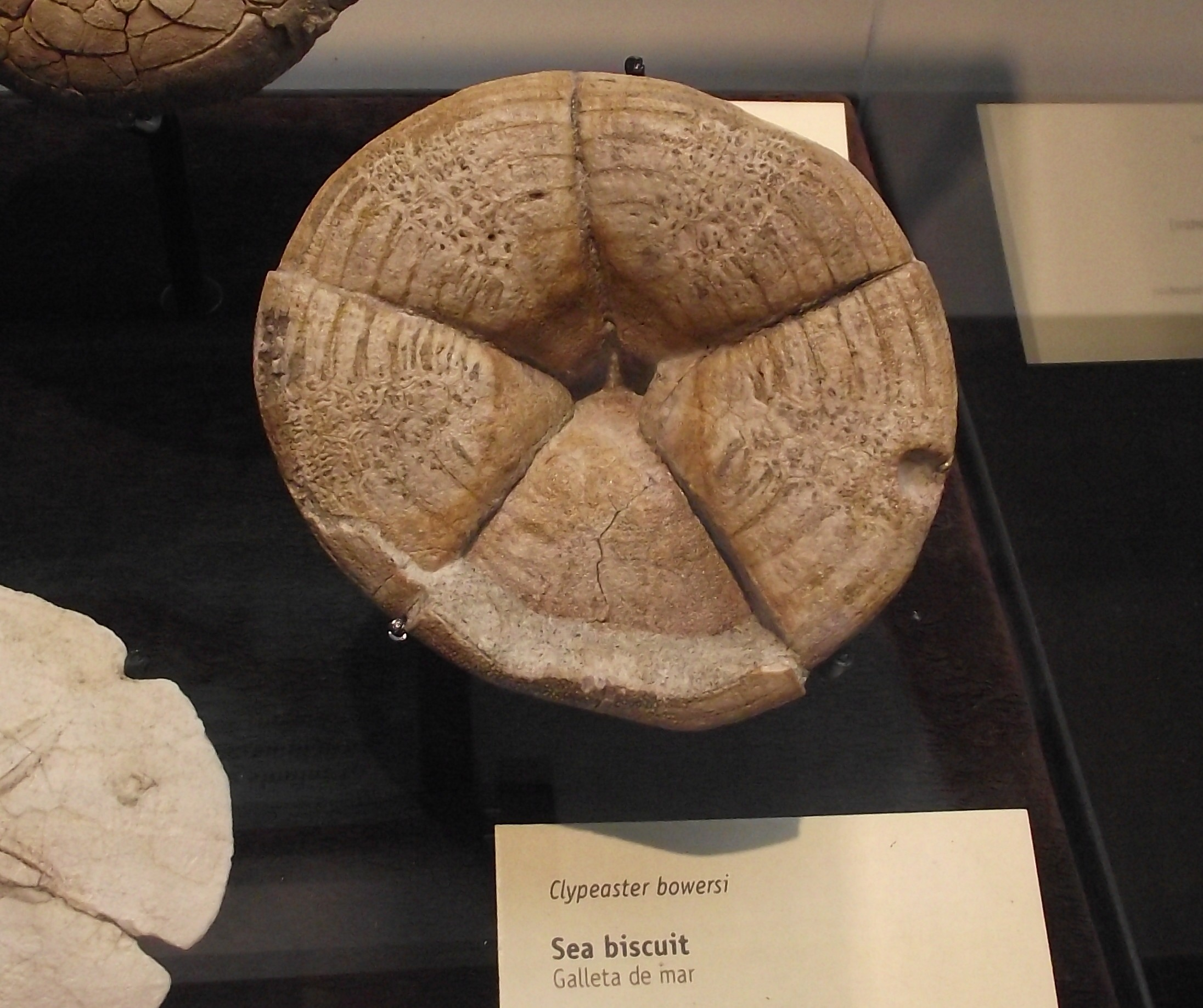
Fossil of Clypeaster bowersi the San Diego Natural History Museum, California

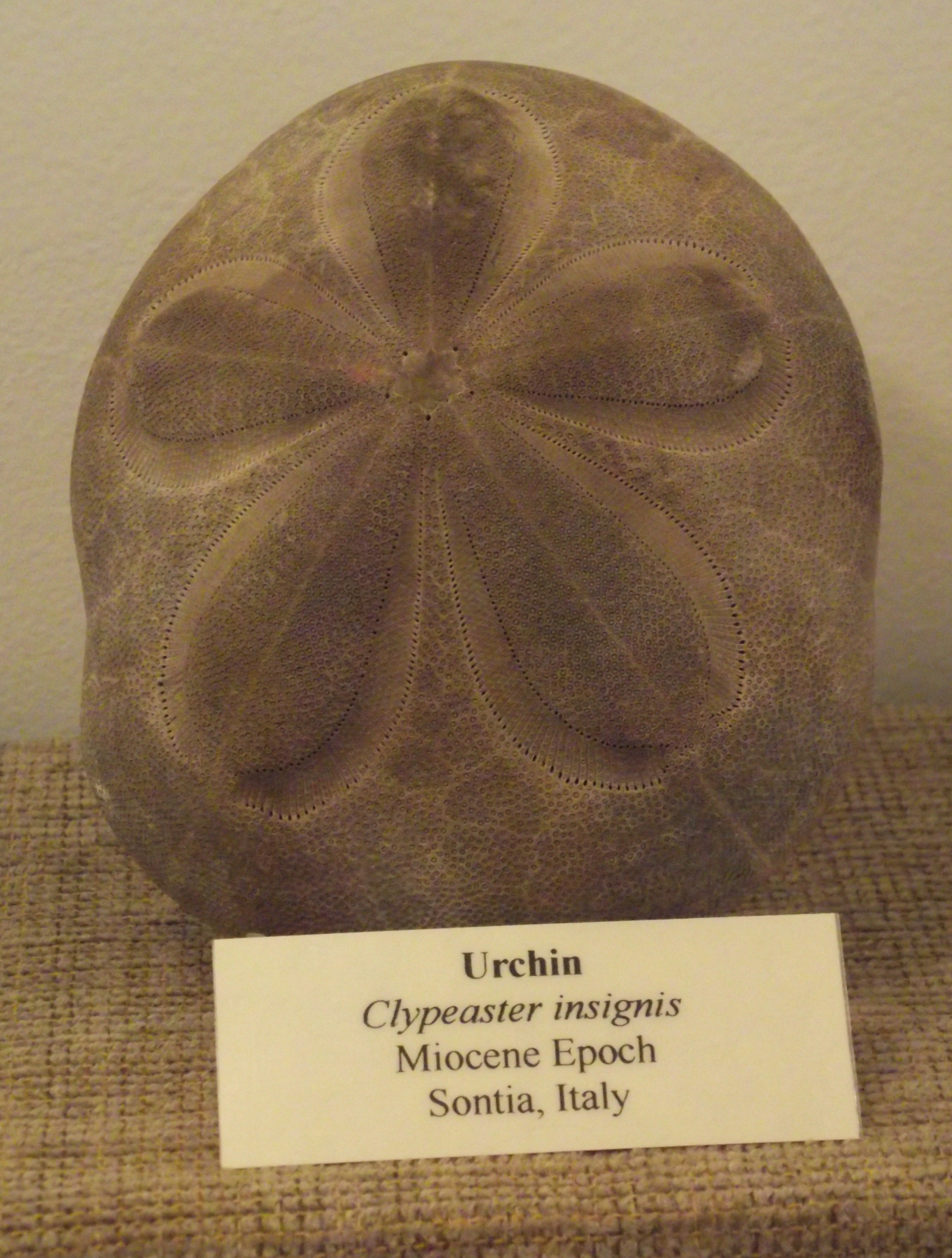
Fossil of Clypeaster insignis at the San Diego County Fair, California

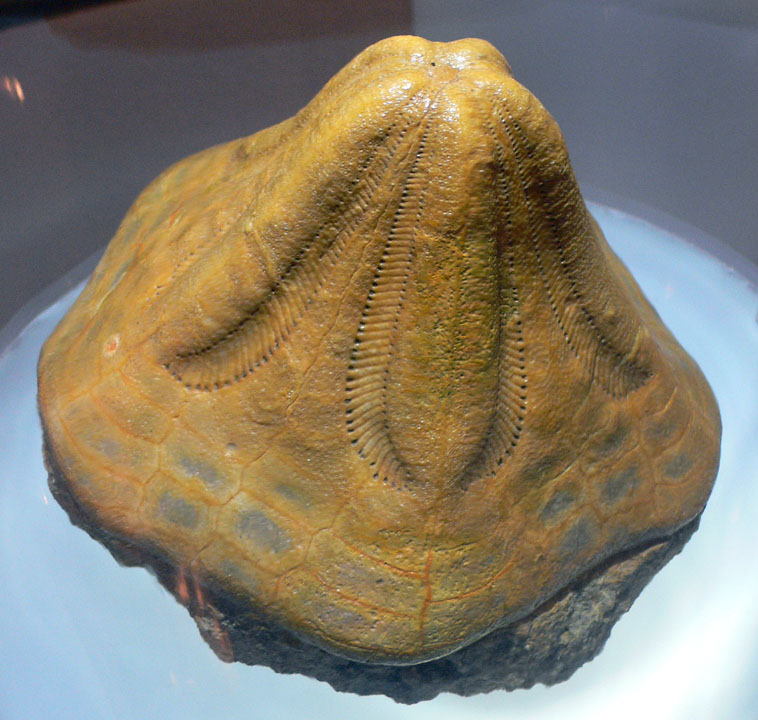
Fossil of Clypeaster portentosus at the Museo Arqueológico Municipal de Cartagena

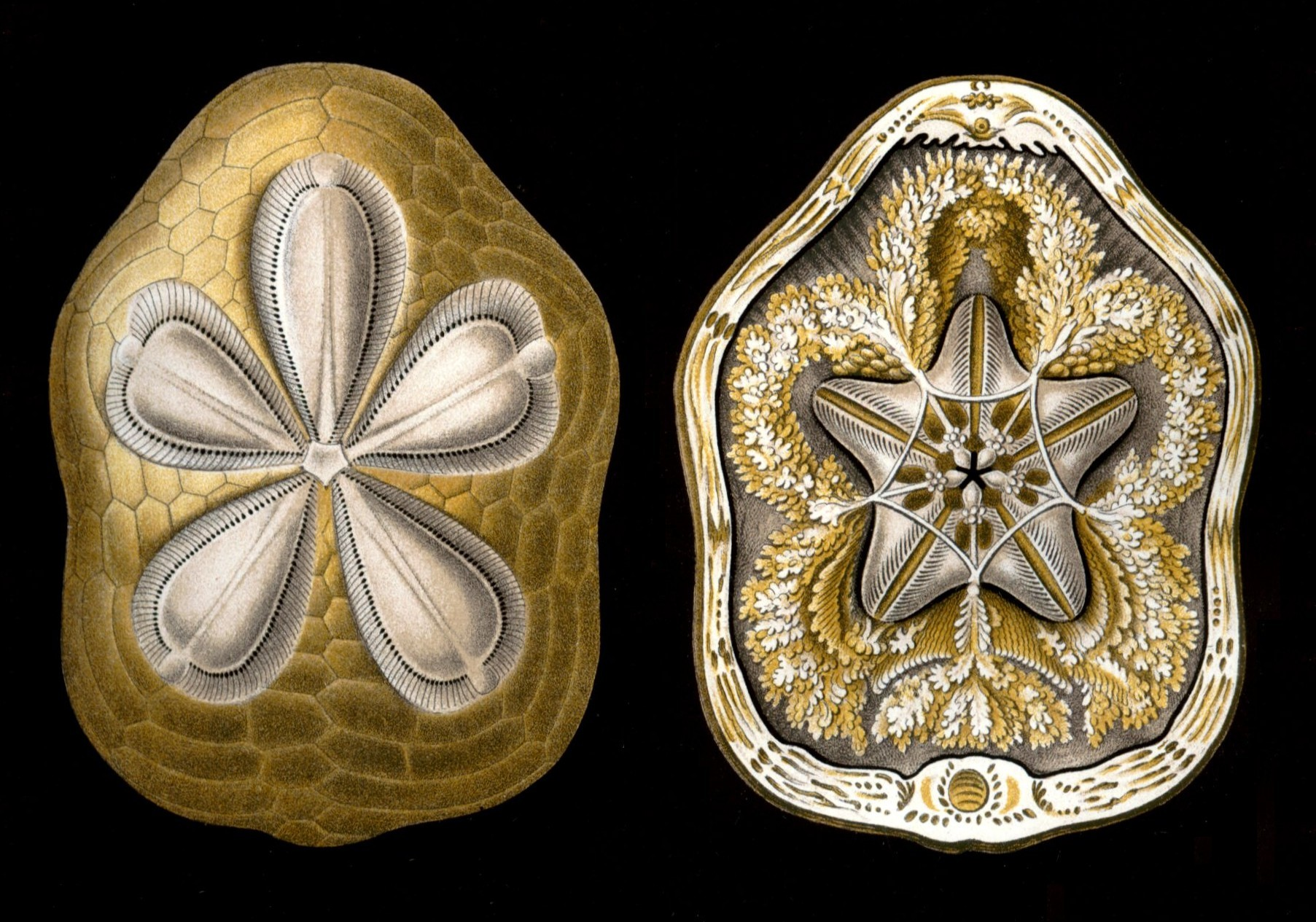
Clypeaster rosaceus (aboral and internal views), by Ernst Haeckel in Kunstformen der Natur (1904).

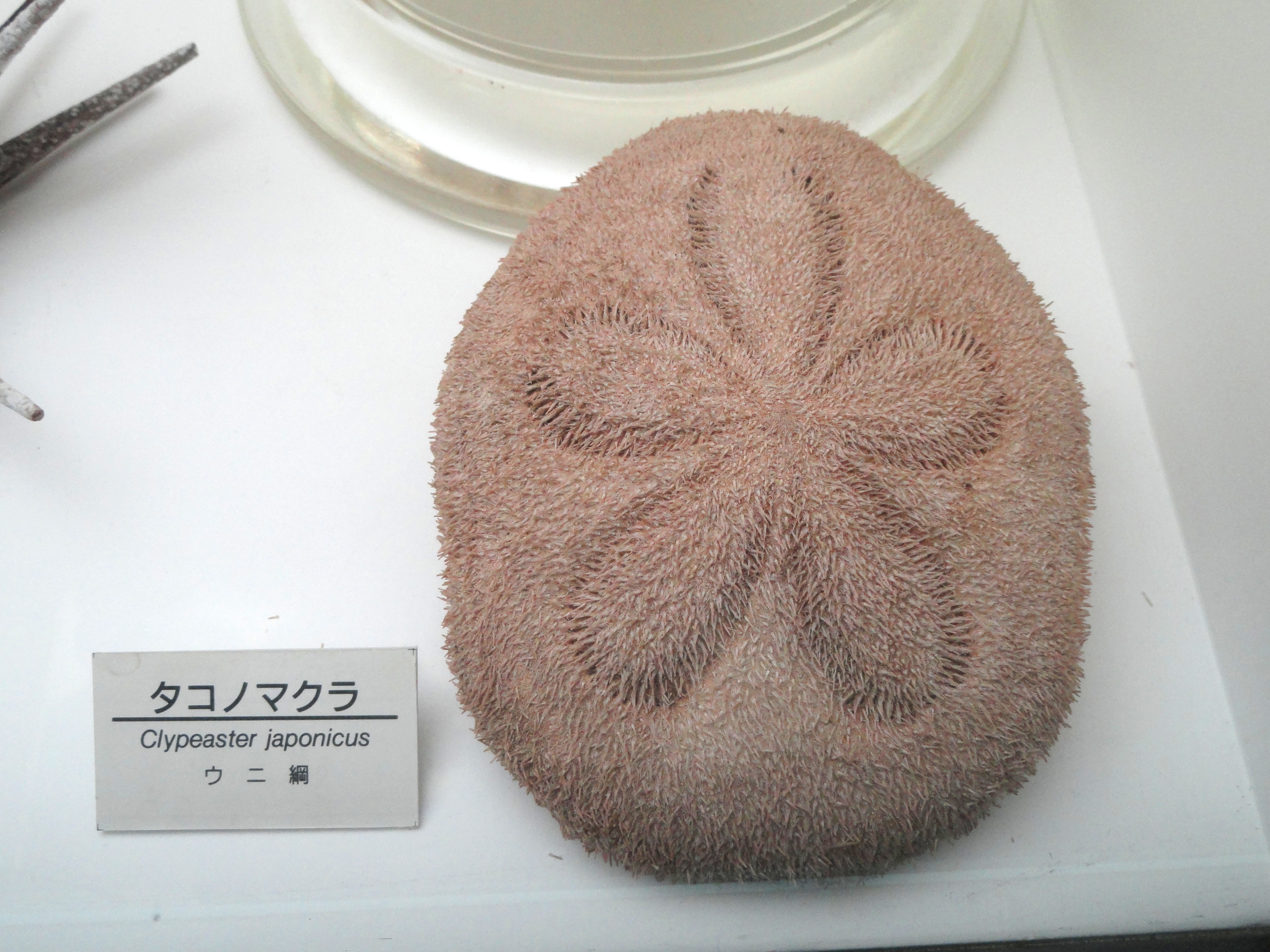
Clypeaster japonicus.
