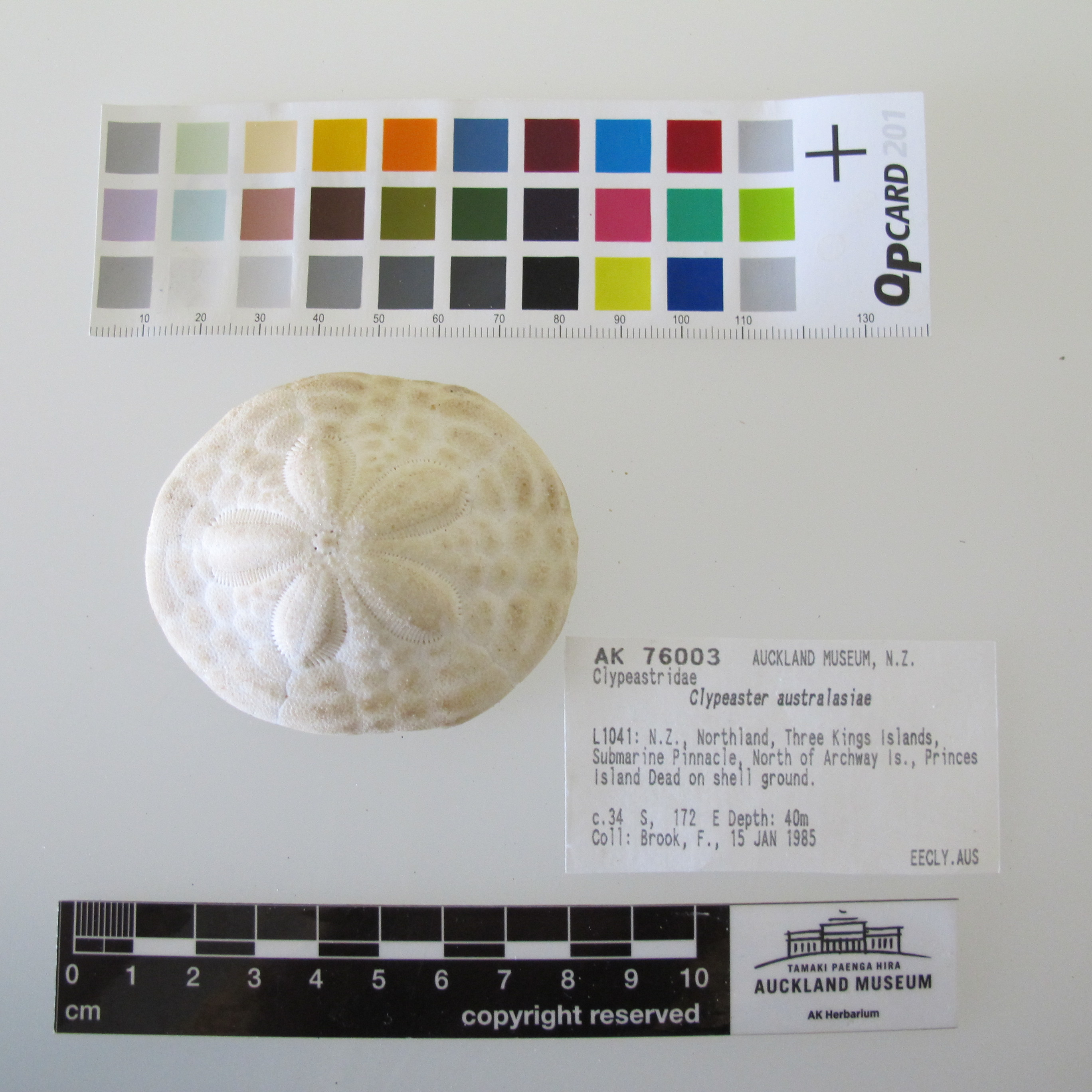
- Preserved specimen

Scientific classification
- Kingdom: Animalia
- Phylum: Echinodermata
- Class: Echinoidea
- Order: Clypeasteroida
- Family: Clypeasteridae
- Genus: Clypeaster
- Species: C. australasiae

Binomial name
- Clypeaster australasiae (Gray, 1851)

= Clypeaster australasiae =

Species of sea urchin

Clypeaster australasiae, the Australasian sand dollar, is a species of sea urchins of the family Clypeasteridae. Their armour is covered with spines. Clypeaster australasiae was first scientifically described in 1851 by Gray.

== Characteristics ==
Clypeaster australaiae is a dark red-brown to cream coloured animal with a slightly convex upper surface and distinct markings in a flower-petal pattern. The surface of the test is covered by a dense mat of small spines and tubercles.

Live specimen in New Zealand.

== Habitat ==
Silt, sand and reef to 130m depth. The animals can be abundant in some areas, but are not often seen as they usually bury themselves in the sediment and prefer deeper water.

== Distribution ==
Port Phillip Heads, Victoria, to Bowen, Queensland, and western Tasmania. Also Lord Howe Island and Norfolk Island.

== Size ==
Length up to 150mm.
