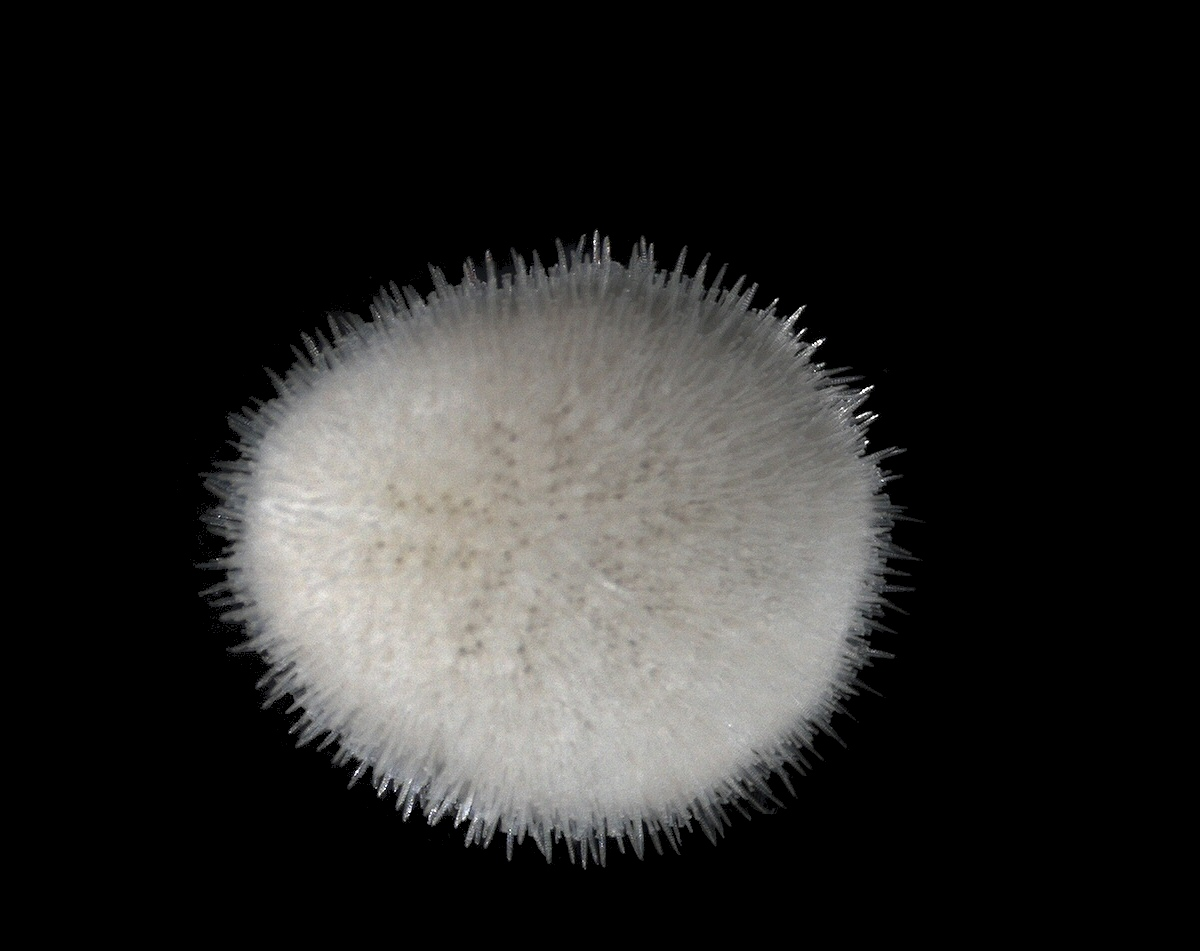
- Echinocyamus pusillus

Scientific classification
- Kingdom: Animalia
- Phylum: Echinodermata
- Class: Echinoidea
- Subclass: Euechinoidea
- Infraclass: Irregularia
- Superorder: Neognathostomata; Smith, 1981

Orders
- Cassiduloida; Clypeasteroida; Echinolampadoida

= Neognathostomata =

Neognathostomata Temporal range: Lower Jurassic–recent

Superorder of sea urchins

The Neognathostomata are a superorder of sea urchins.

== Description and characteristics ==
They are distinguished from other sea urchins by their irregular shape and a highly modified feeding lantern. The group includes the well known sand dollars, as well as some less familiar and extinct forms.

== Taxonomy ==
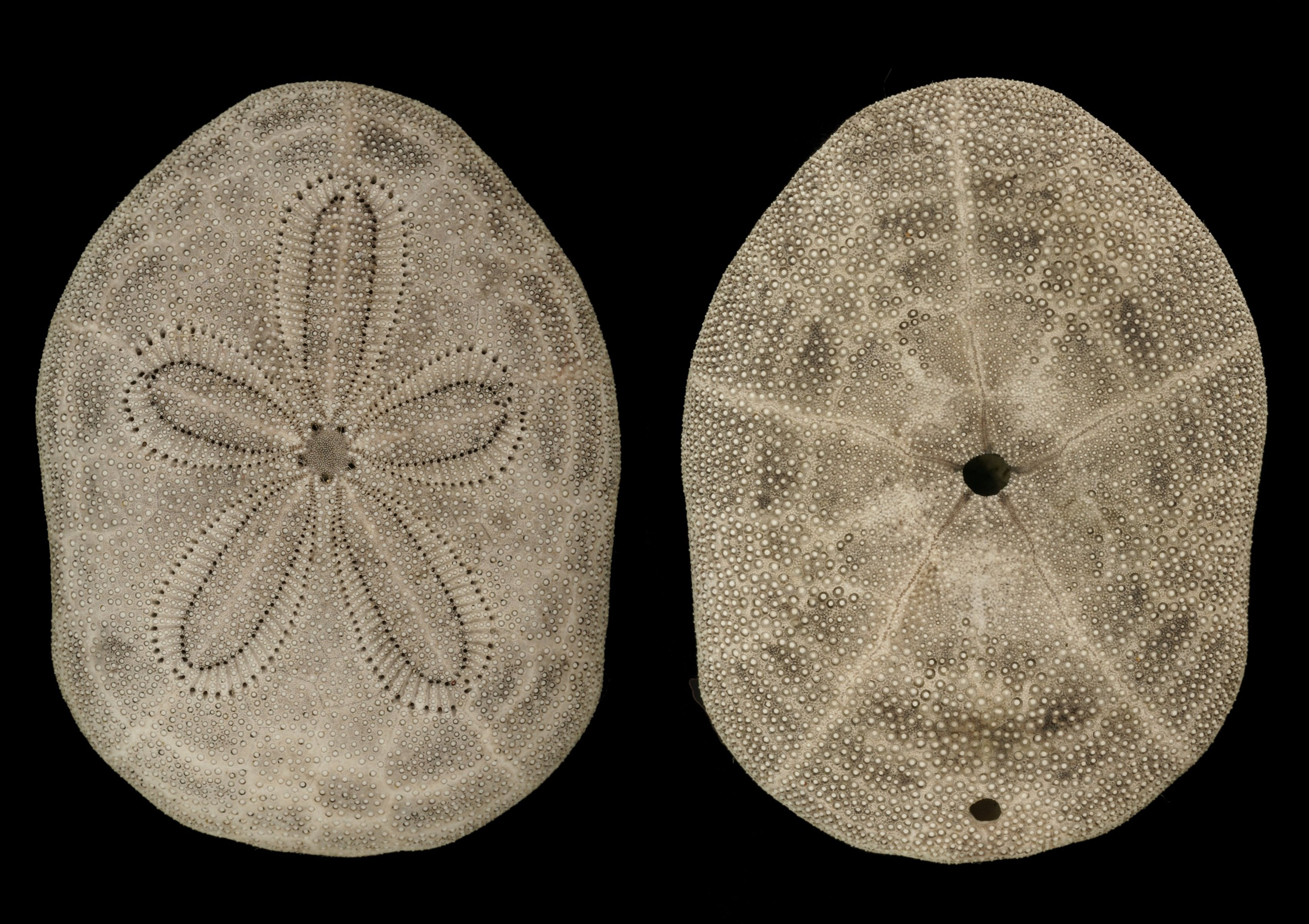
Test of a Clypeaster reticulatus (Clypeasterina).

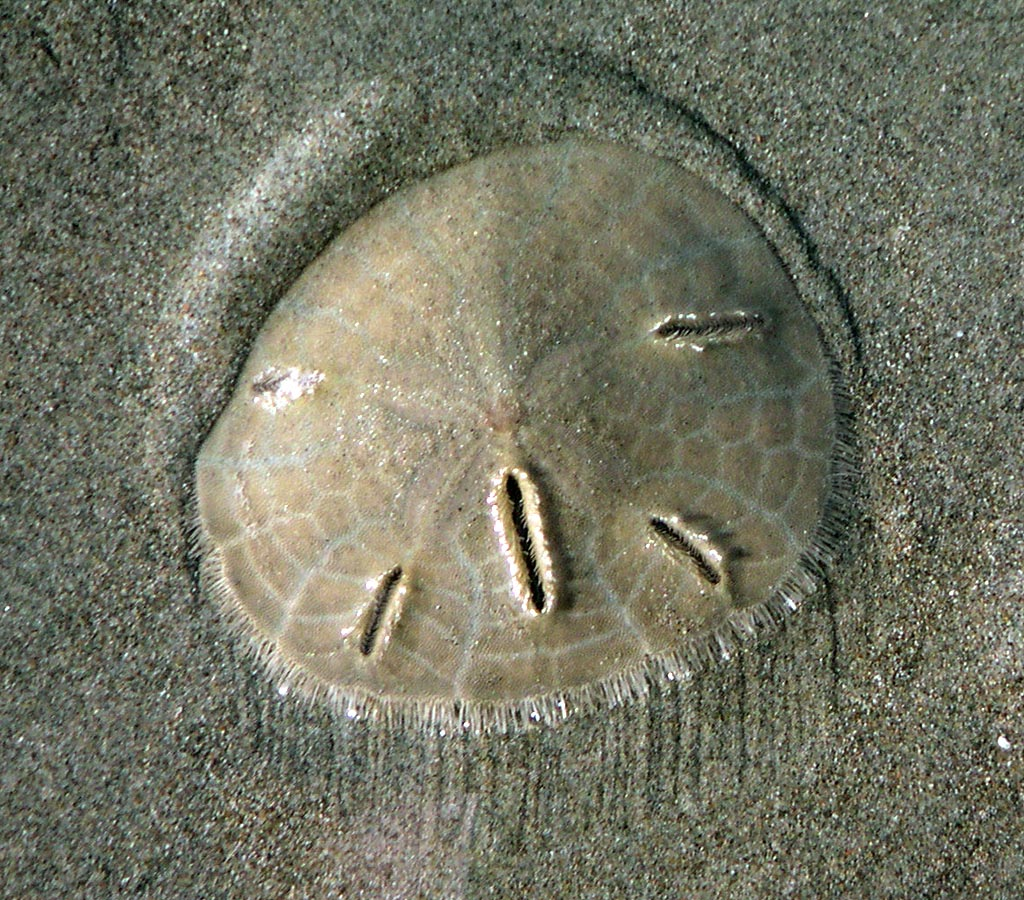
Mellita longifissa ("sand dollar").

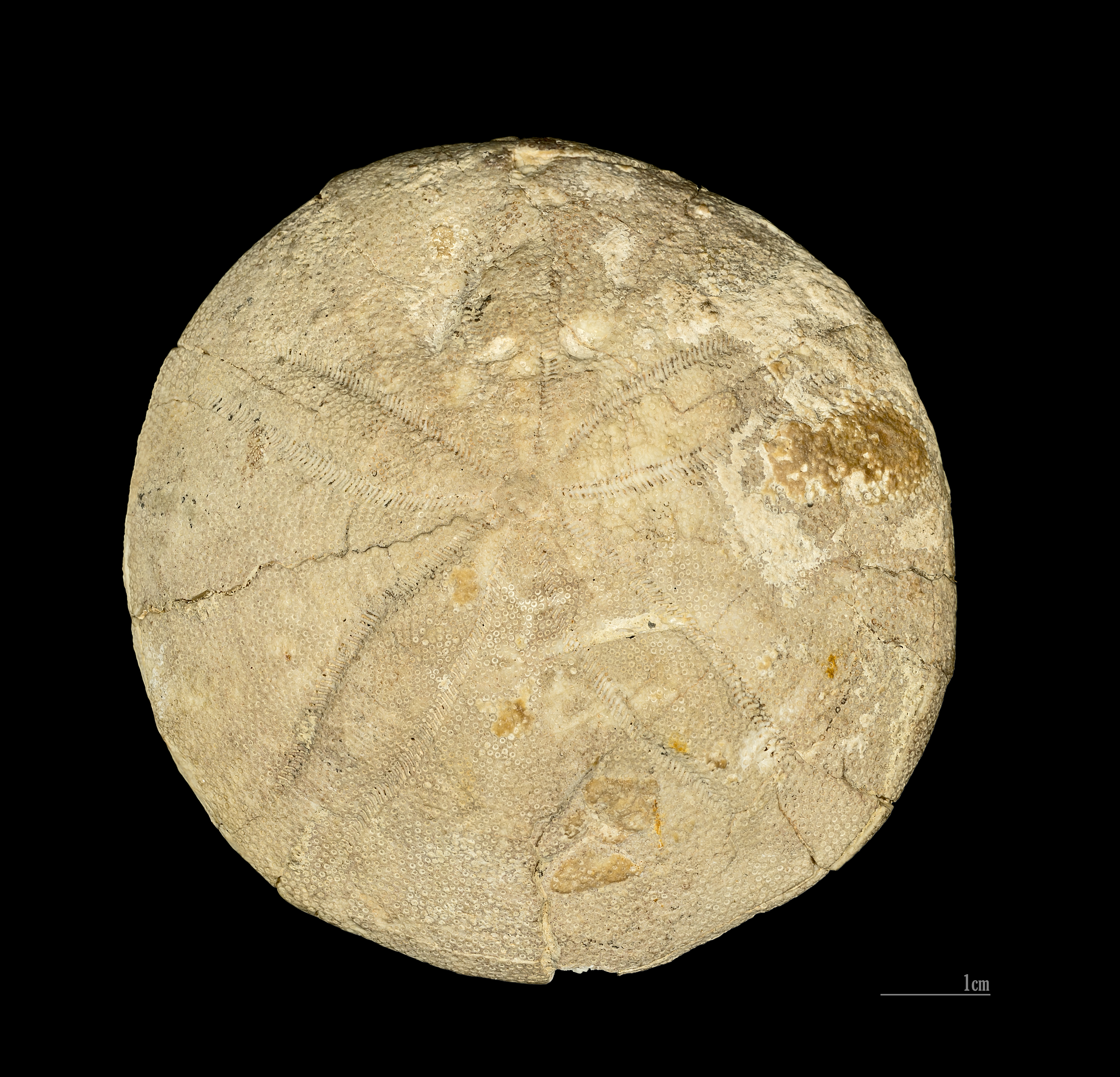
Fossil of an Echinolampas hemisphaericus (Echinolampadoida).

- family Apatopygidae Kier, 1962
- family Archiaciidae Cotteau & Triger, 1869 †
- order Cassiduloida
  - superfamily Cassidulina (Philip, 1963b)
    - family Cassidulidae (L. Agassiz and Desor, 1847)
  - superfamily Neolampadina (Philip, 1963b)
    - family Neolampadidae (Lambert, 1918a)
    - family Pliolampadidae (Kier, 1962) †
- order Clypeasteroida A. Agassiz, 1872 ("sand dollars")
  - suborder Clypeasterina
    - family Clypeasteridae L. Agassiz, 1835
    - family Fossulasteridae Philip & Foster, 1971 †
    - family Scutellinoididae Irwin, 1995 †
  - family Conoclypeidae von Zittel, 1879 †
  - family Faujasiidae Lambert, 1905 †
  - family Oligopygidae Duncan, 1889 †
  - family Plesiolampadidae Lambert, 1905 †
  - suborder Scutellina
    - infraorder Laganiformes
      - family Echinocyamidae Lambert & Thiéry, 1914
      - family Fibulariidae Gray, 1855
      - family Laganidae Desor, 1858
    - infraorder Scutelliformes
      - family Echinarachniidae Lambert in Lambert & Thiéry, 1914
      - family Eoscutellidae Durham, 1955 †
      - family Protoscutellidae Durham, 1955 †
      - family Rotulidae Gray, 1855
      - superfamily Scutelloidea Gray, 1825
        - family Abertellidae Durham, 1955 †
        - family Astriclypeidae Stefanini, 1912
        - family Dendrasteridae Lambert, 1900
        - family Mellitidae Stefanini, 1912
        - family Monophorasteridae Lahille, 1896 †
        - family Scutasteridae Durham, 1955 †
        - family Scutellidae Gray, 1825
      - family Taiwanasteridae Wang, 1984
    - family Scutellinidae Pomel, 1888a †
- family Clypeidae Lambert, 1898 †
- family Clypeolampadidae Kier, 1962 †
- order Echinolampadoida
  - family Echinolampadidae Gray, 1851a
- family Nucleolitidae L. Agassiz & Desor, 1847 †
- family Pygaulidae Lambert, 1905 †
- genus Pygolampas Saucède, Dudicourt & Courville, 2012 †

The name Luminacea was proposed for a subgroup containing all neognathostomates except Apatopygidae:

- Irregularia
  - Atelostomata
  - Neognathostomata
    - Apatopygidae
    - Luminacea
      - Clypeasteroida sensu stricto (Clypeasterina)
      - Echinolampadacea
        - Cassiduloida
        - Scutelloida
          - Laganiformes
          - Scutelliformes
