= Ammotrophus cyclius =

Scientific classification
- Domain: Eukaryota
- Kingdom: Animalia
- Phylum: Echinodermata
- Class: Echinoidea
- Order: Clypeasteroida
- Family: Clypeasteridae
- Genus: Ammotrophus
- Species: A. cyclius

Binomial name
- Ammotrophus cyclius (Clark, 1928)

Species of sea urchin

Ammotrophus cyclius is a species of sand dollar of the family Clypeasteridae. Their external skeleton, known as a test, is covered with spines. It belongs to the genus Ammotrophus and lives in the seas off southern Australia. Ammotrophus cyclius was first scientifically described in 1928 by Hubert Clark.
