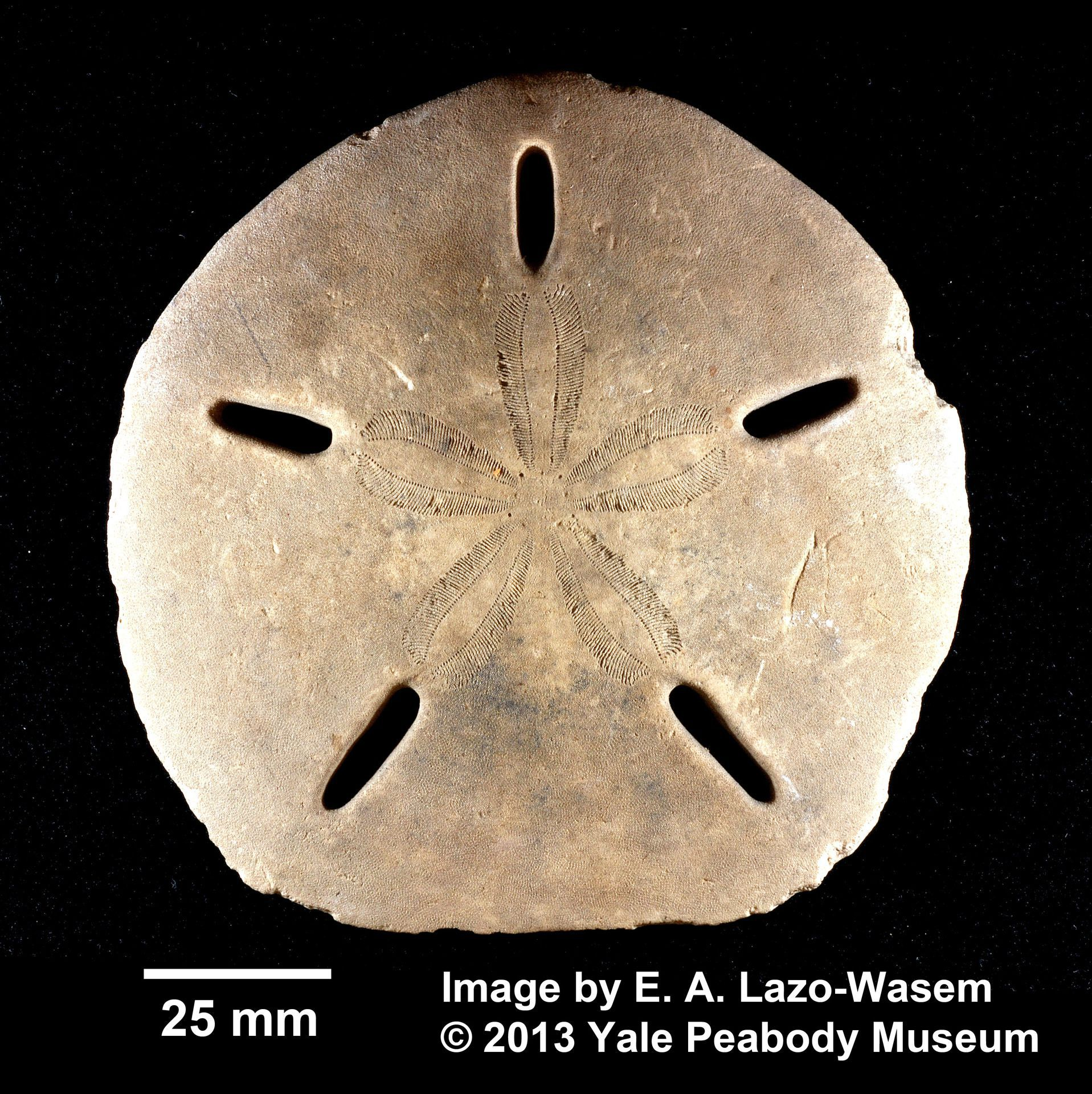

Scientific classification
- Kingdom: Animalia
- Phylum: Echinodermata
- Class: Echinoidea
- Order: Clypeasteroida
- Family: Astriclypeidae
- Genus: Astriclypeus
- Species: A. mannii

Binomial name
- Astriclypeus mannii Verrill, 1867

Synonyms
- Astriclypeus manni Verrill, 1867

= Astriclypeus mannii =

Species of sea urchin

Astriclypeus mannii is a species of sea urchin of the family Astriclypeidae. Their armour is covered with spines. It is placed in the genus Astriclypeus and lives in the sea. Astriclypeus mannii was first scientifically described in 1867 by Verrill.
