= Ammotrophus platyterus =

Scientific classification
- Domain: Eukaryota
- Kingdom: Animalia
- Phylum: Echinodermata
- Class: Echinoidea
- Order: Clypeasteroida
- Family: Clypeasteridae
- Genus: Ammotrophus
- Species: A. platyterus

Binomial name
- Ammotrophus platyterus (Clark, 1928)

Species of sea urchin

Ammotrophus platyterus is a species of sand dollar of the family Clypeasteridae. Their armour is covered with spines. It came from the genus Ammotrophus and lives in the sea. Ammotrophus platyterus was first scientifically described in 1928 by Hubert Clark.
