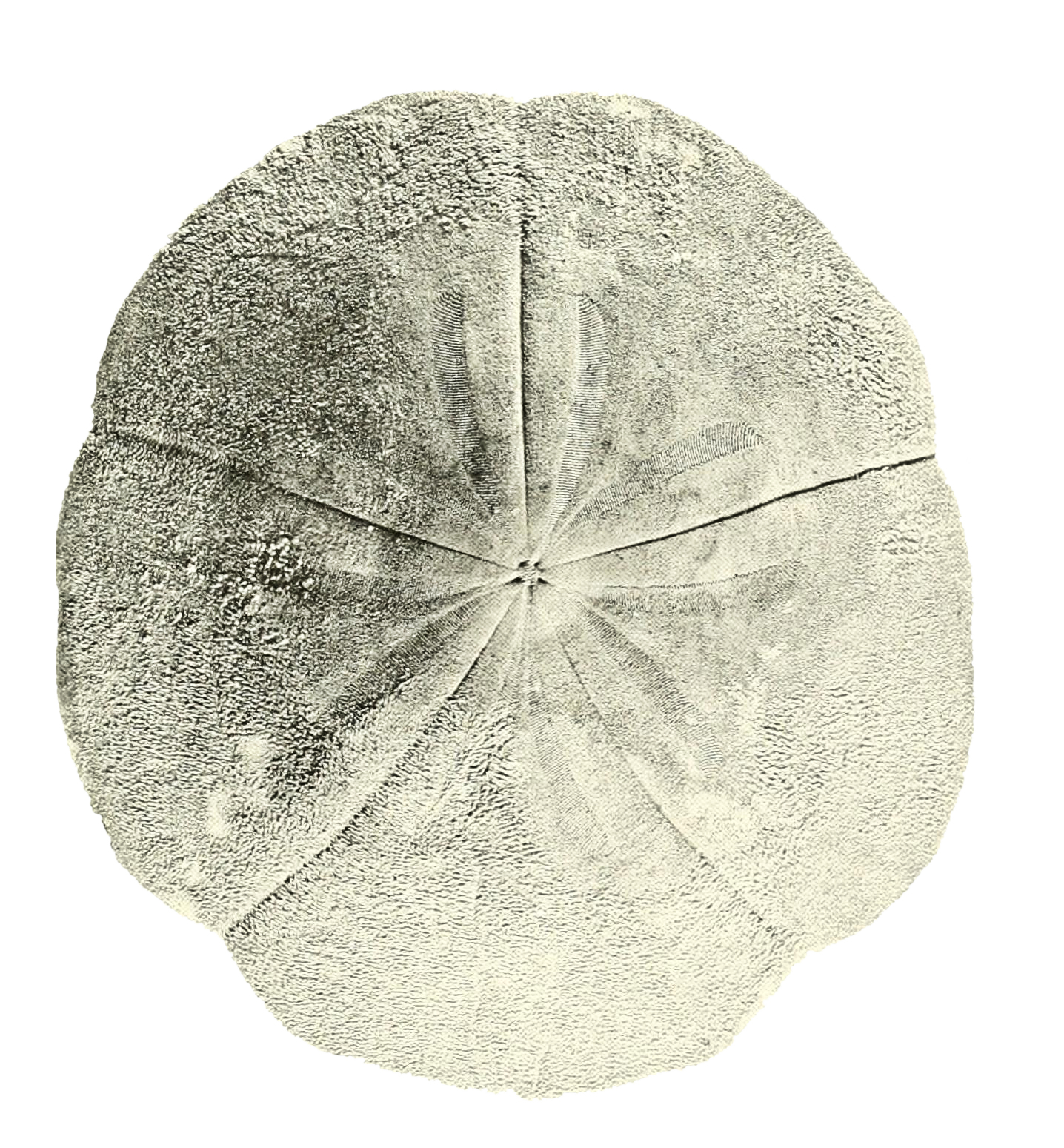

Scientific classification
- Domain: Eukaryota
- Kingdom: Animalia
- Phylum: Echinodermata
- Class: Echinoidea
- Order: Clypeasteroida
- Family: Clypeasteridae
- Genus: Ammotrophus
- Species: A. arachnoides

Binomial name
- Ammotrophus arachnoides (Clark, 1938)

= Ammotrophus arachnoides =

Species of sea urchin

Ammotrophus arachnoides is a species of sand dollar of the family Arachnoididea. Their external skeleton, known as a test, is covered with spines. It belongs to the genus Ammotrophus and lives in the sea off southern Australia. Ammotrophus arachnoides was first scientifically described in 1938 by Hubert Clark.
