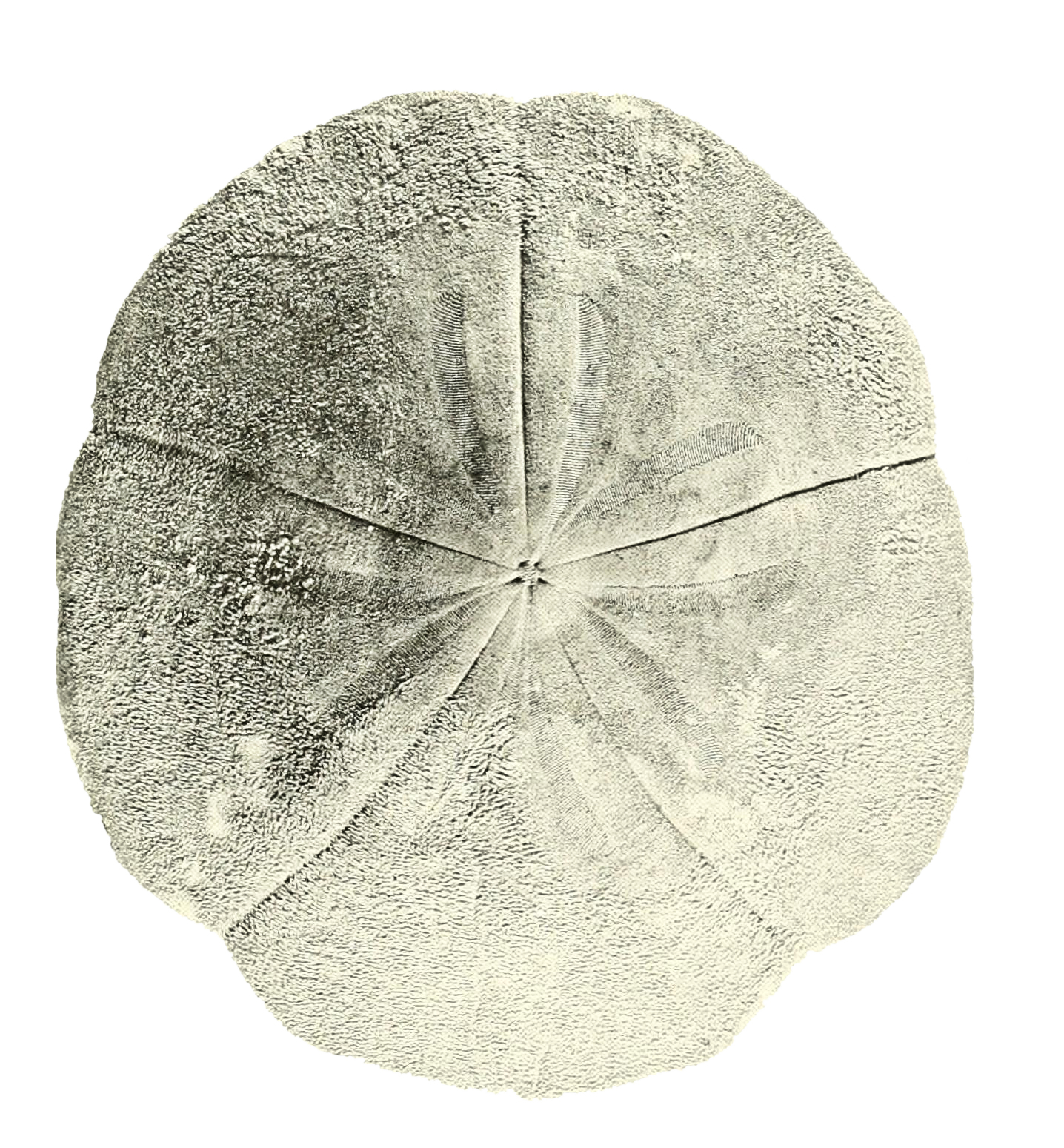
- Ammotrophus arachnoides

Scientific classification
- Kingdom: Animalia
- Phylum: Echinodermata
- Class: Echinoidea
- Order: Clypeasteroida
- Family: Clypeasteridae
- Genus: Ammotrophus; H.L. Clark, 1928

= Ammotrophus =

Genus of sea urchins

Ammotrophus is a genus of echinoderms belonging to the family Clypeasteridae.

The species of this genus are found in Australia.

Species:

- Ammotrophus arachnoides (H.L. Clark, 1938)
- Ammotrophus crassus (H.L. Clark, 1938)
- Ammotrophus cyclius H.L. Clark, 1928
- Ammotrophus platyterus H.L. Clark, 1928
