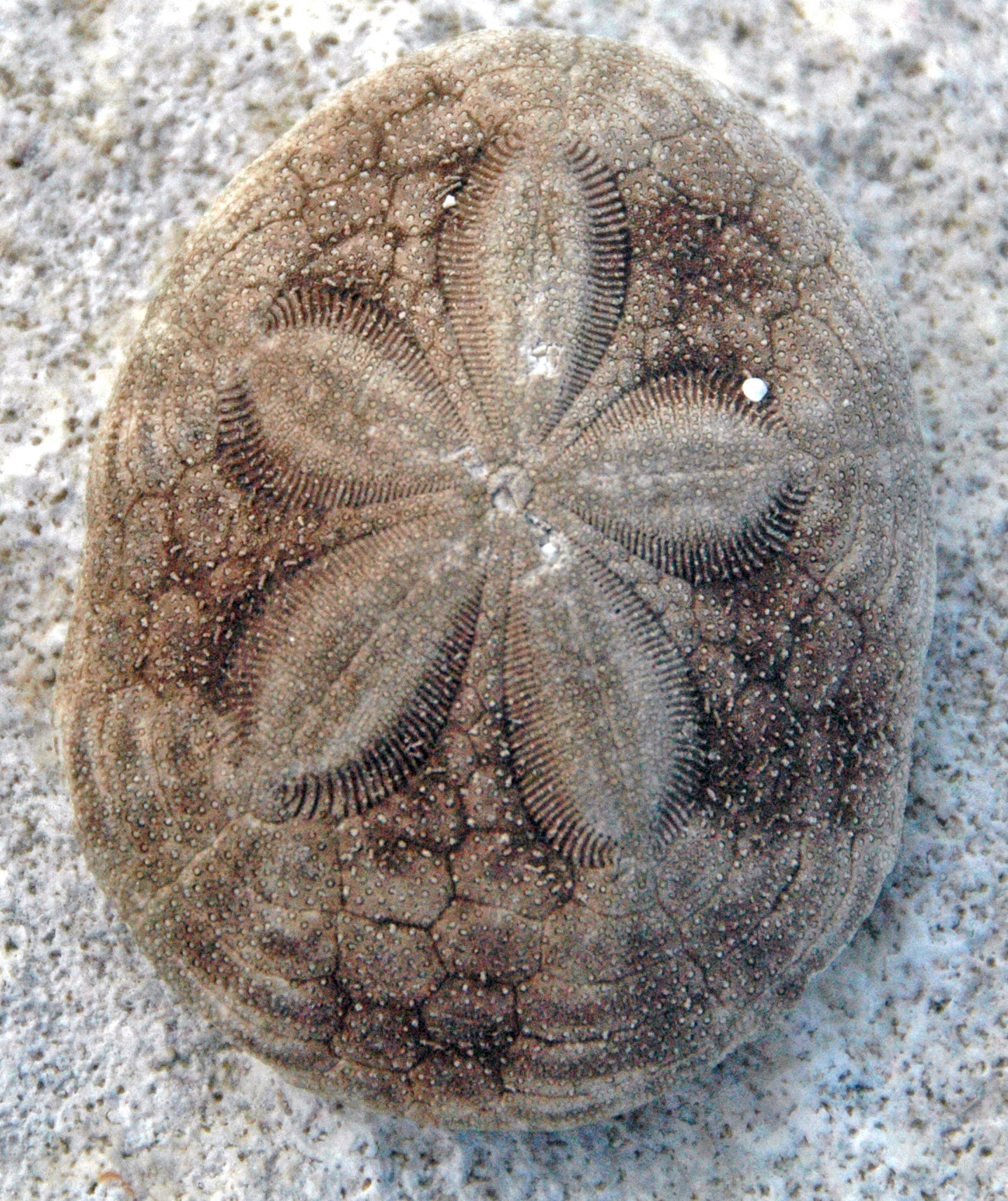
- Test from Bahamas

Conservation status
- Vulnerable (NatureServe)

Scientific classification
- Kingdom: Animalia
- Phylum: Echinodermata
- Class: Echinoidea
- Order: Clypeasteroida
- Family: Clypeasteridae
- Genus: Clypeaster
- Species: C. rosaceus

Binomial name
- Clypeaster rosaceus (Linnaeus, 1758)

Synonyms
- Diplothecanthus rosaceus (Linnaeus, 1758); Echinanthus rosaceus (Linnaeus, 1758); Echinus rosaceus Linnaeus, 1758

= Clypeaster rosaceus =

Species of sea urchin

Clypeaster rosaceus, the fat sea biscuit, is a species of sea urchin in the family Clypeasteridae. It occurs in shallow water in the western Atlantic Ocean and was first scientifically described in 1758 by Carl Linnaeus.

== Description ==
This is a very large sea biscuit with a strong inflated test, growing to a maximum length of around 200 mm (8 in). In shape it is ovate to slightly pentagonal, with the margin thicker at the anterior end. The petaloid area is broad, the anterior (front) petal being longer than the two posterior, paired petals, which are all of equal length; the area between the pores is wide and raised above the rest of the aboral (upper) surface. The oral (under) surface is fairly flat, with a deep depression around the mouth, and with deeply indented food grooves. The anus is on the oral surface near the posterior margin. The spines are short and coarse. When alive, this species is a dark brown colour, while the bare test is whitish.

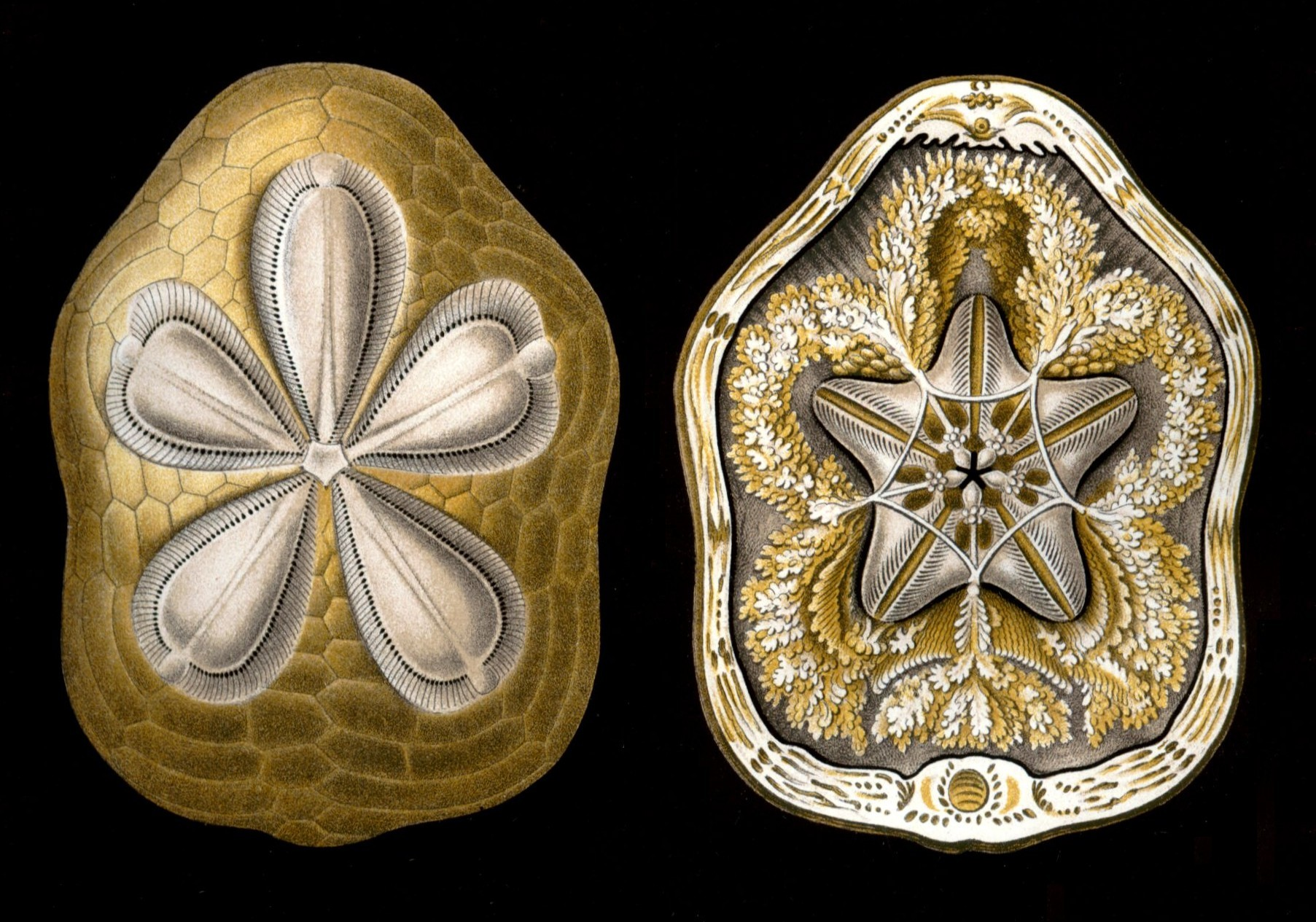
Aboral and internal views, by Ernst Haeckel in Kunstformen der Natur (1904)

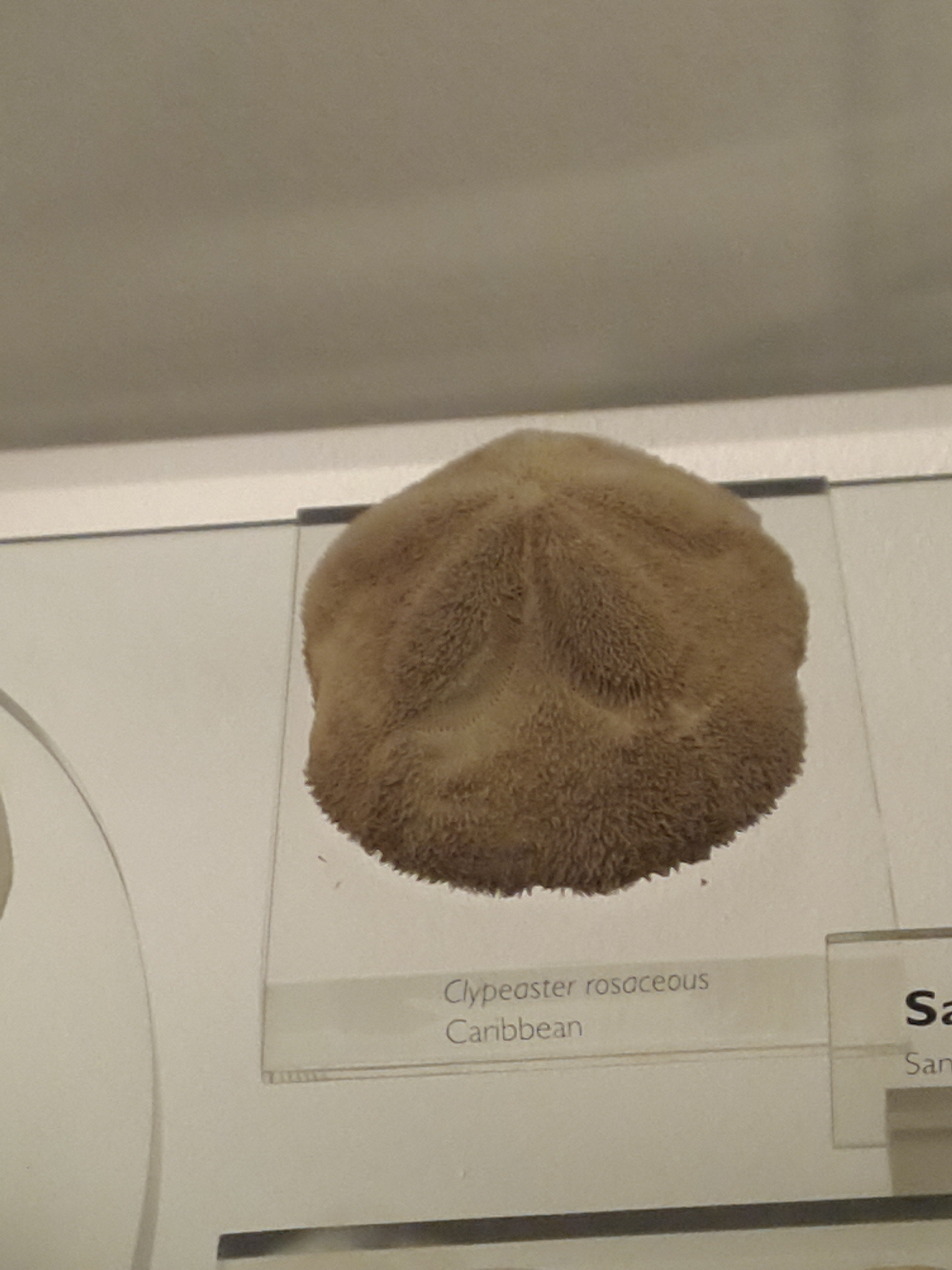
Preserved test in the Natural History Museum (London).

== Distribution and habitat ==
The species is found in the western Atlantic Ocean. Its range extends from South Carolina to the West Indies, Barbados, Texas and Venezuela. It is found on soft sandy bottoms, particularly in seagrass meadows, from the littoral zone down to about 50 m (160 ft).

== Ecology ==
C. rosaceus lives on the surface of sandy seabeds and is nocturnal. It feeds on fragments of dead plant material and algae particularly among seagrass plants. In the process of feeding it grinds up sand particles with its Aristotle's lantern mouthparts, and it has been estimated that it reduces 5.5 kg (12.1 lb) of coarse particles of sediment into fine particles in the course of a year. During the daytime it is inactive and buries itself or covers its test with fragments of shell and pieces of seagrass, holding these in place with its tube feet.

In Panama, breeding takes place annually in the rainy season, with spawn being liberated into the sea. The eggs contain much yolk to sustain the developing larvae, which settle on the seabed and undergo metamorphosis after about six days.
