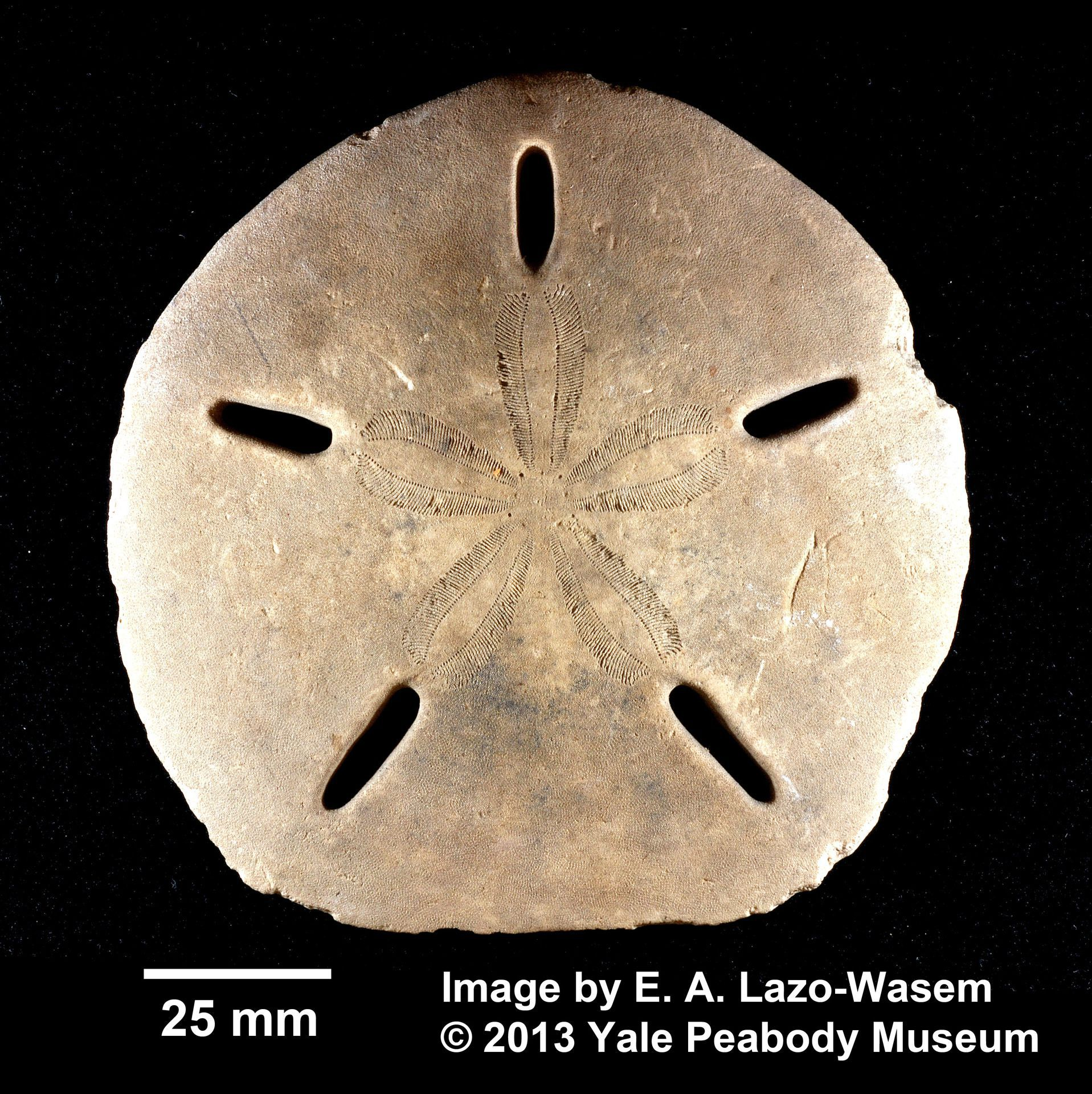

Scientific classification
- Kingdom: Animalia
- Phylum: Echinodermata
- Class: Echinoidea
- Order: Clypeasteroida
- Family: Astriclypeidae
- Genus: Astriclypeus; Verrill, 1867

= Astriclypeus =

Genus of sand dollars

Astriclypeus is a genus of echinoderms belonging to the family Astriclypeidae.

The species of this genus are found in Japan.

Species:

- Astriclypeus elegans Wang, 1986
- Astriclypeus mannii Verrill, 1867
- Astriclypeus miaoliensis Wang, 1986
- Astriclypeus pitouensis Wang, 1986
- Astriclypeus waiwulunemsis Wang, 1983
- Astriclypeus yeliuensis Wang, 1986
