= Clypeus (disambiguation) =

Clypeus may refer to:

- Clypeus (echinoderm), a fossil genus of echinoids
- Clypeus Grit, a stratum in the Jurassic Inferior Oolite named for the echinoid
- Clypeus (arthropod anatomy), a sclerite in an arthropod's exoskeleton
- Clypeus (fungal), an anatomical component in some fungi
