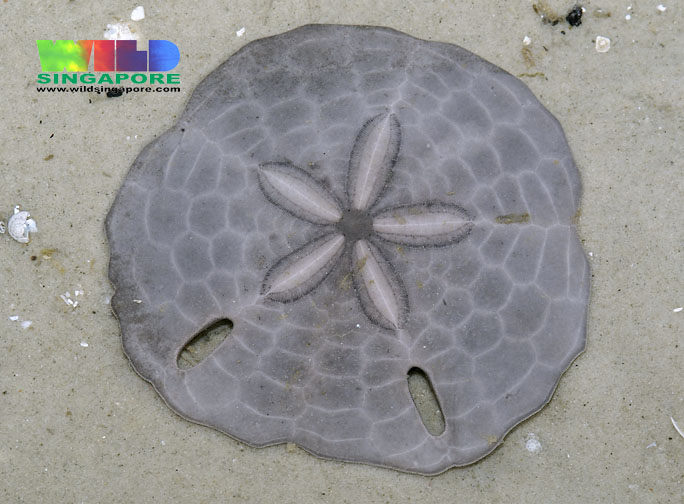
- Sculpsitechinus tenuissimus

Scientific classification
- Kingdom: Animalia
- Phylum: Echinodermata
- Class: Echinoidea
- Order: Clypeasteroida
- Family: Astriclypeidae
- Genus: Sculpsitechinus; Stara & Sanciu, 2014

= Sculpsitechinus =

Genus of sand dollars

Sculpsitechinus is a genus of sand dollars within the family Astriclypeidae. There are currently 3 species assigned to the genus, with members being found near Africa, Asia, and Australia in the Pacific and Indian Ocean.

== Species ==
- Sculpsitechinus auritus (Leske, 1778)
- Sculpsitechinus iraniensis Fatemi, Attaran-Fariman & Stara, 2016
- Sculpsitechinus tenuissimus (L. Agassiz & Desor, 1847)
