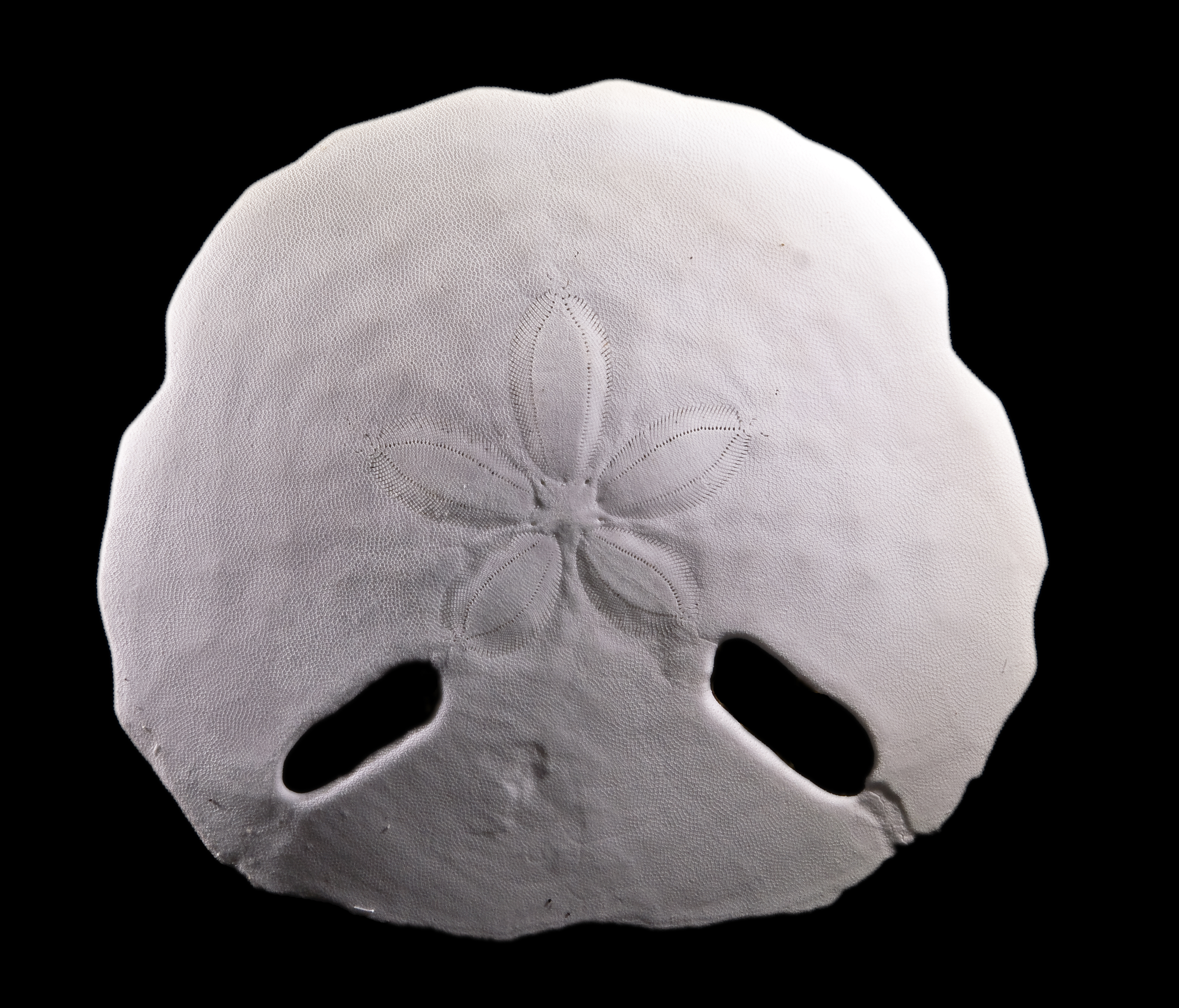

Scientific classification
- Kingdom: Animalia
- Phylum: Echinodermata
- Class: Echinoidea
- Order: Clypeasteroida
- Family: Astriclypeidae
- Genus: Echinodiscus
- Species: E. tenuissimus

Binomial name
- Echinodiscus tenuissimus (L. Agassiz & Desor, 1847)

= Echinodiscus tenuissimus =

Species of sea urchin

Echinodiscus tenuissimus is a species of sea urchin.
