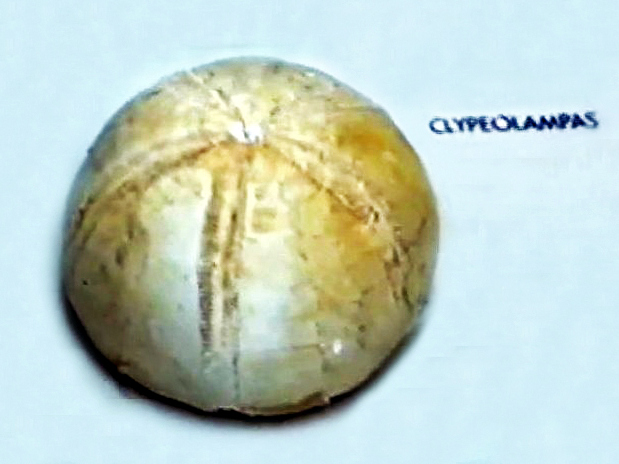
- Fossil of Clypeolampas on display at Museo Nacional de Ciencias Naturales

Scientific classification
- Kingdom: Animalia
- Phylum: Echinodermata
- Class: Echinoidea
- Family: †Clypeolampadidae
- Genus: †Clypeolampas; Pomel, 1869

= Clypeolampas =

Clypeolampas Temporal range: Cretaceous

Genus of sea urchins

Clypeolampas is a genus of sea urchins belonging to the family Clypeolampadidae.

== Fossil record ==
This genus is known from the Cretaceous in the fossil record of Spain and Turkey.

== Genera ==
Species within this genus include:

- Clypeolampas lestelli Cotteau 1887
- Clypeolampas ovatus Lamarck 1816
- Clypeolampas perovalis Arnaud 1877
