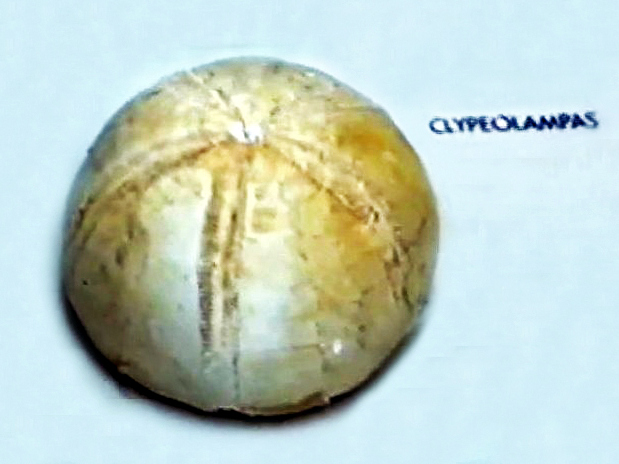
- Fossil of Clypeolampas on display at Museo Nacional de Ciencias Naturales

Scientific classification
- Kingdom: Animalia
- Phylum: Echinodermata
- Class: Echinoidea
- Superorder: Neognathostomata
- Family: †Clypeolampadidae; Kier, 1962

= Clypeolampadidae =

Clypeolampadidae Temporal range: Cretaceous

Family of sea urchins

Clypeolampadidae is a family of sea urchins belonging to the superorder Neognathostomata.

== Fossil record ==
This family is known in Cretaceous the fossil record of France, Oman, Spain and Turkey.

== Genera ==
Genera within this family include:

- Clypeolampas Pomel, 1869
- Hungaresia Szörényi, 1955
