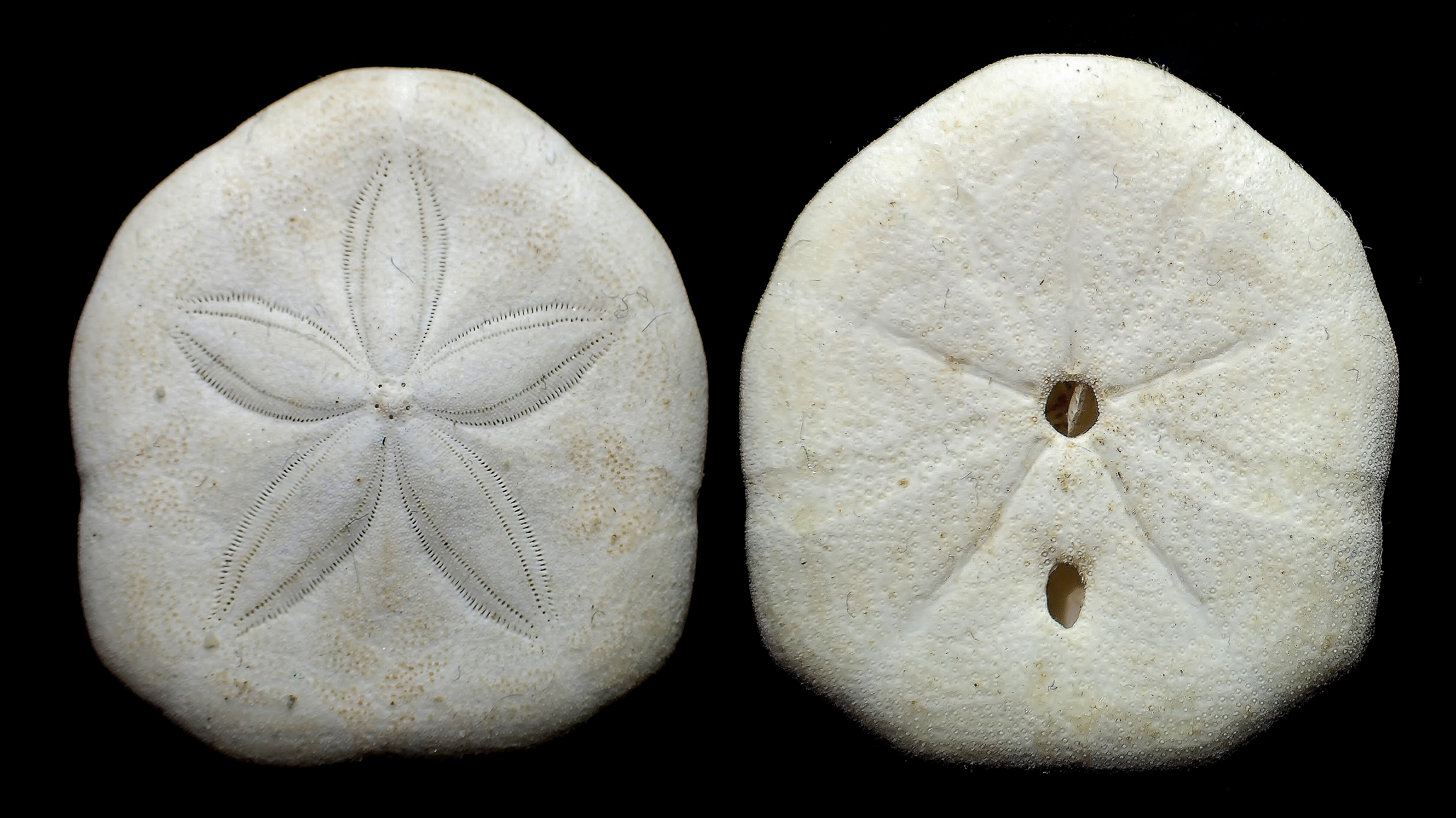
- Laganum laganum

Scientific classification
- Kingdom: Animalia
- Phylum: Echinodermata
- Class: Echinoidea
- Order: Clypeasteroida
- Family: Laganidae

= Laganidae =

Family of sand dollars

Laganidae is a family of echinoderms belonging to the order Clypeasteroida.

== Genera ==
Genera:

- genus Cenofibula Gasser, 1994 † -- 1 current species
- genus Hupea Pomel, 1883 -- 1 species
- genus Jacksonaster Lambert, in Lambert & Thiéry, 1914 -- 1 species
- genus Laganum Link, 1807 -- 9 species
- sous-famille Neolaganinae Durham, 1954 †
  - genus Cubanaster Sanchez Roig, 1952a † -- 6 species
  - genus Durhamella Kier, 1968a † -- 2 species
  - genus Neolaganum Durham, 1954 † -- 2 species
  - genus Pentedium Kier, 1967b † -- 1 species
  - genus Sanchezella Durham, 1954 † -- 1 species
  - genus Tetradiella Liao & Lin, 1981 † -- 1 species
  - genus Weisbordella Durham, 1954 † -- 3 species
  - genus Wythella Durham, 1954 † -- 2 species
- genus Peronella Gray, 1855 -- 17 species
- genus Rumphia Desor, 1857 -- 7 species
- genus Sismondia Desor, 1857 † -- 5 species
