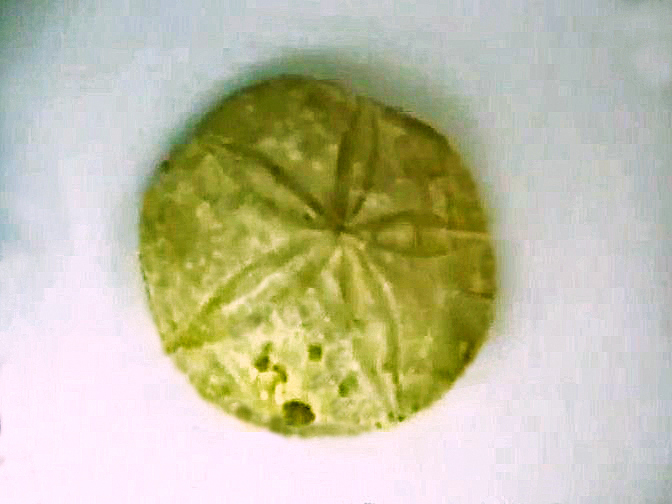
- Fossil of Pygurus tenuis on display at Senckenberg Museum

Scientific classification
- Kingdom: Animalia
- Phylum: Echinodermata
- Class: Echinoidea
- Superorder: Neognathostomata
- Family: †Clypeidae; Lambert, 1898

= Clypeidae =

Clypeidae Temporal range: Jurassic – Cretaceous

Family of sea urchins

Clypeidae is a family of sea urchins belonging to the superorder Neognathostomata.

== Fossil record ==
This family is known in the fossil record from the Jurassic (Bajocian age) to Cretaceous (Santonian age) (age range: from about 164.7 to 94.3 million years ago). Fossils of species within this genus have been found in Egypt, France, Portugal, Saudi Arabia, Switzerland, Ukraine, the United Arab Emirates, Chile, Ethiopia, Germany, India, Kenya, Madagascar, Poland, Saudi Arabia, Somalia, Tunisia, United Kingdom and United States.

== Genera ==
Genera within this family include:

- Astrolampas Pomel 1883
- Clypeus Leske 1778
- Colliclypeus Smith 1991
- Pseudopygurus
