= Faujasiidae =

Scientific classification
- Kingdom: Animalia
- Phylum: Echinodermata
- Class: Echinoidea
- Order: Clypeasteroida
- Family: Faujasiidae

Family of sand dollars

Faujasiidae is a family of echinoderms belonging to the order Clypeasteroida.

== Genera ==
Genera:

- Actapericulum Holmes, 1995
- †Australanthus Bittner, 1892
- Cardiopygus Aziz & Badve, 2001
