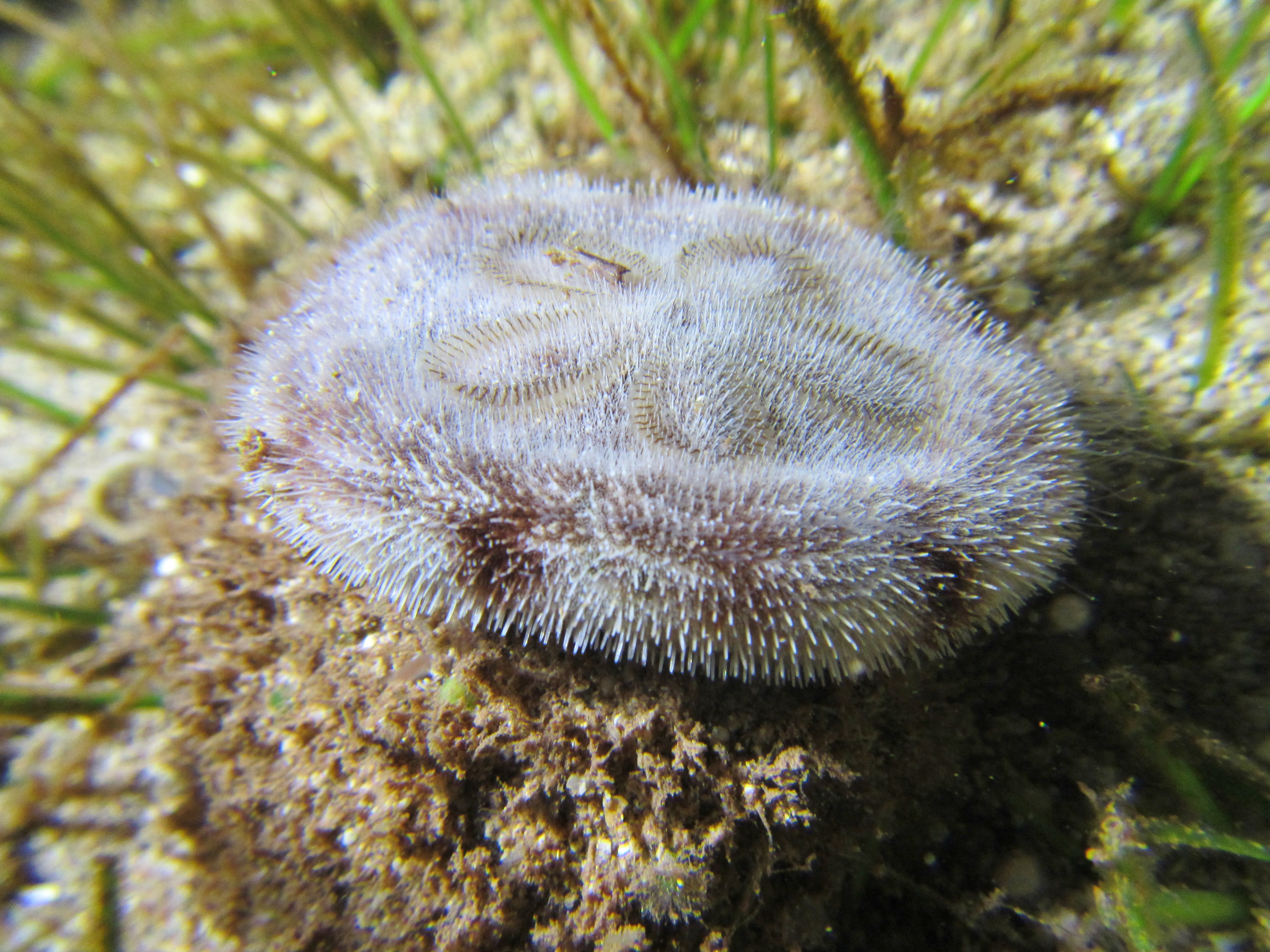
- Live specimen showing petaloid area

Scientific classification
- Kingdom: Animalia
- Phylum: Echinodermata
- Class: Echinoidea
- Order: Clypeasteroida
- Family: Clypeasteridae
- Genus: Clypeaster
- Species: C. reticulatus

Binomial name
- Clypeaster reticulatus (Linnaeus, 1758)

Synonyms
- Clypeaster scutiforme Lamarck, 1816; Clypeaster scutiformis Lamarck, 1816; Echinanthus coleae Gray, 1851; Echinanthus oblongus Gray, 1851; Echinodiscus reticulatus (Linnaeus, 1758); Echinus reticulatus Linnaeus, 1758; Lagana ovalis Blainville, 1834; Laganum scutiforme (Lamarck, 1816); Rhaphidoclypus reticulatus (Linnaeus, 1758); Scutella reticulatus (Linnaeus, 1758)

= Clypeaster reticulatus =

Species of sea urchin

Clypeaster reticulatus, the reticulated sea biscuit, is a species of sea urchin in the family Clypeasteridae. This species was first scientifically described in 1758 by Carl Linnaeus. It lives on the sandy seabed of shallow seas, semi-immersed in the sediment.

== Description ==
The reticulated sea biscuit can grow to a length of about 75 mm (3.0 in). Like all sea biscuits it has pentaradial symmetry and tends to be rather irregular in shape. It has a solid but slightly rounded aboral (upper) surface. The ambulacral areas on the aboral surface are characteristically shaped like petals and are at least two-thirds the width of the test. These are long and inflated, the front one being the longest and the foremost pair being the shortest. The oral (under) surface is concave or cup-shaped, with the food grooves being indistinct and only slightly indented. The anus is located on the underside near the margin at the back. Live specimens are yellowish-grey, often with darker markings, while bare tests are whitish. The tube feet emerge through widely spaced pairs of pores and are used in respiration. The pores and tubercles are not linearly arranged; they are irregularly scattered.

== Distribution and habitat ==
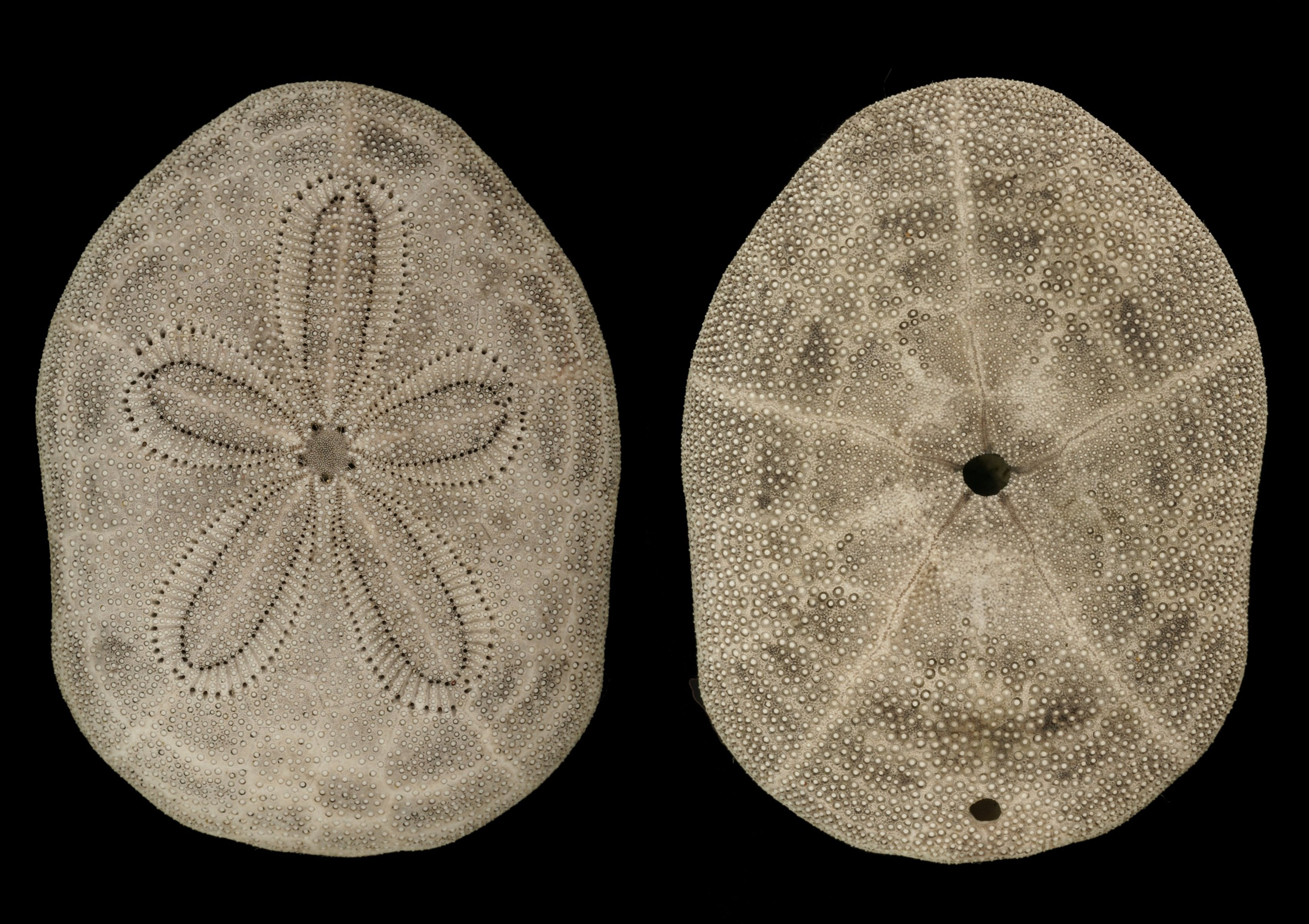
Upper and lower surfaces

This sea biscuit has a widespread distribution in the western Indo-Pacific region. Its range extends from the Red Sea to Hawaii and from Taiwan to New Caledonia, but it does not occur in Australia. It is found on sandy seabeds from the littoral zone down to about 125 m (400 ft).
