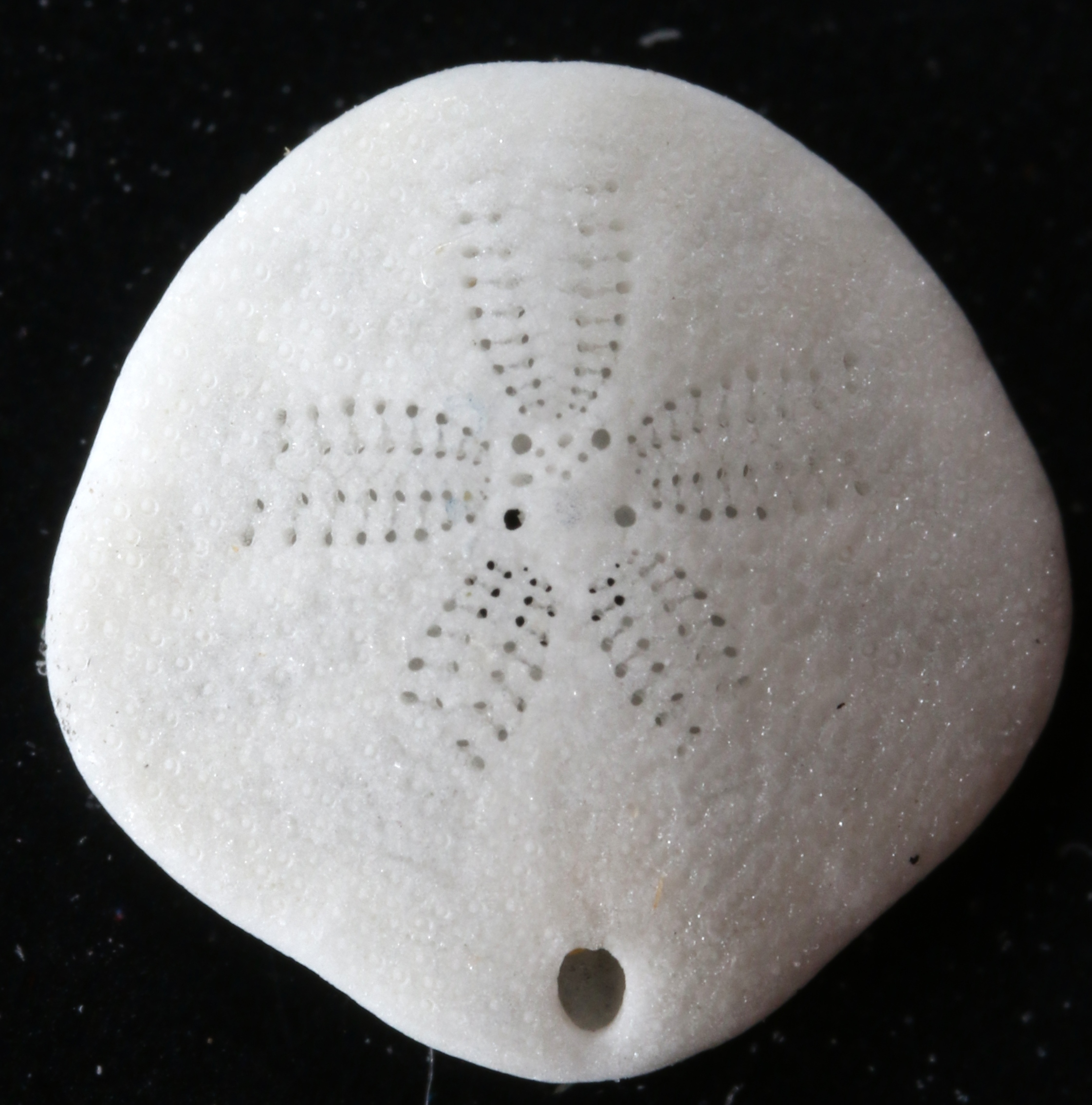
- Sinaechinocyamus mai

Scientific classification
- Kingdom: Animalia
- Phylum: Echinodermata
- Class: Echinoidea
- Order: Clypeasteroida
- Family: Taiwanasteridae

= Taiwanasteridae =

Family of sand dollars

Taiwanasteridae is a family of echinoderms belonging to the order Clypeasteroida.

Genera:

- Sinaechinocyamus Liao, 1979
- Taiwanaster Wang, 1984
