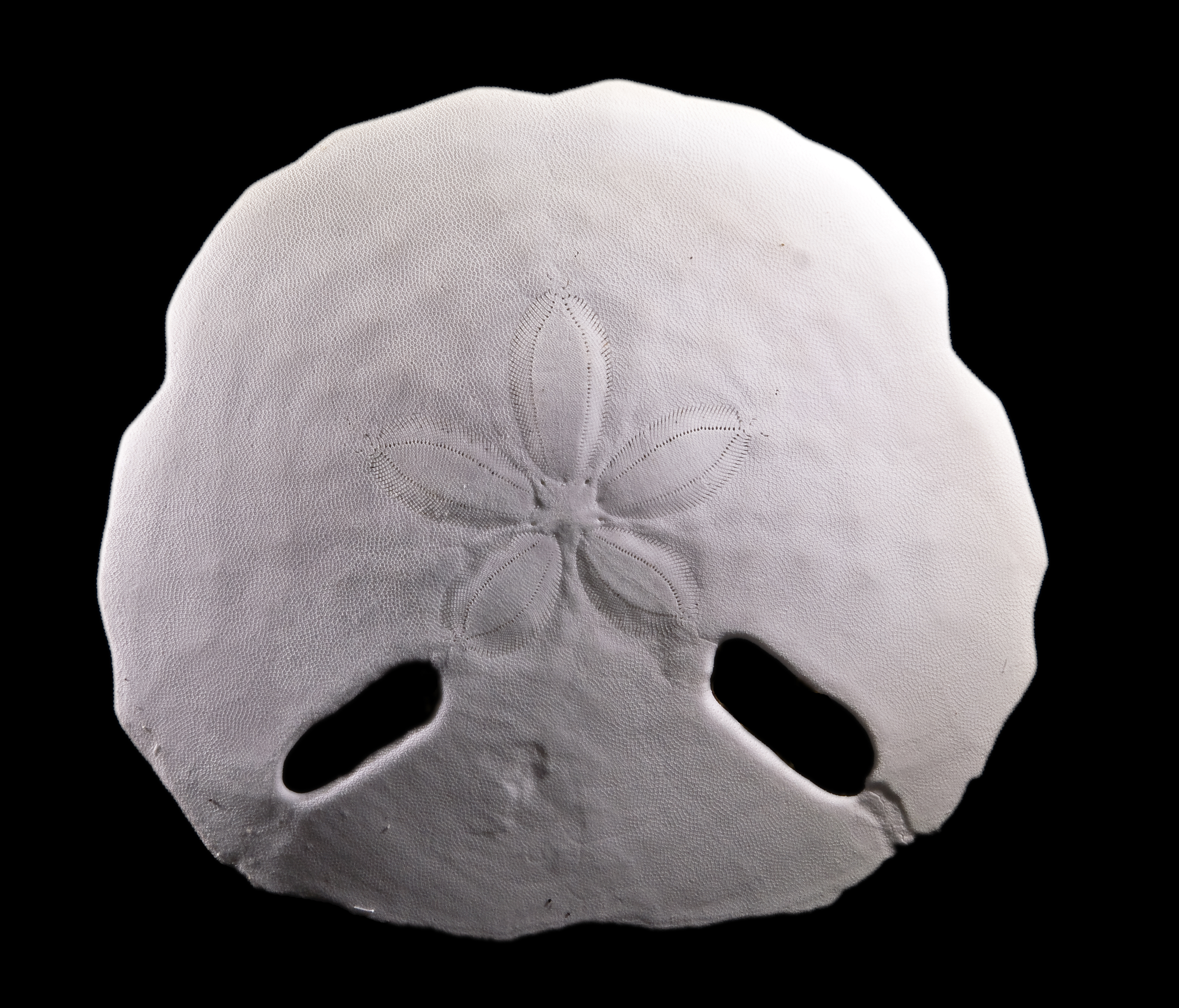
- Echinodiscus tenuissimus (dorsal view); a species within the family

Scientific classification
- Kingdom: Animalia
- Phylum: Echinodermata
- Class: Echinoidea
- Order: Clypeasteroida
- Suborder: Scutellina
- Family: Astriclypeidae

= Astriclypeidae =

Family of sand dollars

Astriclypeidae is a family of echinoderms belonging to the order Clypeasteroida.

Genera:

- Amphiope L. Agassiz, 1840
- Astriclypeus Verrill, 1867
- Echinodiscus Leske, 1778
- Kieria Mihály, 1985
- Paraamphiope Stara & Sanciu, 2014
- Sculpsitechinus Stara & Sanciu, 2014
- Tretodiscus
