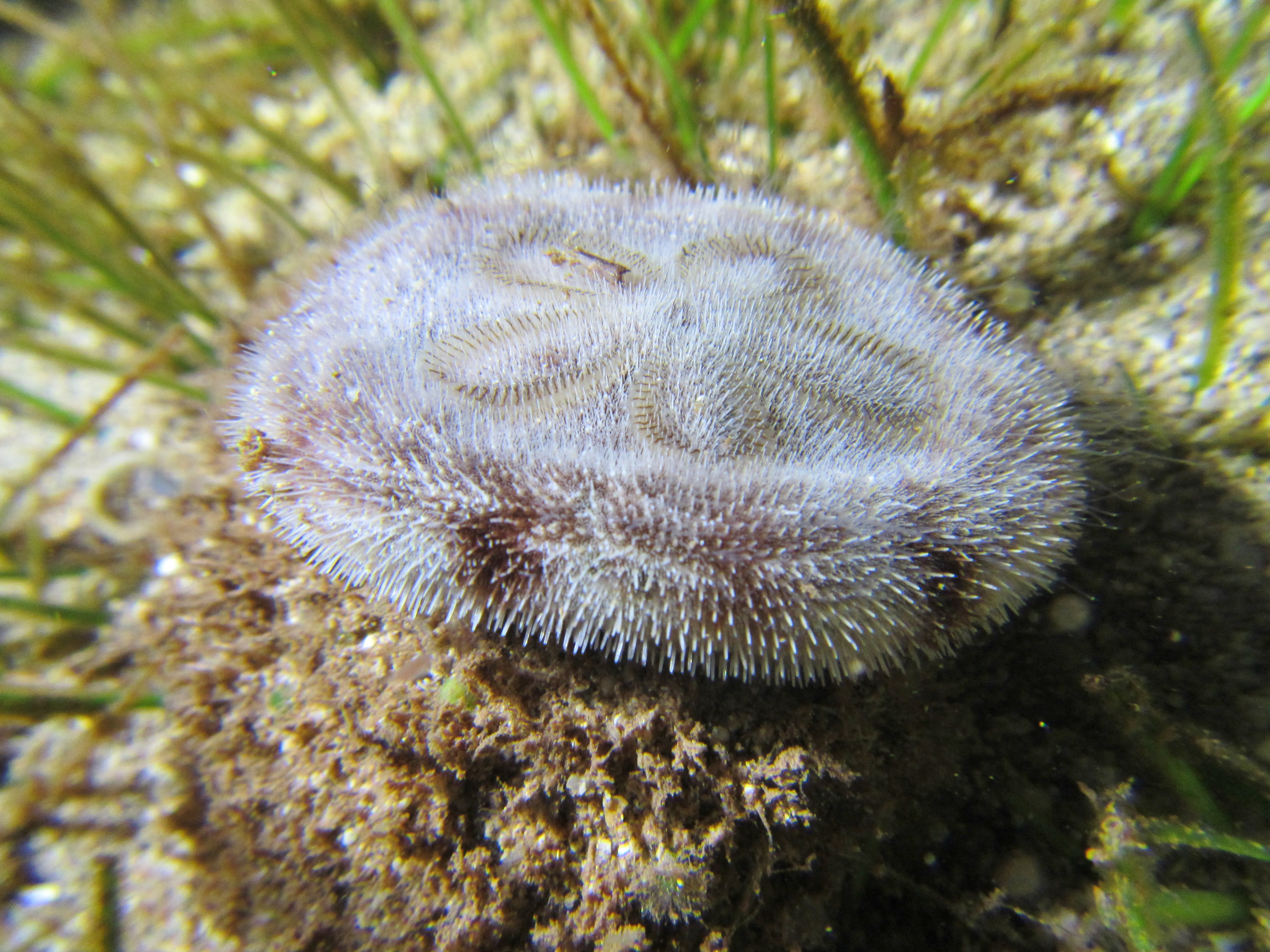
- Clypeaster reticulatus

Scientific classification
- Kingdom: Animalia
- Phylum: Echinodermata
- Class: Echinoidea
- Order: Clypeasteroida
- Family: Clypeasteridae; L. Agassiz, 1835

Genera
- See text

= Clypeasteridae =

Family of sea urchins

Clypeasteridae is a family of sea urchins in the order Clypeasteroida. This family was first scientifically described in 1835 by the Swiss-American biologist Louis Agassiz.

The clypeasteridae also known as the sand dollar, are round and semi-flat organisms with spines lining the underside of the body and elongated genital papillae aiding its survival and reproduction. The spines help them move along the sea floor to feed and increase in density to burrow the sediment while avoiding predators. The elongated genital papillae allow the sand dollar to asexually reproduce undisrupted under the sediment as the gametes are released into the water and later fertilized by male clypeasteridae.

== Genera ==
The World Register of Marine Species list the following genera as being in this family:-

- Ammotrophus H.L. Clark, 1928
- Arachnoides Leske, 1778
- Clypeaster Lamarck, 1801
- Fellaster Durham, 1955
- †Monostychia Laube, 1869
