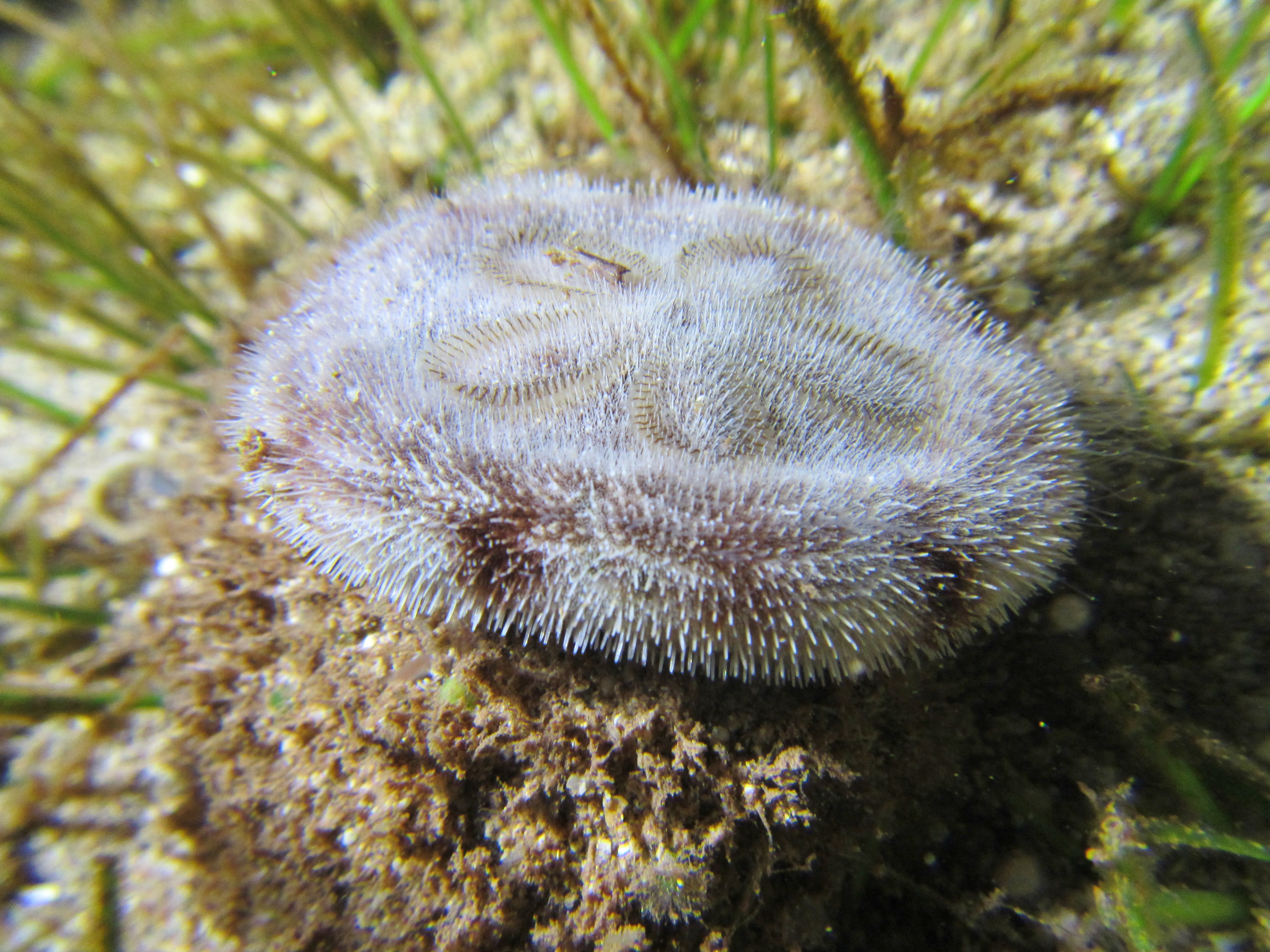
- A live individual of Clypeaster reticulatus (Mayotte)

Scientific classification
- Kingdom: Animalia
- Phylum: Echinodermata
- Class: Echinoidea
- Superorder: Neognathostomata
- Order: Clypeasteroida

Suborders and families
- See text

= Sand dollar =

Sand dollars Temporal range: 56–0 Ma Late Paleocene to Recent

Order of sea urchins

Sand dollars (also known as sea cookies or snapper biscuits in New Zealand, or pansy shells in South Africa, and sometimes as sand urchins) are species of flat, burrowing sea urchins belonging to the order Clypeasteroida.

== Names ==
The term "sand dollar" derives from the appearance of the tests (skeletons) of dead individuals after being washed ashore. The test lacks its velvet-like skin of spines and has often been bleached white by sunlight. To beachcombers of the past, this suggested a large, silver coin, such as the old Spanish dollar, which had a diameter of 38–40 mm.

Other names for the sand dollar include sand cakes, pansy shells, snapper biscuits, cake urchins, and sea cookies. In South Africa, they are known as pansy shells from their suggestion of a five-petaled garden flower. The inflated sea biscuit or Caribbean sand dollar, Clypeaster rosaceus, is thicker in height than most. In Spanish-speaking areas of the Americas, the sand dollar is most often known as galleta de mar ("sea cookie"); the translated term is often encountered in English.

== Description ==
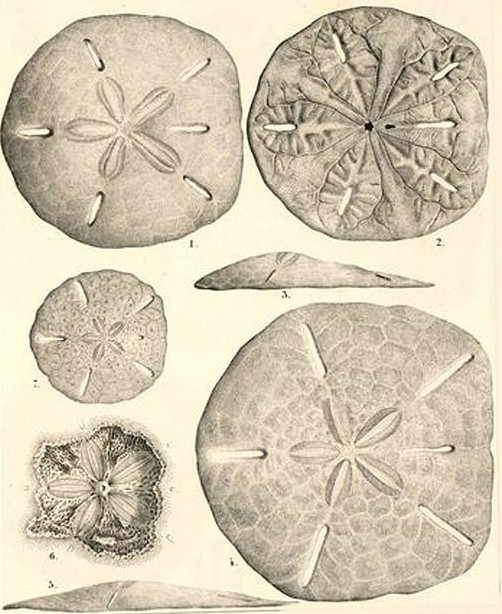
Leodia sexiesperforata by Louis Agassiz (1841)

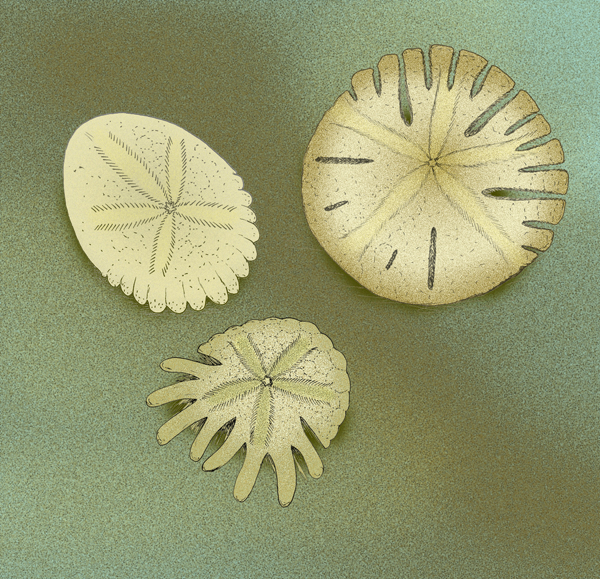
Examples of Rotulidae

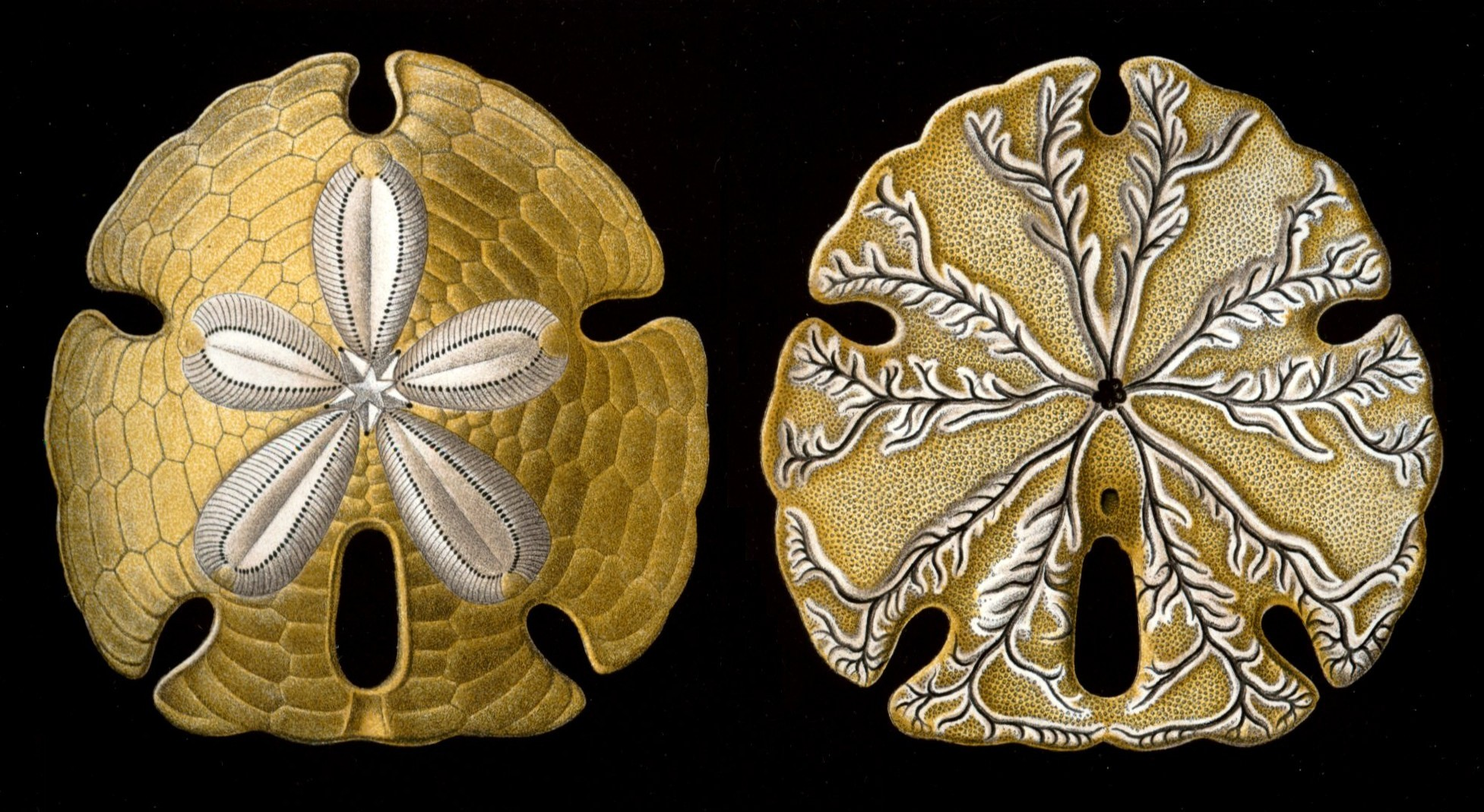
Encope emarginata (aboral and oral faces) by Ernst Haeckel (1904)

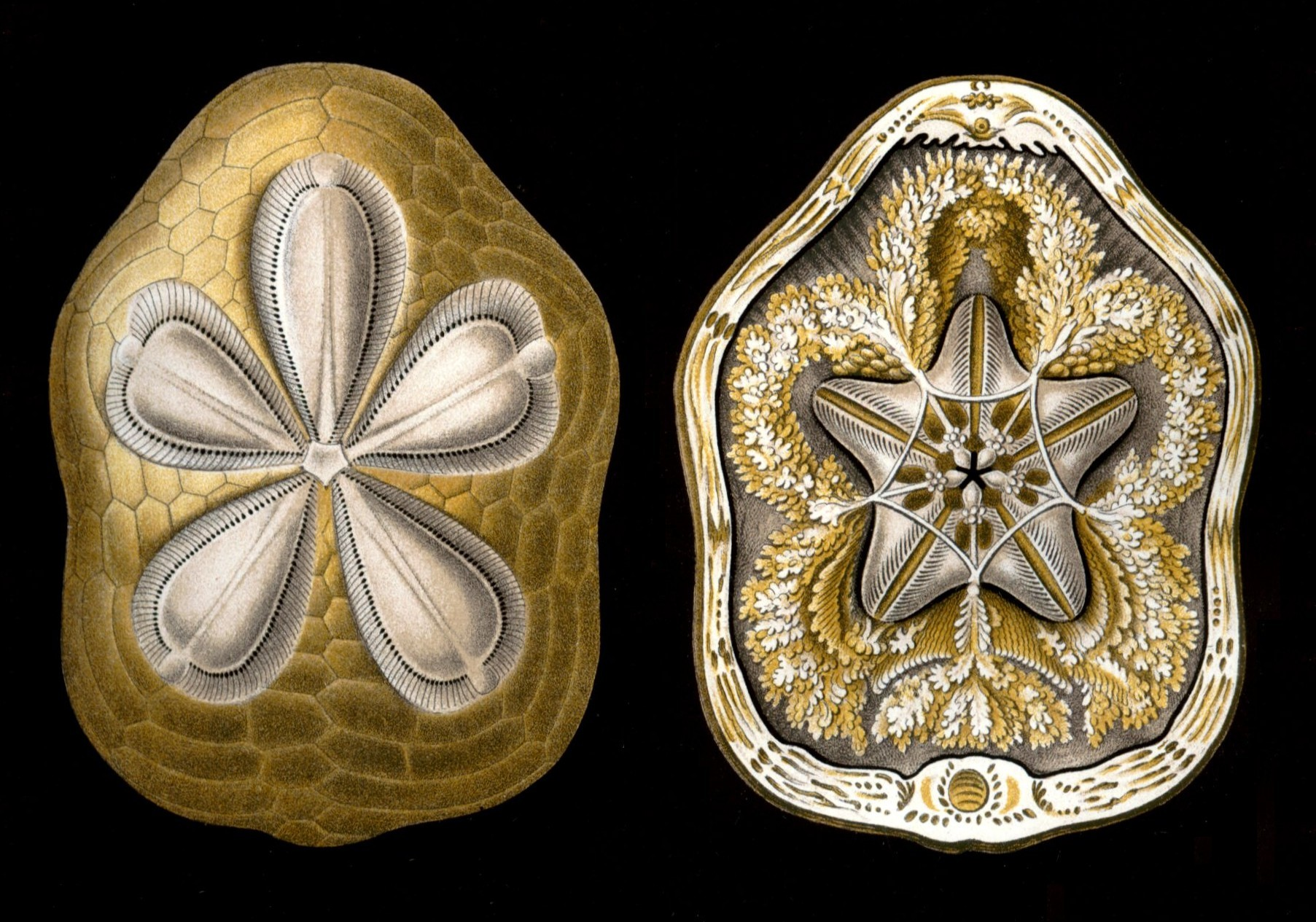
Clypeaster rosaceus (aboral and oral faces) by Ernst Haeckel (1904)

Sand dollars diverged from the other irregular echinoids, namely the cassiduloids, during the early Jurassic, with the first true sand dollar genus, Togocyamus, arising during the Paleocene. Soon after Togocyamus, more modern-looking groups emerged during the Eocene.

Sand dollars are small in size, averaging from 80 to 100 mm (3 to 4 inches). As with all members of the order Clypeasteroida, they possess a rigid skeleton called a test. The test consists of calcium carbonate plates arranged in a fivefold symmetric pattern. The tests of certain species of sand dollar have slits called lunules that can help the animal stay embedded in the sand to stop it from being swept away by an ocean wave. In living individuals, the test is covered by a skin of velvet-textured spines which are covered with very small hairs (cilia). Coordinated movements of the spines enable sand dollars to move across the seabed. The velvety spines of live sand dollars appear in a variety of colors—green, blue, violet, or purple—depending on the species. Individuals which are very recently dead or dying (moribund) are sometimes found on beaches with much of the external morphology still intact. Dead individuals are commonly found with their empty test devoid of all surface material and bleached white by sunlight.

The bodies of adult sand dollars, like those of other echinoids, display radial symmetry. The petal-like pattern in sand dollars consists of five paired rows of pores. The pores are perforations in the endoskeleton through which podia for gas exchange project from the body. The mouth of the sand dollar is located on the bottom of its body at the center of the petal-like pattern. Unlike other urchins, the bodies of sand dollars also display secondary front-to-back bilateral symmetry with no morphological distinguishing features between males and females. The anus of sand dollars is located at the back rather than at the top as in most urchins, with many more bilateral features appearing in some species. These result from the adaptation of sand dollars, in the course of their evolution, from creatures that originally lived their lives on top of the seabed (epibenthos) to creatures that burrow beneath it (endobenthos).

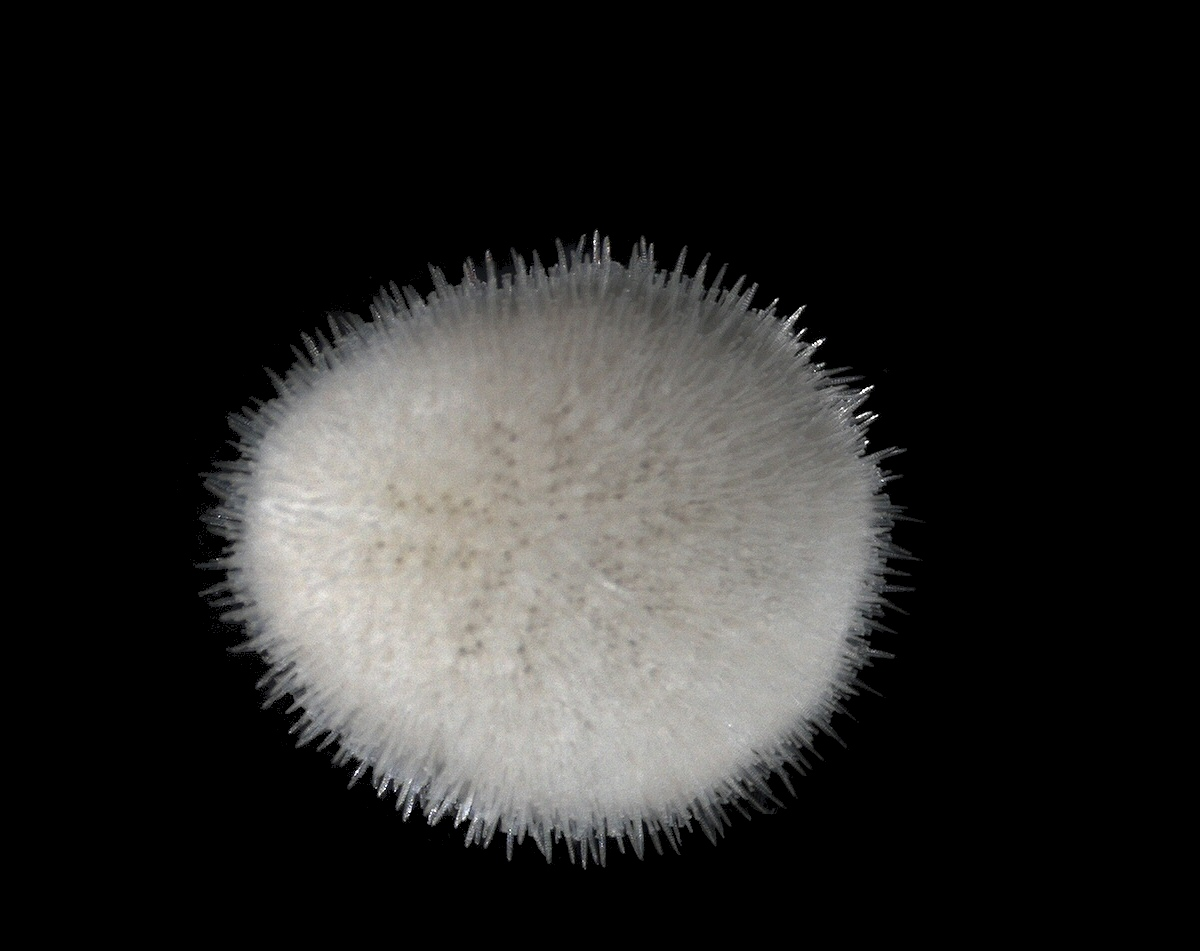
Echinocyamus pusillus alive.

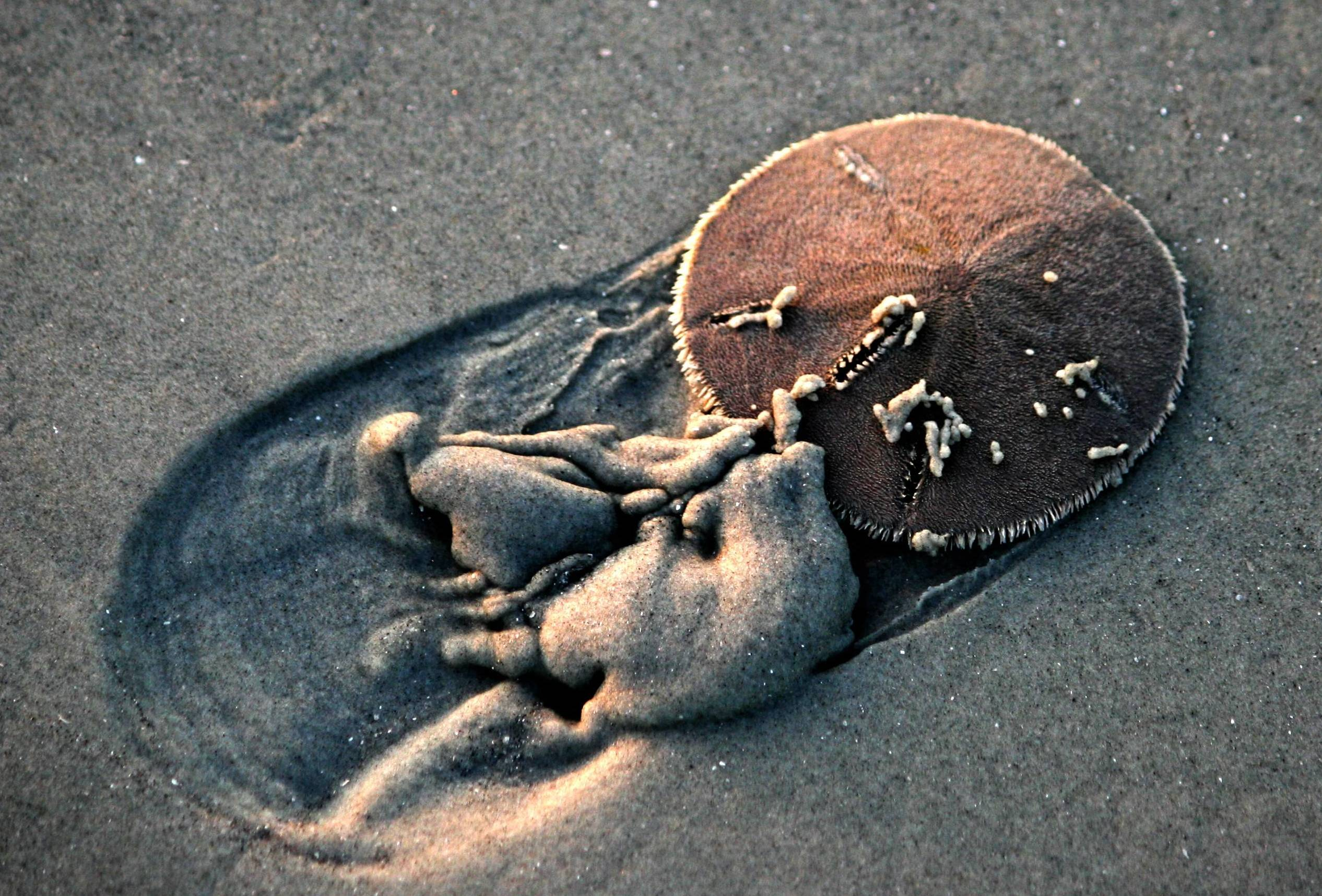
Living sand dollar.

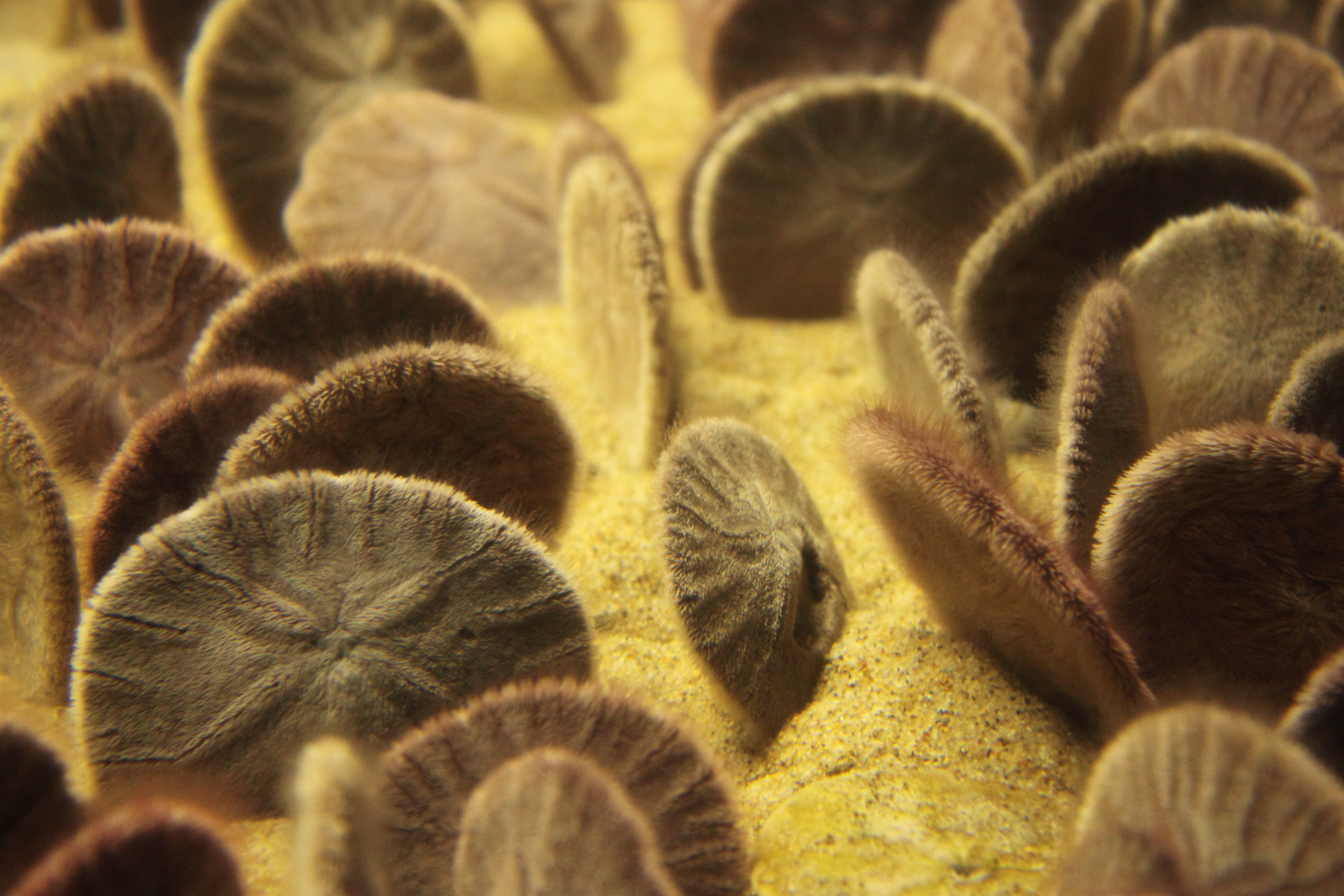
Eccentric sand dollars (Dendraster excentricus) at Monterey Bay Aquarium.

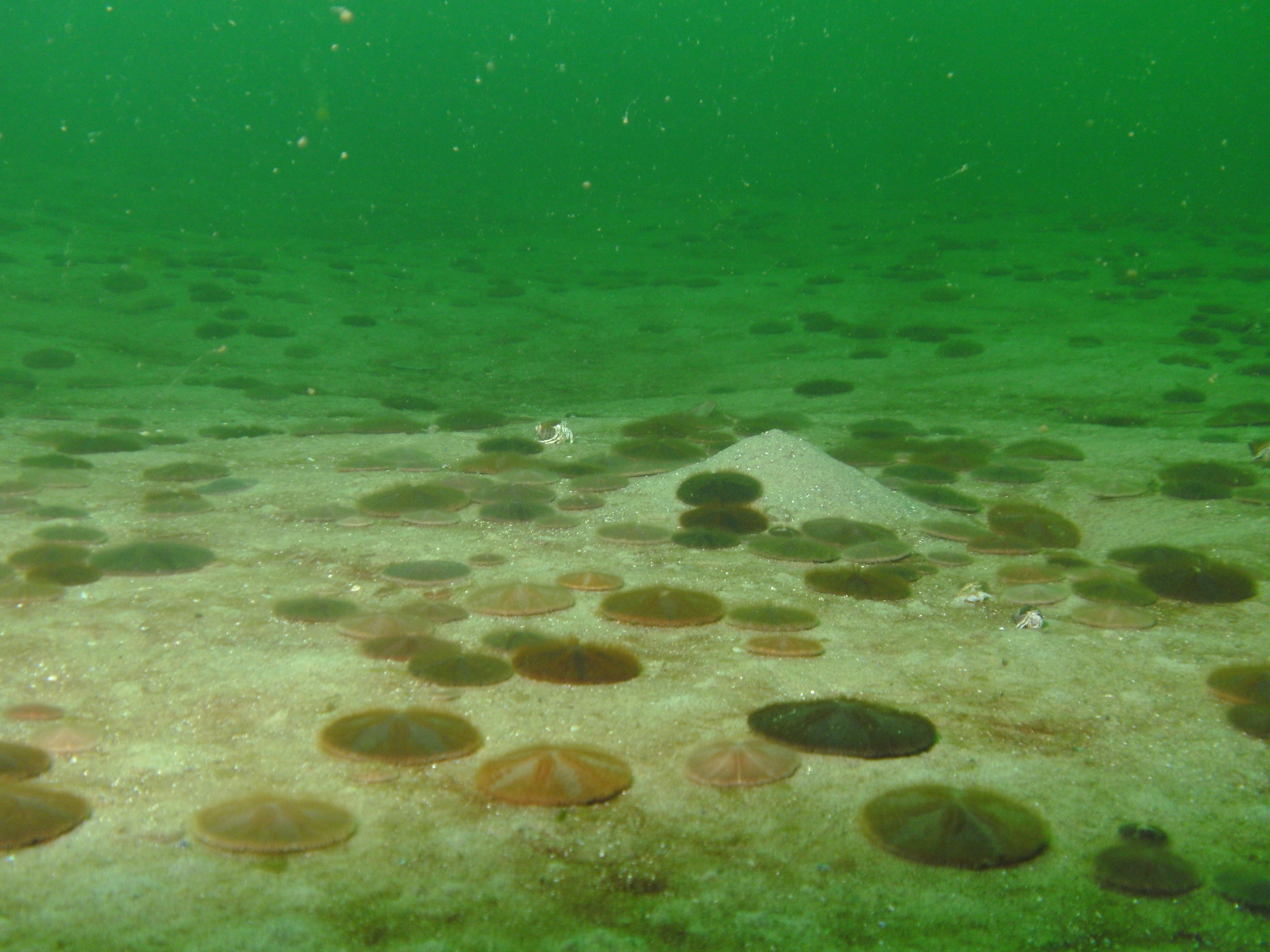
Echinarachnius parma (family Echinarachniidae).

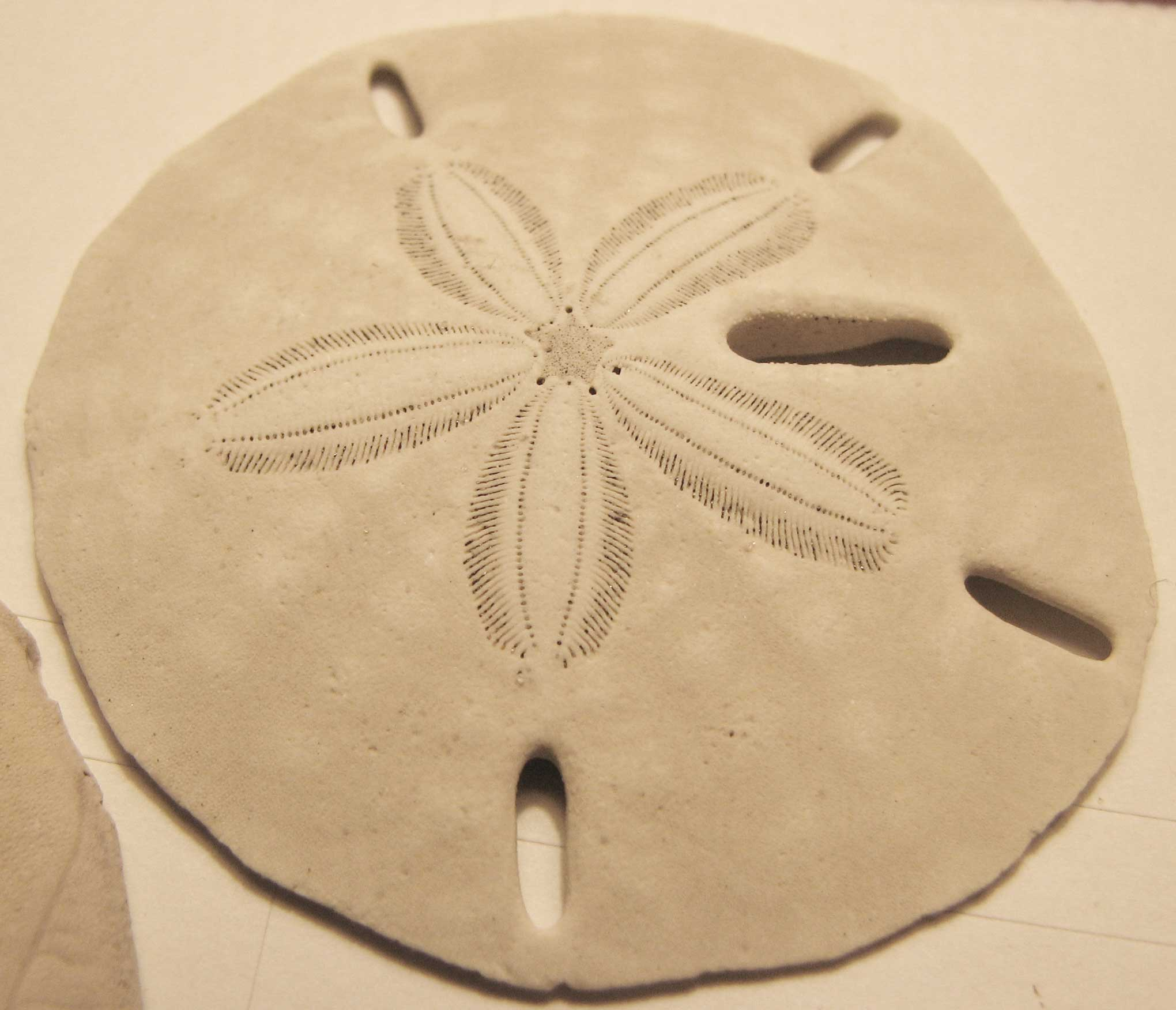
Mellita quinquiesperforata test (Clypeasteridae)

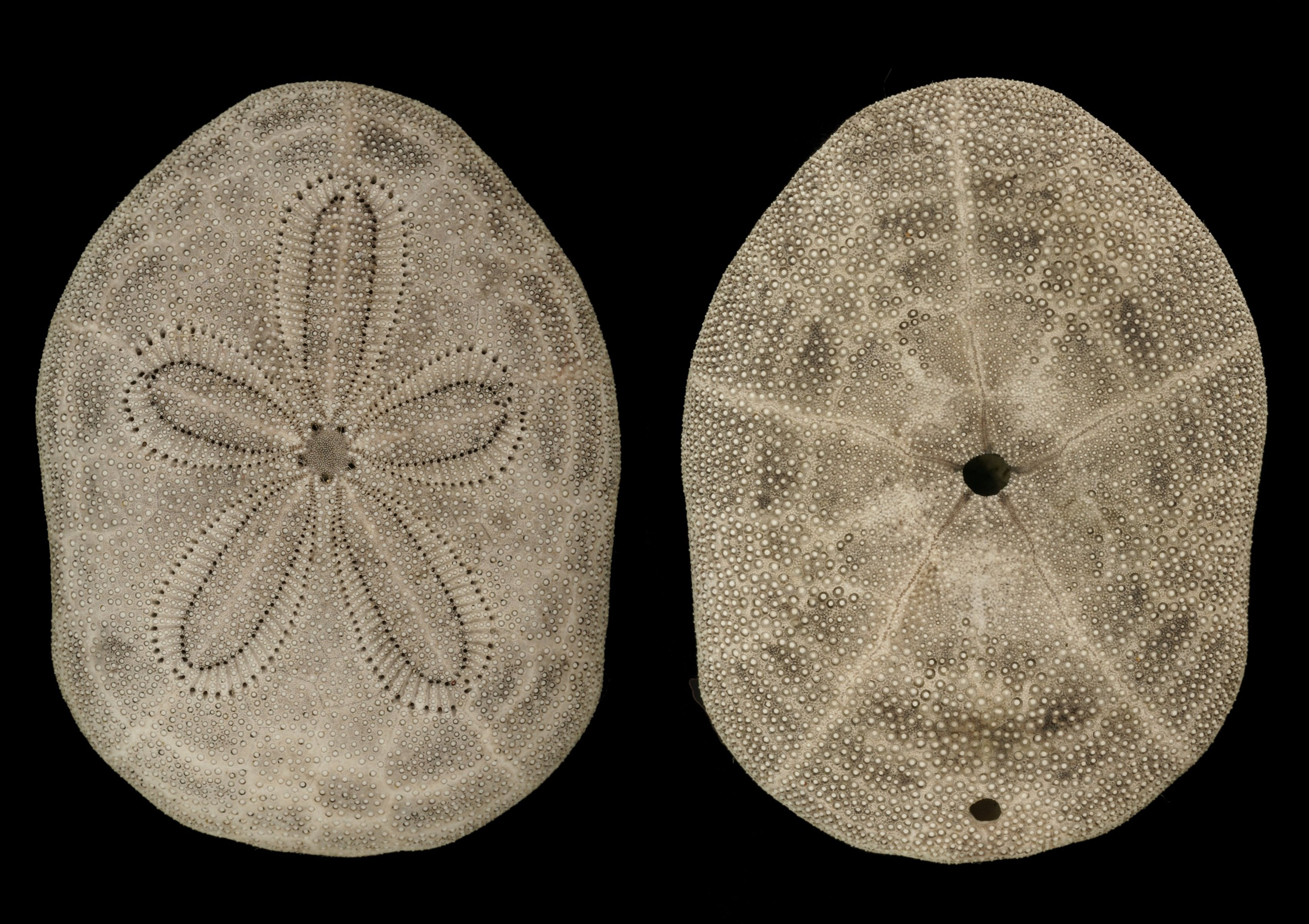
Clypeaster reticulatus test (Clypeasteridae)

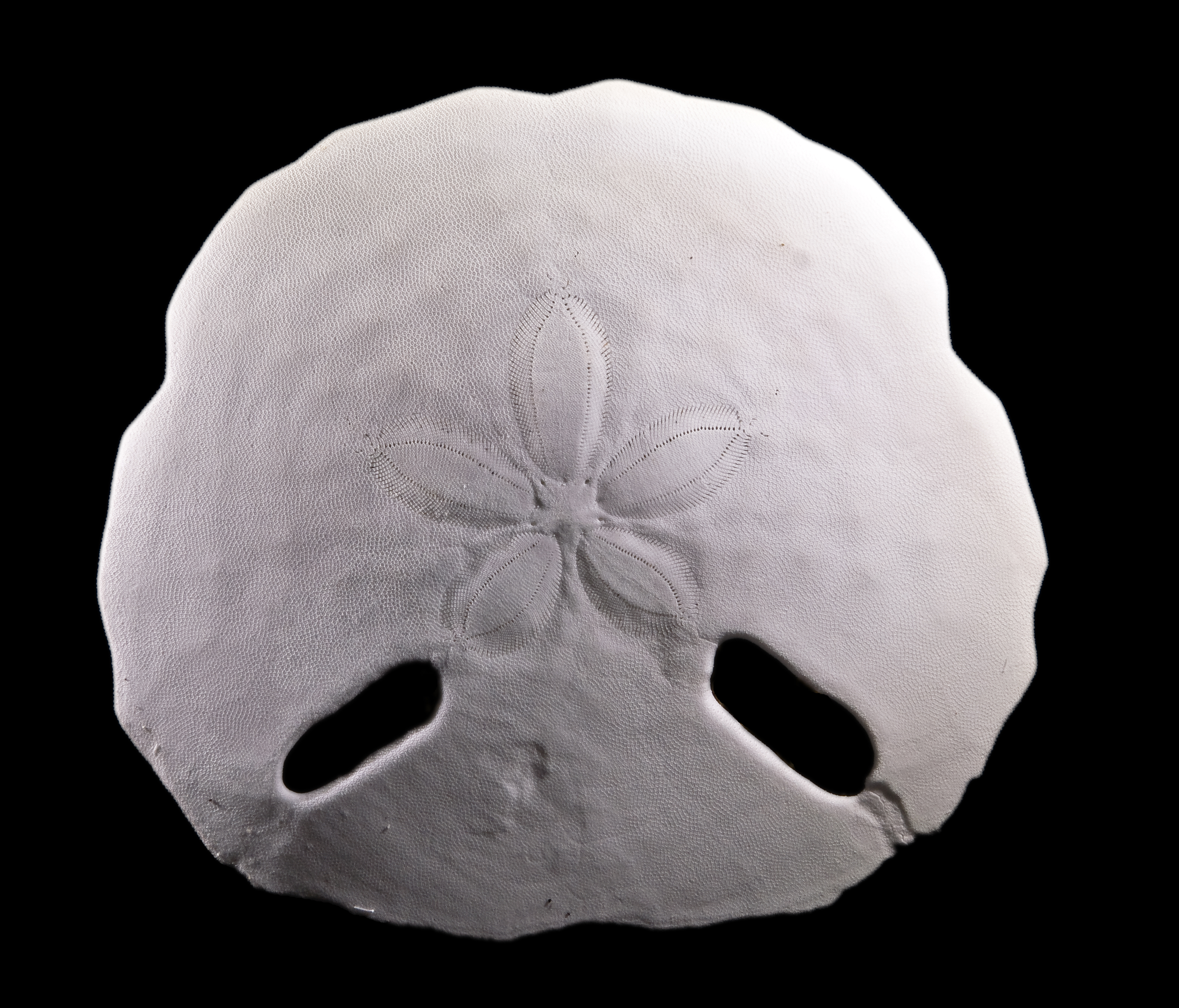
Sculpsitechinus tenuissimus test (Astriclypeidae)

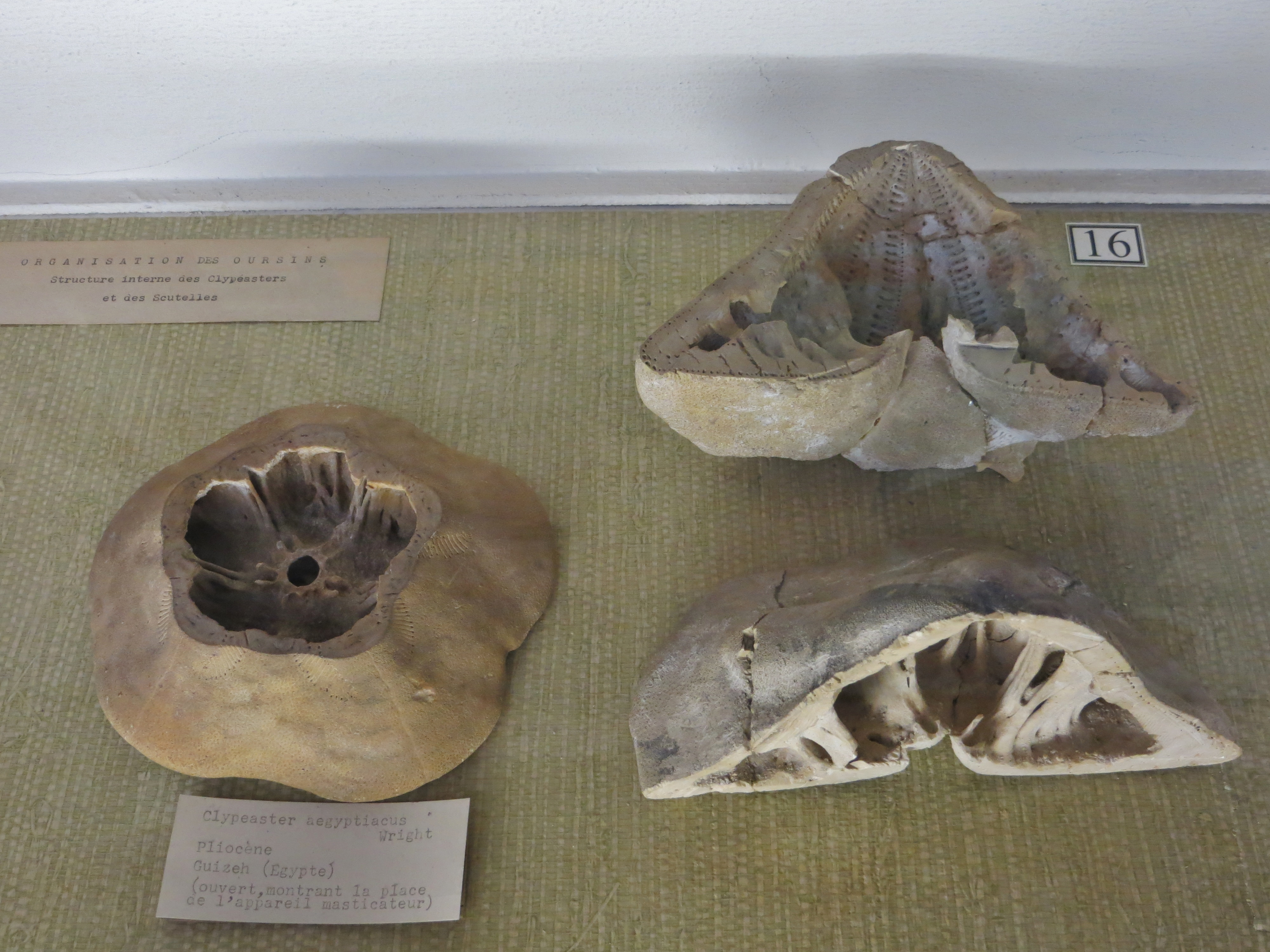
Clypeaster aegypticus, showing internal buttresses

== Taxonomy ==
Clypeasteroida as traditionally defined includes various families divided into two suborders: Clypeasterina and Scutellina.

According to World Register of Marine Species:

- suborder Clypeasterina
  - family Clypeasteridae L. Agassiz, 1835
  - family Fossulasteridae Philip & Foster, 1971 †
  - family Scutellinoididae Irwin, 1995 †
- family Conoclypeidae von Zittel, 1879 †
- family Faujasiidae Lambert, 1905 †
- family Oligopygidae Duncan, 1889 †
- family Plesiolampadidae Lambert, 1905 †
- suborder Scutellina
  - infraorder Laganiformes
    - family Echinocyamidae Lambert & Thiéry, 1914
    - family Fibulariidae Gray, 1855
    - family Laganidae Desor, 1858
  - infraorder Scutelliformes
    - family Echinarachniidae Lambert in Lambert & Thiéry, 1914
    - family Eoscutellidae Durham, 1955 †
    - family Protoscutellidae Durham, 1955 †
    - family Rotulidae Gray, 1855
  - superfamily Scutelloidea Gray, 1825
      - family Abertellidae Durham, 1955 †
      - family Astriclypeidae Stefanini, 1912
      - family Dendrasteridae Lambert, 1900 -- Pacific eccentric sand dollar.
      - family Mellitidae Stefanini, 1912 -- Keyhole sand dollars
      - family Monophorasteridae Lahille, 1896 †
      - family Scutasteridae Durham, 1955 †
      - family Scutellidae Gray, 1825
    - family Taiwanasteridae Wang, 1984
  - family Scutellinidae Pomel, 1888a †

However, the traditional Clypeasteroida is currently not thought to represent a monophyletic group because the Clypeasterina and Scutellina are most likely not each other's closest relatives. Their similarities are possibly the result of convergent evolution. They are part of clade Luminacea, which also includes the orders Cassiduloida and Echinolampadoida. In a recent classification, Clypeasteroida includes only the former Clypeasterina.

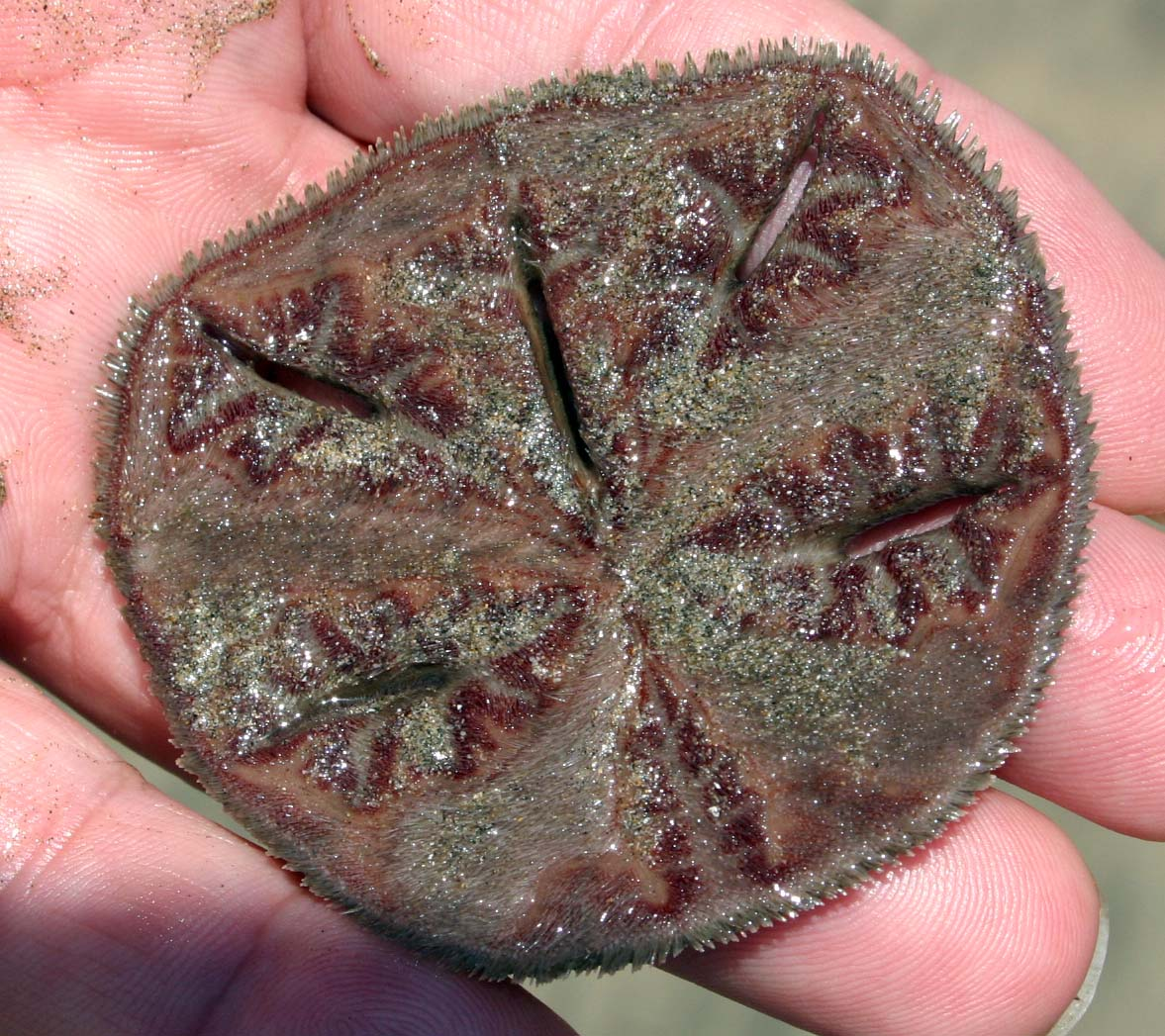
Underside of live Mellita quinquiesperforata

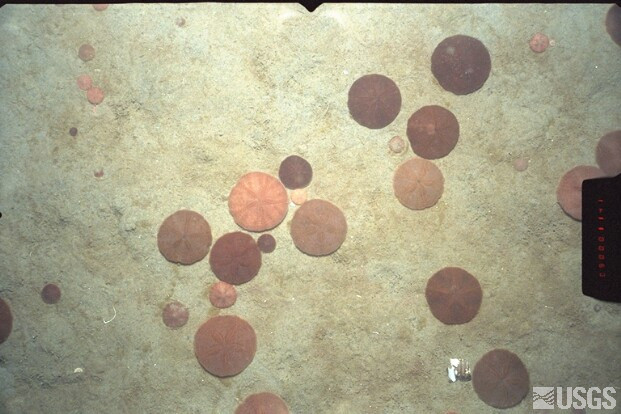
A number of sand dollars on the seabed

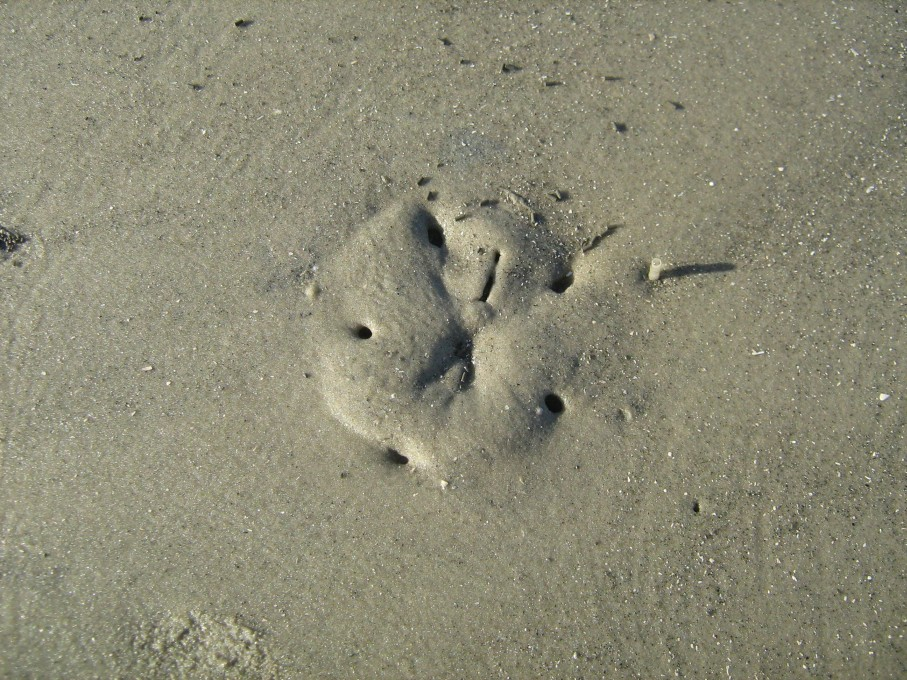
Sand dollar beneath the sand at low tide on Hilton Head Island

Live sea biscuit, Clypeaster rosaceus, commonly found off Key Biscayne, Florida

== Behavior and habitat ==
A sand dollar digging into the sand on the Playa Novillero beach at low tide on the Pacific coast of Mexico

Spines on the underside of a sand dollar on the beach at Hilton Head Island, South Carolina

Sand dollars can be found in temperate and tropical zones along all continents. Sand dollars live in waters below the mean low tide line, on or just beneath the surface of sandy and muddy areas. The common sand dollar, Echinarachnius parma, can be found in the Northern Hemisphere from the intertidal zone to the depths of the ocean, while the keyhole sand dollars (three species of the genus Mellita) can be found on many a wide range of coasts in and around the Caribbean Sea.

The spines on the somewhat flattened topside and underside of the animal allow it to burrow or creep through the sediment when looking for shelter or food. Fine, hair-like cilia cover these tiny spines. Sand dollars usually eat algae and organic matter found along the ocean floor, though some species will tip on their side to catch organic matter floating in ocean currents.

Sand dollars frequently gather on the ocean floor, in part to their preference for soft bottom areas, which are convenient for their reproduction. The sexes are separate and, as with most echinoids, gametes are released into the water column and go through external fertilization. The nektonic larvae metamorphose through several stages before the skeleton or test begins to form, at which point they become benthic.

In 2008, biologists discovered that sand dollar larvae will clone themselves for a few different reasons. When a predator is near, certain species of sand dollar larvae will split themselves in half in a process they use to asexually clone themselves when sensing danger. The cloning process can take up to 24 hours and creates larvae that are 2/3 their original length which can help conceal them from the predator. The larvae of these sand dollars clone themselves when they sense dissolved mucus from a predatory fish. The larvae exposed to this mucus from the predatory fish respond to the threat by cloning themselves. This process doubles their population and halves their size which allows them to better escape detection by the predatory fish but may make them more vulnerable to attacks from smaller predators like crustaceans. Sand dollars will also clone themselves during normal asexual reproduction. Larvae will undergo this process when food is plentiful or temperature conditions are optimal. Cloning may also occur to make use of the tissues that are normally lost during metamorphosis.

The flattened test of the sand dollar allows it to burrow into the sand and remain hidden from sight from potential predators. Predators of the sand dollar are the fish species cod, flounder, sheepshead and haddock. These fish will prey on sand dollars even through their tough exterior.

Sand dollars have spines on their bodies that help them to move around the ocean floor. When a sand dollar dies, it loses the spines and becomes smooth as the endoskeleton is then exposed.

During the month of August, the sand dollar will have had its highest gonad index, and in November and December is the time when sand dollars will spawn. Broadcast spawning is how sand dollars reproduce.

For animals like the sand dollar (an echinoderm) their main mode of reproduction is broadcast spawning. An adult sand dollar's sex cannot be determined directly by just looking at it. The only way to determine the sex of the animal is by the color of its gamete exudate. The gamete exudate is the fluid released into the water during the spawning of sand dollars. Yellow exudate will contain eggs and white exudate will contain sperm.

By completing reproduction through spawning, sand dollars will reproduce in groups which increases the chances of fertilization. Male sand dollars start spawning by releasing sperm through the accessory papillae or the gonopores. After roughly 10 minutes, spawning stops, and the sand dollar will cover itself with sand. After the male spawns, the sperm enters the female's egg, beginning fertilization.

After roughly 80 minutes of fertilization, cell division will begin to occur, also known as cleavage. After cleavage, the cells become blastulae and then gastrula. During the gastrula stage, the embryo's height decreases and the width slightly increases. After the gastrula stage, the larvae will begin the pluteus stage. At this point in a sand dollar's early stages of life, it will want to feed but cannot. The sand dollar larvae will have mouths that are able to open but cannot eat.

Along with wanting to feed, the larvae will have three identifiable body parts: an esophagus, stomach, and intestine. Though at the beginning of the pluteus stage, the larvae cannot feed, it will feed towards the end of the stage just before metamorphosis. The larvae will push out the forming juvenile sand dollar and begin metamorphosis. For sand dollars, this stage takes about an hour and thirty minutes for the larval tissues to regress. Since the larval tissues are in regress, the sand dollar will then start to undergo resorption of these tissues. After metamorphosis, the sand dollar will start to become a juvenile, developing a skeleton, teeth, and will begin to be able to feed themselves.
