= List of echinoderms of Venezuela =

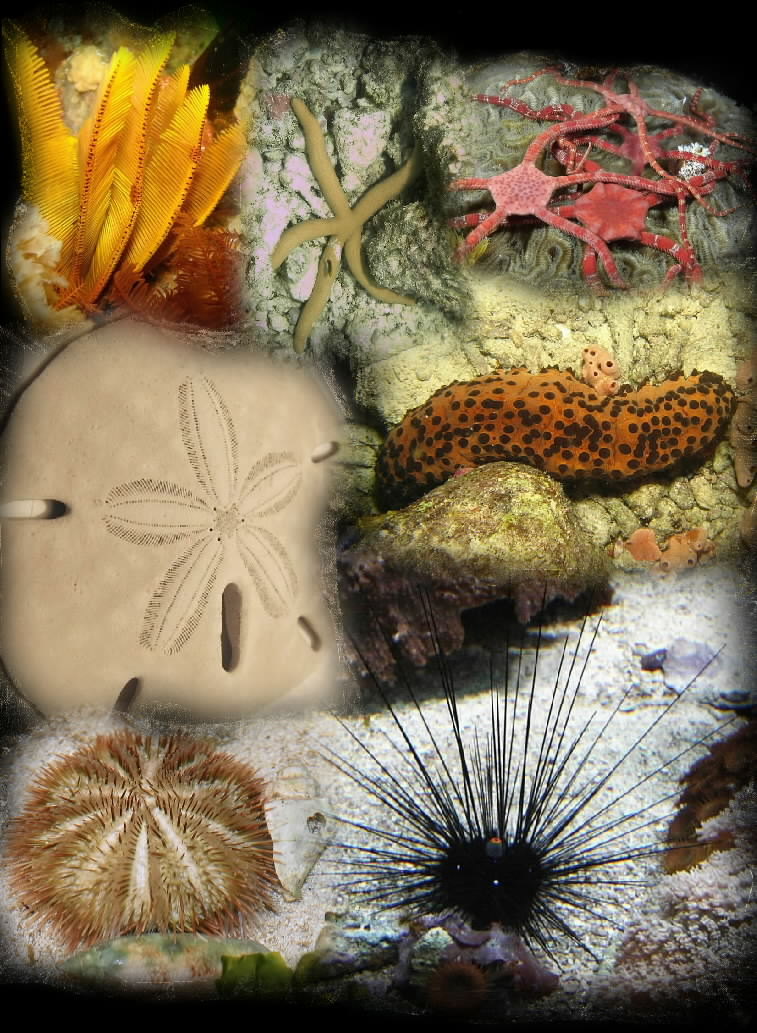
List of echinoderms of Venezuela

The echinoderms of Venezuela are a strictly marine animal phylum comprising about 124 species of marine waters designated for Venezuelan Caribbean. The first lists of species for Venezuelan coast date back to 1939 and 1967.

In Venezuela are five classes representatives living today: Crinoidea, Asteroidea, Ophiuroidea, Echinoidea and Holothuroidea. In this list are listed 105 species for the territory Venezuelan.

== List of species identified for Venezuela ==
=== Crinoidea (Sea Lilies) ===
Crinoidea
Species	Common name	Global distribution	Distribution by state (Note: The following codes are used: An: Anzoátegui; Ar: Aragua; Ca: Carabobo; DA: Delta Amacuro; DF: Dependencias Federales; Fa: Falcón; Mi: Miranda; Mo: Monagas; NE: Nueva Esparta; Su: Sucre; Va: Vargas; Zu: Zulia)	Image
Antedon bifida (Pennant, 1777)	Rosy Feather-star	Atlantic Ocean	Ar; Su; Va	
Davidaster rubiginosus (Pourtàles, 1869)	Sea lily	Caribbean Sea	Ar	
Tropiometra carinata (Lamarck, 1816)	Black and White Sea Lily	Atlantic Ocean, Indian Ocean	Ar; Ca; Fa; DF; Su; Va	

=== Asteroidea (Starfishs) ===
Asteroidea
Species	Common name	Global distribution	Distribution by state	Image
Anthenoides piercei Perrier, 1881	Starfish	Northwestern Atlantic Ocean, Caribbean Sea	NE; Su	
Asterinides folium (Lütken, 1859)	Common Blunt Armed Sea Star	Northwestern Atlantic Ocean, Caribbean Sea	Su	
Astropecten antillensis Lütken, 1859	Starfish	Northwestern Atlantic Ocean, Caribbean Sea	Su; Zu	
Astropecten brasiliensis Müller & Troschel (1842)	Starfish	Western Atlantic Ocean, Caribbean Sea	An; Fa; Mi; NE; Su	
Astropecten duplicatus Gray, 1840	Two-spined Star Fish	Northwestern Atlantic Ocean, Caribbean Sea	NE; Su; Va; Zu	
Astropecten marginatus Gray, 1840	Starfish	Northwestern Atlantic Ocean, Caribbean Sea	DA; Fa; NE; Su; Zu	
Echinaster brasiliensis Müller & Troschel, 1842	Starfish	Atlantic Ocean, Caribbean Sea	Su	
Echinaster echinophorus (Lamarck, 1816)	Starfish	Northwestern Atlantic Ocean, Caribbean Sea	DF; NE; Su	
Goniaster tesellatus (Lamarck, 1816)	Starfish	Atlantic Ocean	NE; Su	
Linckia guildingi Gray, 1840	Yellow Starfish	Cosmopolitan	NE	
Luidia alternata (Say, 1825)	Starfish	Caribbean Sea	NE; Su; Zu	
Luidia clathrata (Say, 1825)	Starfish	Atlantic Ocean, Southern Ocean	An; NE; Su; Zu	
Luidia senegalensis (Lamarck, 1816)	Nine-armed Sea Star	Northwestern Atlantic Ocean	Mi; NE; Su	
Oreaster reticulatus (Linnaeus, 1858)	Orange Starfish Cushion Sea Star	Caribbean Sea	Fa; Mi; Mo; NE; Su	
Tethyaster vestitus (Say, 1825)	Starfish	Caribbean Sea	DA; DF; Su	

=== Ophiuroidea (Sea spiders and sea snakes) ===
Ophiuroidea
Species	Common name	Global distribution	Distribution by state	Image
Amphiodia trychna H. L. Clark, 1918	Sea spiders	Caribbean Sea	An; Su	
Amphioplus coniortodes H. L. Clark, 1918	Sea spiders	Caribbean Sea	An; NE; Su	
Amphipholis januarii Ljungman, 1867	Sea spiders	Caribbean Sea	Su	
Amphipholis squamata (Delle Chiaje, 1828)	Small Brittle Star	Atlantic Ocean, Indian Ocean	NE; Su	
Amphiura palmeri T Lyman, 1882	Sea spiders	Caribbean Sea	Su	
Amphiura rathbuni Koehler, 1914	Sea spiders	Caribbean Sea	NE	
Amphiura stimpsonii Lútken, 1859	Sea spiders	Caribbean Sea	Su	
Asteronyx loveni Müller & Troschel, 1824	Pipe-cleaner Brittlestar	Northern Atlantic Ocean, Caribbean Sea	Fa	
Astrophyton muricatum (Lamarck, 1816)	Grifo Giant Basket Star	Caribbean Sea	Ar; DF; NE; Su	
Microphiopholis atra (Stimpson, 1852)	Sea spiders	Northwestern Atlantic Ocean, Caribbean Sea	An; DA; Mo; Su	
Microphiopholis gracillima (Stimpson, 1852)	Sea spiders	Caribbean Sea	Su	
Ophiactis muelleri Lütken, 1856	Sea spiders	Caribbean Sea	Su	
Ophiactis algicola H.L. Clark, 1933	Sea spiders	Caribbean Sea	Su	
Ophiactis savignyi (Müller & Troschel, 1842)	Savigny's Brittle Star	Atlantic Ocean, Caribbean Sea, Mediterranean Sea, Indian Ocean	DF; Mi; NE; Su	
Ophiocnida scabriuscula (Lútken, 1859)	Lobate Brittle Star	Caribbean Sea	Su	
Ophiocoma echinata (Lamarck, 1816)	Black Brittle Star	Caribbean Sea	Ar; DF; Fa; NE; Su	
Ophiocoma pumila Lütken, 1859	Banded Ophiocoma	Caribbean Sea	DF; Fa; Su; Va	
Ophiocoma wendtii Müller & Troschel, 1842	Red Ophiocoma	Atlantic Ocean, Caribbean Sea, Indian Ocean	NE; Su	
Ophiocomella ophiactoides (H. L. Clark, 1963)	Coralline Brittle Star	Caribbean Sea	Ar; Su	
Ophioderma appressa (Say, 1825)	Harlequin Brittle Star	Caribbean Sea	DF; Mi; NE; Su	
Ophioderma brevicauda Lütken, 1856	Short Spined Ophioderma	Caribbean Sea	Ca; DF; Fa; Mi	
Ophioderma brevispina (Say, 1825)	Sea spiders	Caribbean Sea	DF; Mi	
Ophioderma cinerea Müller & Troschel, 1842	Chocolate Brittle Star	Caribbean Sea	Su	
Ophioderma rubicunda Lütken, 1856	Ruby Brittle Star	Caribbean Sea	Su	
Ophiolepis elegans Lütken, 1859	Sea spiders	Caribbean Sea	An; DF; Mi; NE; Su	
Ophiolepis impressa Lütken, 1859	Sea spiders	Caribbean Sea	Mi; Su	
Ophiolepis paucispina (Say, 1825)	Scaly Brittle Star	Caribbean Sea	Su	
Ophiomyxa flaccida (Say, 1825)	Slimy Brittle Star	Caribbean Sea	DF; Su	
Ophionereis olivacea H. L. Clark, 1901	Sea spiders	Caribbean Sea	Su	
Ophionereis reticulata (Say, 1925)	Reticulated Brittle Star	Atlantic Ocean, Caribbean Sea	DF; NE; Su	
Ophionereis squamulosa Köehler, 1913	Sea spiders	Caribbean Sea	Su	
Ophiopsila hartmeyeri Koehler, 1913	Sea spiders	Caribbean Sea	Su	
Ophiopsila riisei Lütken, 1859	Sea spiders	Caribbean Sea	Ar; DF; Su	
Ophiophragmus wurdemani (Lyman, 1860)	Sea spiders	Caribbean Sea	Va	
Ophiothrix angulata (Say, 1825)	Angular Brittle Star	Northwestern Atlantic Ocean, Caribbean Sea	DF; Mi; NE; Su	
Ophiothrix brachyactis H. L. Clark, 1915	Sea spiders	Caribbean Sea	Su	
Ophiothrix oerstedii Lütken, 1856	Oersted's Brittle Star	Caribbean Sea	DF; NE; Su	
Ophiothrix suensonii Lütken, 1856	Suenson's Brittle Star	Caribbean Sea	NE; Su	
Ophiura acervata Lyman 1869	Sea spiders	Caribbean Sea	DA; Mo; Su	

=== Echinoidea (Sea urchins and sand dollar) ===
Echinoidea
Species	Common name	Global distribution	Distribution by state	Image
Arbacia punctulata (Lamarck, 1816)	Purple Sea Urchin.	Caribbean Sea	An; NE; Su	
Brissopsis elongata Mortensen, 1907		Caribbean Sea	An; Su	
Brissus unicolor (Leske, 1778)	Groove Burrowing Urchin	Atlantic Ocean, Caribbean Sea, Western Mediterranean Sea	An; DF; Su	
Clypeaster cyclopylus H.L.Clark, 1941		Venezuelan Caribbean Sea	DF (Archp. Los Testigos)	
Clypeaster euclastus H.L.Clark, 1941		Caribbean Sea	An, Ca, DA, DF, Fa	
Clypeaster lamprus H.L.Clark, 1914		Caribbean Sea	Va	
Clypeaster prostratus Ravenel, 1848		Caribbean Sea	Fa, Zu	
Clypeaster rosaceus (Linnaeus, 1758)	Sea Biscuit	Caribbean Sea	Fa; DF; NE	
Clypeaster subdepressus (Gray, 1825)	Sand Dollar	Caribbean Sea	An; Fa; NE; Su	
Diadema antillarum (Philippi & Agassiz, 1863)	Long-spined Sea Urchin	Atlantic Ocean, Caribbean Sea	Ar; Ca; DF; Mi; Su; Va	
Echinometra lucunter (Linnaeus, 1758)	Rock-boring Urchin	Caribbean Sea	An; Ar; Ca; DA; DF; Fa; Mi; Mo; NE; Su; Va; Zu	
Echinometra viridis Agassiz, 1863	Green Urchin	Caribbean Sea	Ar; Ca; DF; Fa; Mi	
Encope emarginata (Leske, 1778)	Sand Dollar, Cookie	Caribbean Sea	Ar; NE; Su	
Encope michelini Agassiz, 1841	Notched Sand Dollar	Caribbean Sea	Ar; NE; Su	
Eucidaris tribuloides (Lamarck, 1816)	Slate Pencil Urchin	Caribbean Sea	DF; Mi; NE; Su; Va; Zu	
Leodia sexiesperforata (Leske, 1778)	Six Holed Keyhole Urchin	Atlantic Ocean, Caribbean Sea	An; Ar; Ca; Mi; NE; Su; Va	
Lytechinus variegatus (Lamarck, 1816)	Variegated Sea Urchin	Caribbean Sea	An; Ar; Ca; DA; DF; Fa; Mi; Mo; NE; su; Va; Zu	
Mellita quinquiesperforata latiambulacra H. L. Clark, 1940	Dollar see; Cookie	Caribbean Sea	An; Ar; Ca; DA; Fa; Mi; Mo; NE; Su; Va; Zu	
Meoma ventricosa (Lamarck, 1816)		Caribbean Sea	DF; NE	
Moira atropos (Lamarck, 1816)		Caribbean Sea	Su;	
Plagiobrissus grandis (Gmelin, 1788)		Caribbean Sea	An; DA; Su	
Schizaster orbignyanus Agassiz, 1980		Caribbean Sea	An; DA; Su	
Tripneustes ventricosus (Lamarck, 1816)	Sea Egg	Caribbean Sea	DF; Fa; Mi; NE; Su; Va	

=== Holothuroidea (Sea Cucumbers) ===
Holothuroidea
Species	Common name	Global distribution	Distribution by state	Image
Aslia pygmaea (Théel 1886)		Venezuelan Caribbean sea	NE	
Aslia surinamensis (Semper 1868)		Caribbean Sea, Atlantic Ocean	NE	
Astichopus multifidus (Sluter, 1910)	Fissured Sea Cucumber	Caribbean Sea, Atlantic Ocean	DF	
Chiridota rotifera (Pourtalès, 1851)	Worm Cucumber	Caribbean Sea, Atlantic Ocean	Su	
Euthyonacta solida (Deichmann, 1930)		Caribbean Sea, Atlantic Ocean	Su	
Holothuria arenicola Semper, 1868		Caribbean Sea, Atlantic Ocean, Indian Ocean	Su	
Holothuria cubana Ludwig, 1875		Caribbean Sea, Atlantic Ocean	Su	
Holothuria glaberrima Selenka, 1867	Brown Rock Sea Cucumber	Caribbean Sea, Atlantic Ocean	Su	
Holothuria grisea (Selenka; 1867)	Gray Sea Cucumber	Caribbean Sea, Atlantic Ocean	Su	
Holothuria impatiens (Forskaal, 1775)	Impatient Sea Cucumber	Caribbean Sea, Atlantic Ocean, Mediterranean Sea, Indian Ocean	Su	
Holothuria mexicana Ludwig, 1875	Donkey Dung Sea Cucumber	Caribbean Sea, Atlantic Ocean	DF; Fa	
Holothuria occidentalis Ludwig, 1875		Caribbean Sea	Su	
Holothuria parvula (Selenka, 1867)	Golden Sea Cucumber	Caribbean Sea, Indian Ocean	Su	
Holothuria princeps (Selenka, 1867)		Caribbean Sea	Su	
Holothuria surinamensis Ludwig, 1875	Surinam Sea Cucumber	Caribbean Sea	Zu	
Holothuria thomasi Pawson & Caycedo, 1980	Tiger Tail Sea Cocumber	Caribbean Sea	su	
Isostichopus badionotus (Selenka, 1867)	Three-rowed Sea Cucumber	Caribbean Sea	DF; Su	
Lissothuria antillensis Pawson, 1967		Venezuelan Caribbean Sea	Su	
Lissothuria braziliensis (Théel, 1886)		Venezuelan Caribbean Sea	Su	
Ocnus suspectus (Ludwig, 1874)		Caribbean Sea	Su	
Pentamera pulcherrima Ayres, 1852		Nortrwestern Atlantic Ocean, Caribbean Sea	Su	
Pseudothyone belli (Luswig, 1887)		Caribbean Sea	Su	
Sclerodactyla briareus (Lesueur, 1824)		Caribbean Sea	Su	
Thyone pseudofusus Deichmann, 1930		Caribbean Sea	Su	
Thyonidium seguroensis (Deichmann, 1930)		Caribbean Sea	Su	

== See also ==
- List of birds of Venezuela
- List of introduced molluscs of Venezuela
- List of mammals of Venezuela
- List of marine molluscs of Venezuela
- List of molluscs of Falcón State, Venezuela
- List of non-marine molluscs of El Hatillo Municipality, Miranda, Venezuela
- List of non-marine molluscs of Venezuela
- List of Poriferans of Venezuela
