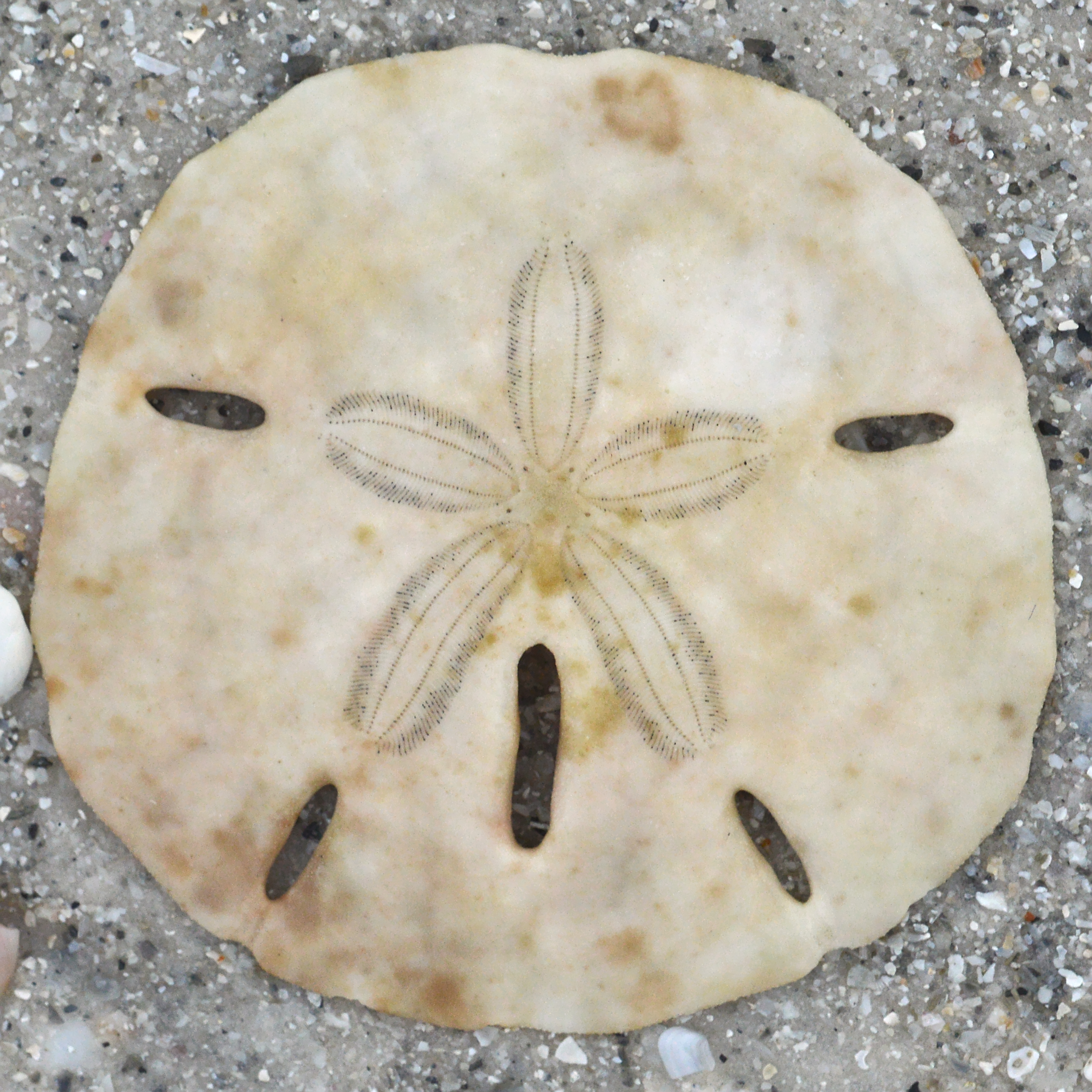

Scientific classification
- Kingdom: Animalia
- Phylum: Echinodermata
- Class: Echinoidea
- Order: Clypeasteroida
- Family: Mellitidae
- Genus: Mellita
- Species: M. tenuis

Binomial name
- Mellita tenuis H.L. Clark, 1940

= Mellita tenuis =

Species of Atlantic sand dollar

Mellita tenuis is a species of keyhole sand dollar in the family Mellitidae.

== Description ==
Mellita tenuis has a horizontally flattened test, similar to other species of sand dollars. The sand dollar can grow up to 15 cm in diameter. Symmetrically across the test are five holes called lunules, four of which are ambulacral and line up with the petals, and one of which is interambulacral and between two petals. The central lunule is a characteristic shared with other keyhole sand dollars in the genus. The outer tissue of the sand dollar is often gray, green, tan, or brown.

The genus Mellita contains multiple cryptic species, making it difficult to distinguish M. tenuis from other species of keyhole sand dollars.

== Distribution and habitat ==
Mellita tenuis is found along the coast of the United State from Louisiana to the western coast of Florida in the Gulf of Mexico. While the genus Mellita is cryptic, M. tenuis's range is not believed to overlap with any other species in the genus.

The sand dollar is found in sandy substrates, to allow it to easily burrow.
