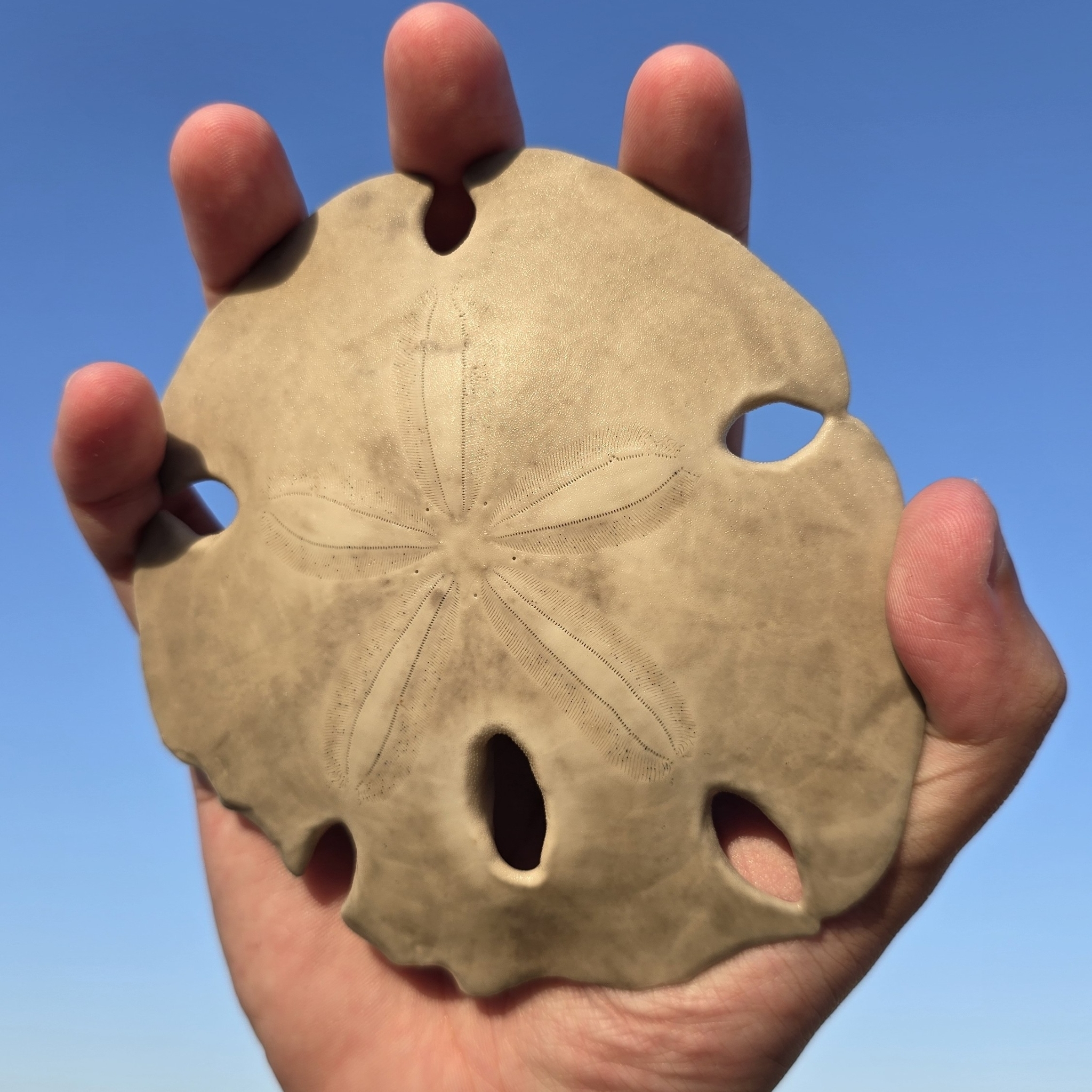

Scientific classification
- Kingdom: Animalia
- Phylum: Echinodermata
- Class: Echinoidea
- Order: Clypeasteroida
- Family: Mellitidae
- Genus: Encope
- Species: E. emarginata

Binomial name
- Encope emarginata (Leske, 1778)

= Encope emarginata =

Species of echinoderm

Encope emarginata, a notched sand dollar, is a marine echinoid ranging the western Atlantic ocean. They are best known for their bioturbation in the sediment, relationship with crabs, and their widespread distribution.

== Description ==
Encope emarginata has a thick test, or shell, that often remains intact and preserved. Tests are oval-shaped, centrally domed, typically greenish-brown colored, and have 6 lunules, or notches, as well as large bowed petaloids Young E. emarginata can be mistaken for its sibling, E. michelini, because of the presence of open lunules as juveniles, although closed as adults.

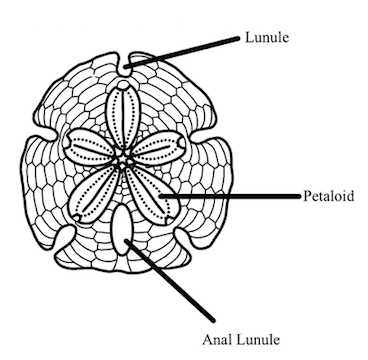
Basic anatomy of E. emarginata

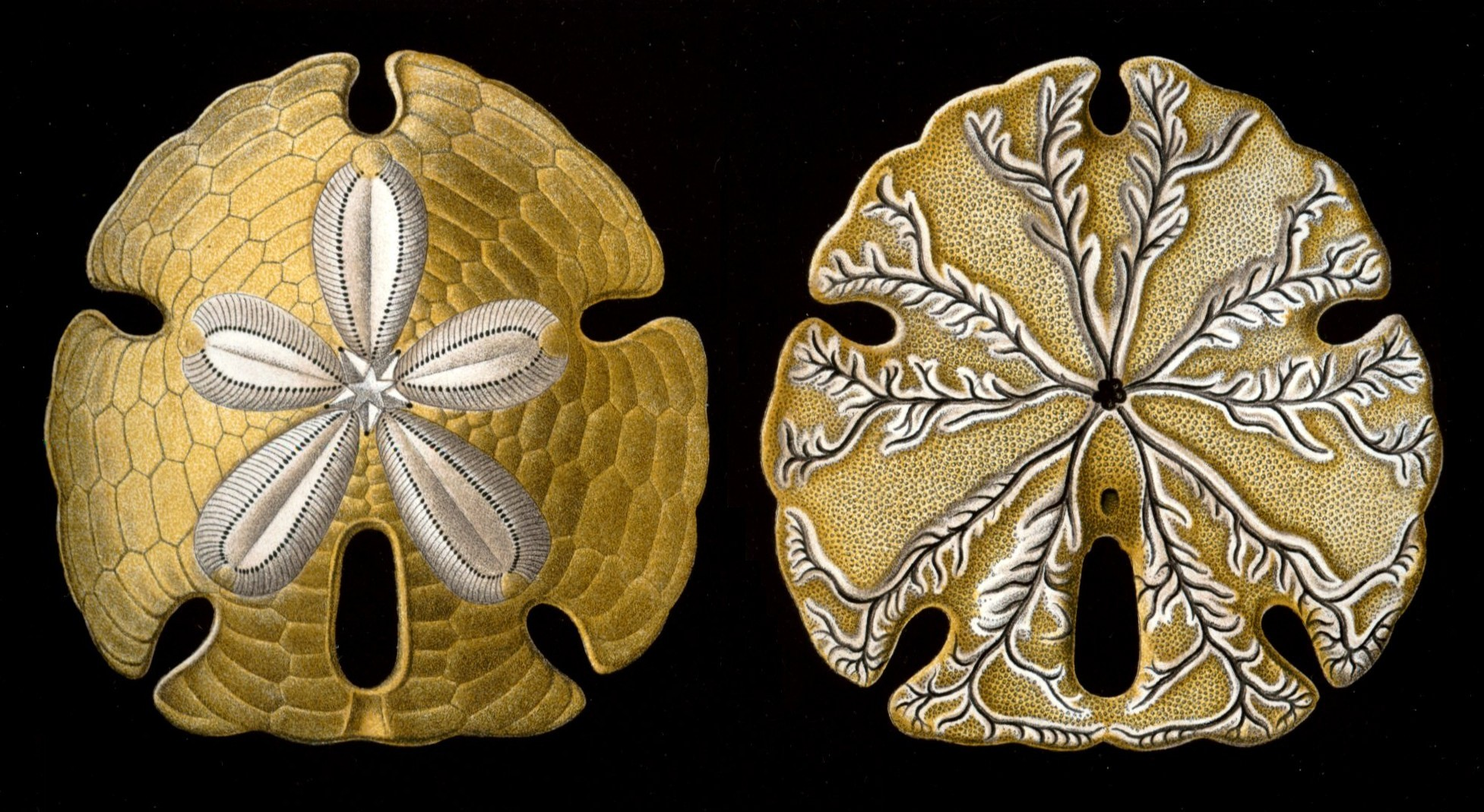
Drawing of the species by Ernst Haeckel published in 1904.

== Habitat and distribution ==
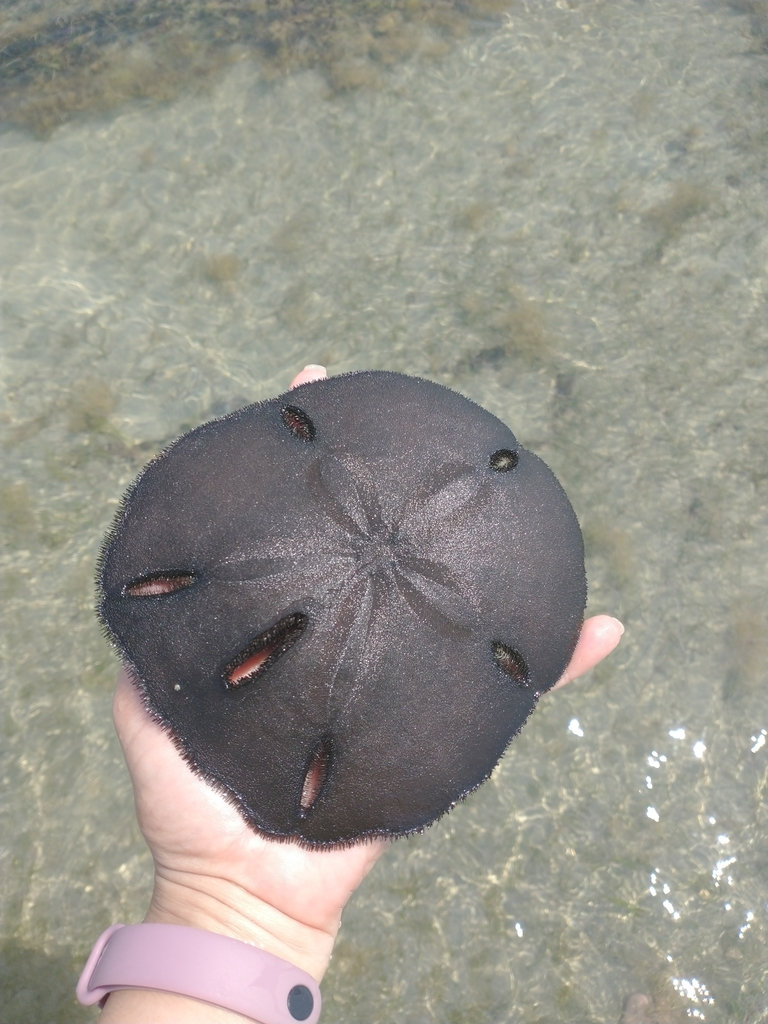
Notched sand dollar found on coast of Brazil by @fernandas via iNaturalist

Mostly found in subtropical and tropical waters of the Caribbean Sea, Gulf of Mexico, and southwestern Atlantic Ocean, E. emarginata ranges from Belize to Argentina. Common on the South America Atlantic coastline, they are one of the only extant echinoids found on the coast of Rio Grande do Sul (the other being Mellita quinquiesperforata) and the only one south of the La Plata river. Area inhibited by Encope emarginata is below the action of the normal wave regime, thus the fossils of this species is only truly disturbed during extreme coastal weather.

Encope emarginata inhabits sandy, muddy sediments of coastal waters. Although a marine species, they have also been found in estuaries and river mouths. The waters they live in are typically shallow, as deep as 20 meters.

== Taxonomy ==
These sand dollars were originally named Echinodiscus emarginatus, but have since been transferred to the Encope genus within the Mellitidae family. Encope is thought to be the most diverse genus among sand dollars, containing 7 extant species. Fossils can be dated back to the Pliocene or Pleistocene, up to 5 million years ago.

There is ongoing research suggesting that two populations of E. emarginata may emerge as separate species as a result of a barrier created by upwelling, a process known as allopatric speciation.

== Bioturbation ==
Encope emarginata is well-known for its bioturbation within the sediment, especially its effect on the spatial distributions of phytoplankton and other small benthic organisms. Moving at a maximum rate of 15 cm per hour, these sand dollars typically work through surface-layer sediments. E. emarginata has shown to have significant impacts on the concentrations of Chlorophyll-a within the sediment, as well as causing a greater variance in microphytobenthic and meiofaunal populations due to the sand dollars' foraging behaviors. The bioturbation of this echinoid is thought to create top-down effects, enhancing sediment heterogeneity and maintaining benthic biodiversity.

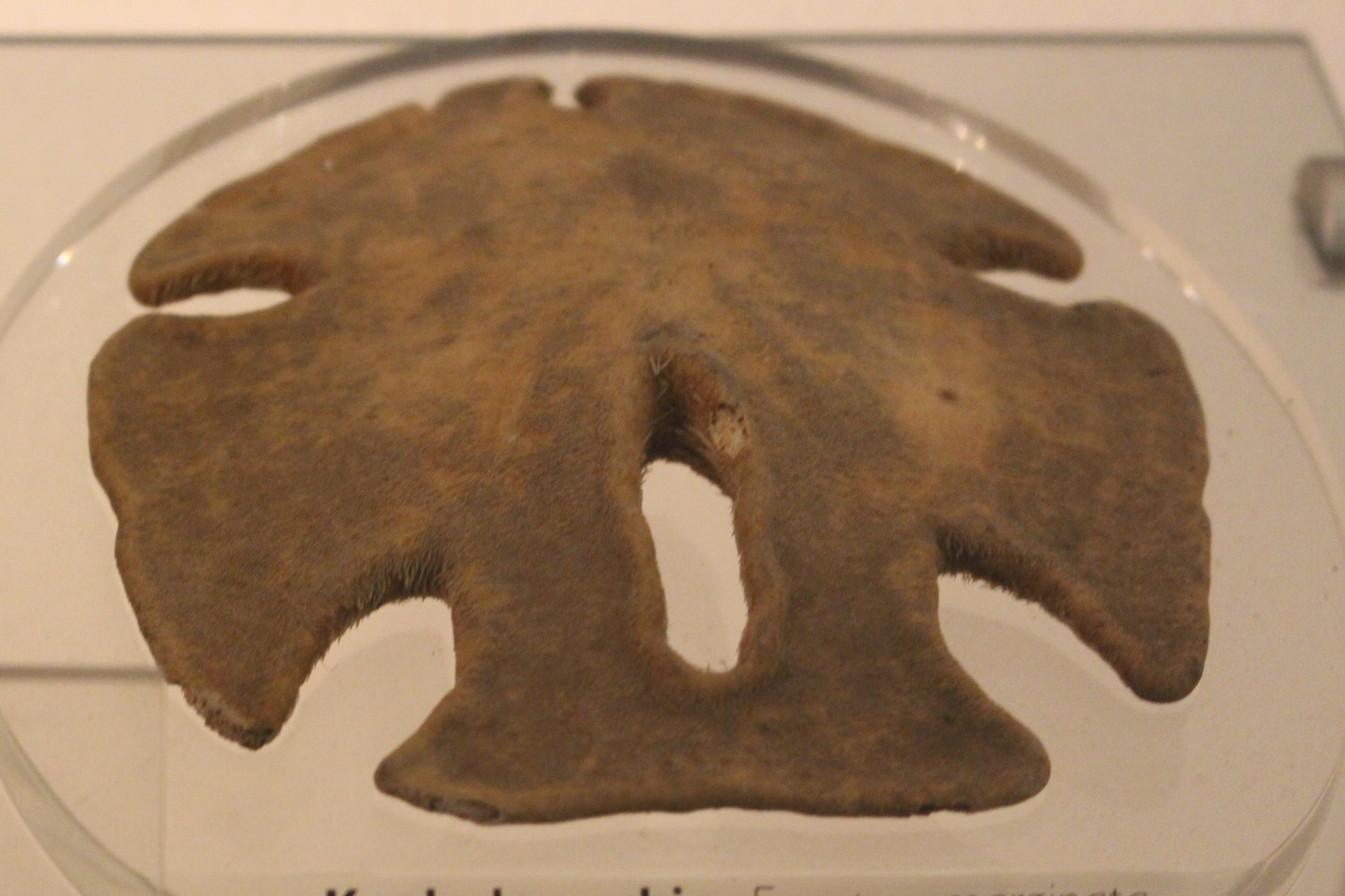
E. emarginata in the Natural History Museum in London, England

== Relationship with ectosymbiotic crabs ==
Genus Dissodactylus are commensal or parasitic crabs found to live on the bodies of irregular echinoids, such as E. emarginata. There is ongoing debate whether the size of E.emarginata influences the number of crabs found on it, where one study found a positive correlation and another found no relationship. The crabs are thought to consume the spines of the sand dollar, but additional research is necessary to determine if the Dissodactylus are truly parasitic.
