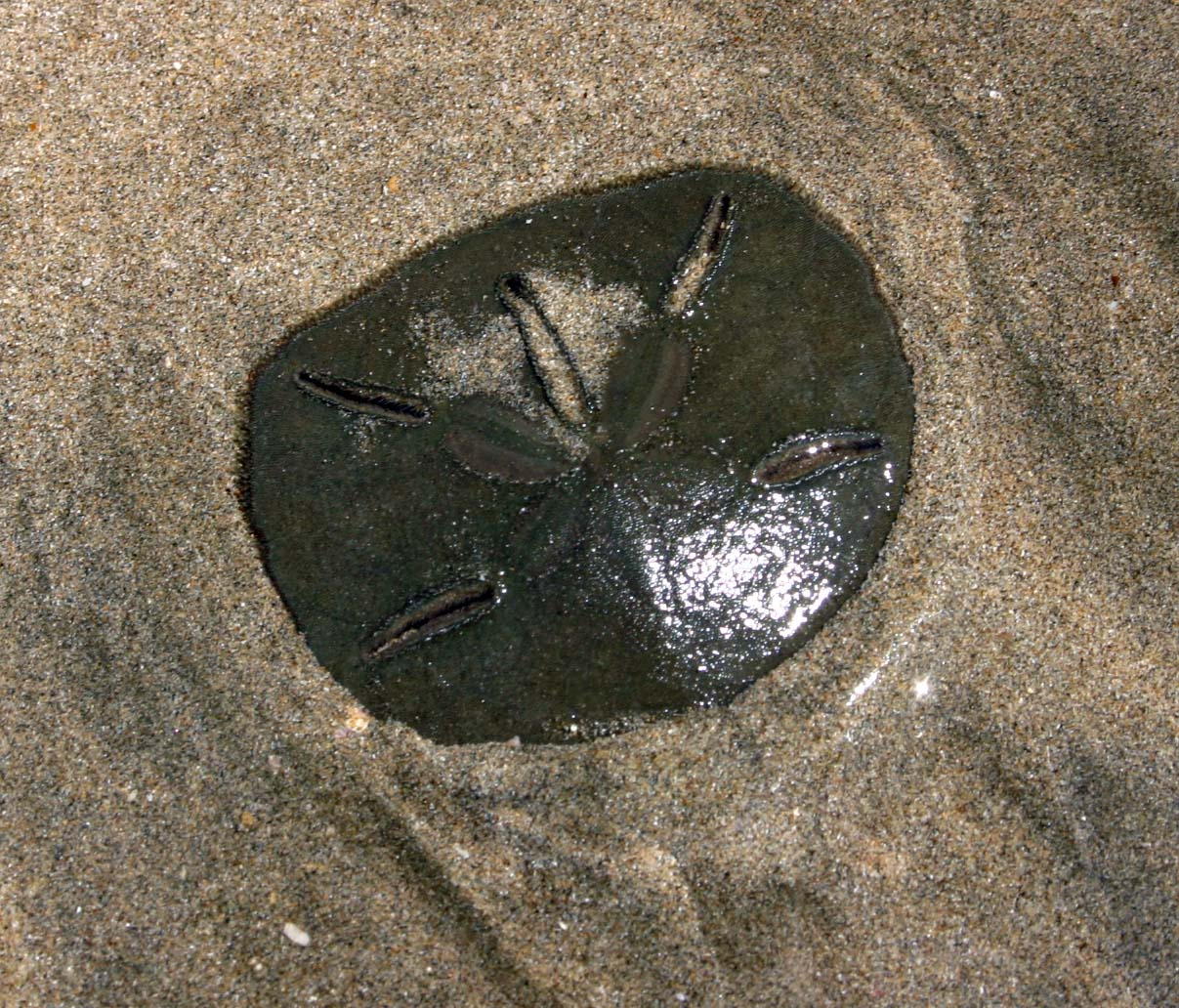
- Mellita quinquiesperforata (Costa Rica)

Scientific classification
- Kingdom: Animalia
- Phylum: Echinodermata
- Class: Echinoidea
- Order: Clypeasteroida
- Family: Mellitidae
- Genus: Mellita; L. Agassiz, 1841

Species
- †Mellita aclinensis Kier, 1963; Mellita isometra Harold & Telford, 1990; Mellita kanakoffi Durham, 1961; Mellita notabilis H.L. Clark, 1947; Mellita quinquiesperforata (Leske, 1778); Mellita tenuis H.L. Clark, 1940

= Keyhole sand dollar =

Common name for several species of sea urchin

Keyhole sand dollar refers to five living species of sand dollars in the genus Mellita, plus the extinct †Mellita aclinensis. They are found on the Atlantic coasts of the Americas, ranging across the Caribbean Islands (e.g. Bermuda, Jamaica and Puerto Rico), from the southern United States at the north, to the southeastern coast of Brazil at the south. Their range includes the Pacific coast of equatorial countries, such Central American countries and near, in the north sporadically across the Pacific coast of Mexico.

== Description ==
The velvet-like skin of live keyhole sand dollars is usually tan, brown, grey or dark green in colour. Like all sand dollars, they are found in shallow seawater below tide lines, where they burrow into the seabed to obtain food. The creatures feed on fine particles of plankton and other organic matter they filter from the water.

Keyhole sand dollars are so named because of the distinctive keyhole-shaped perforation toward the rear of the endoskeleton. This body shape offers an example of secondary front-to-back bilateral symmetry in an organism whose adult anatomy is primarily based on fivefold radial symmetry. The radial symmetry is characteristic of echinoids generally, including the ancestors of sand dollars. The bilateral features evolved as adaptations to a burrowing lifestyle.

Sand Dollars Mellita isometra ranges across the East coast of the United States. Mellita tenuis appears across the Caribbean and Gulf Coasts of Florida and nearby states. Mellita quinquiesperforata inhabits a wide range, from near the Mississippi Delta across Eastern coastal Mexico and the Caribbean region, and the Eastern coast of South America.

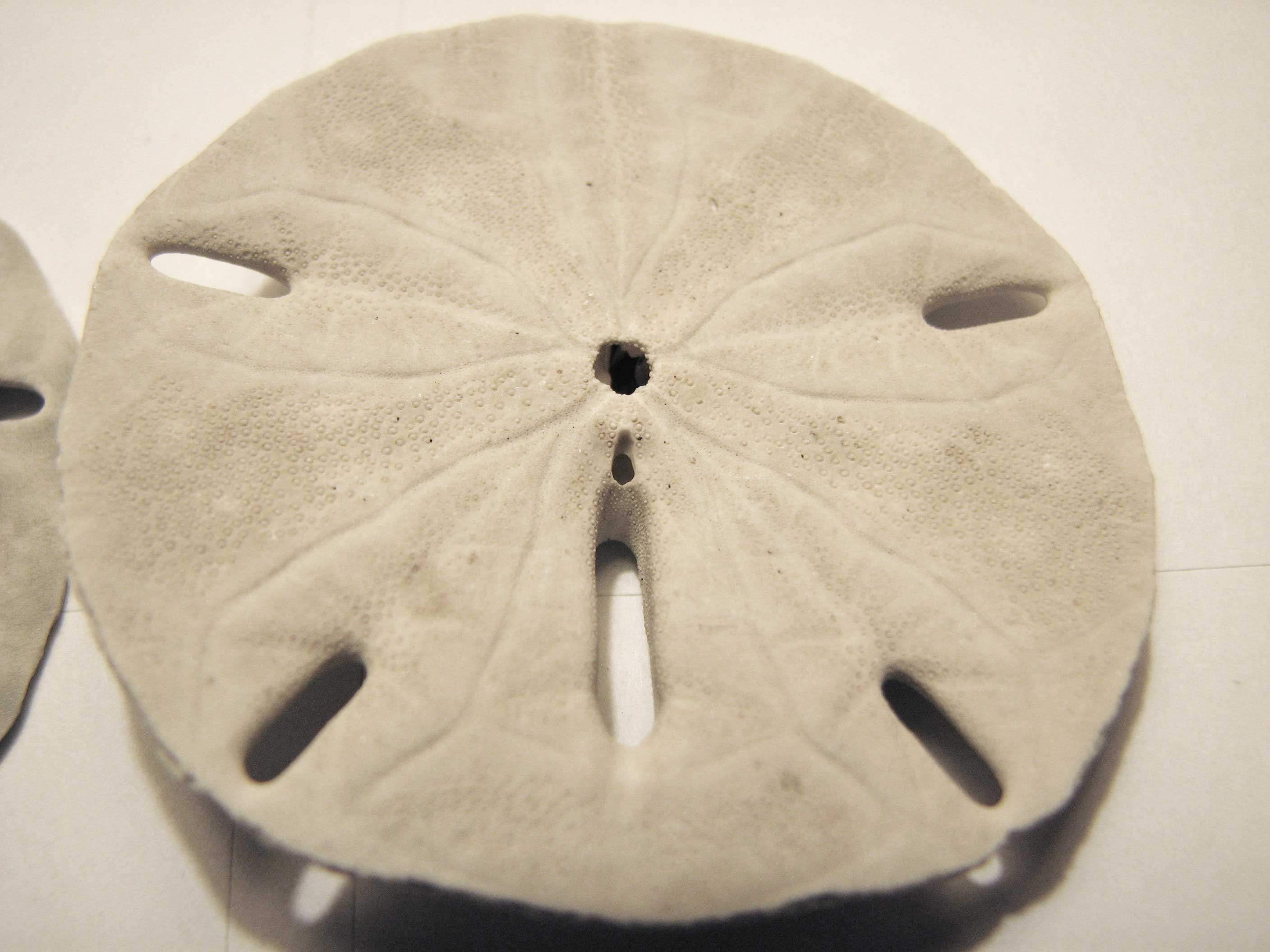
Openings for the mouth (center) and anus (below mouth) can be seen on the underside of the sand dollar test.

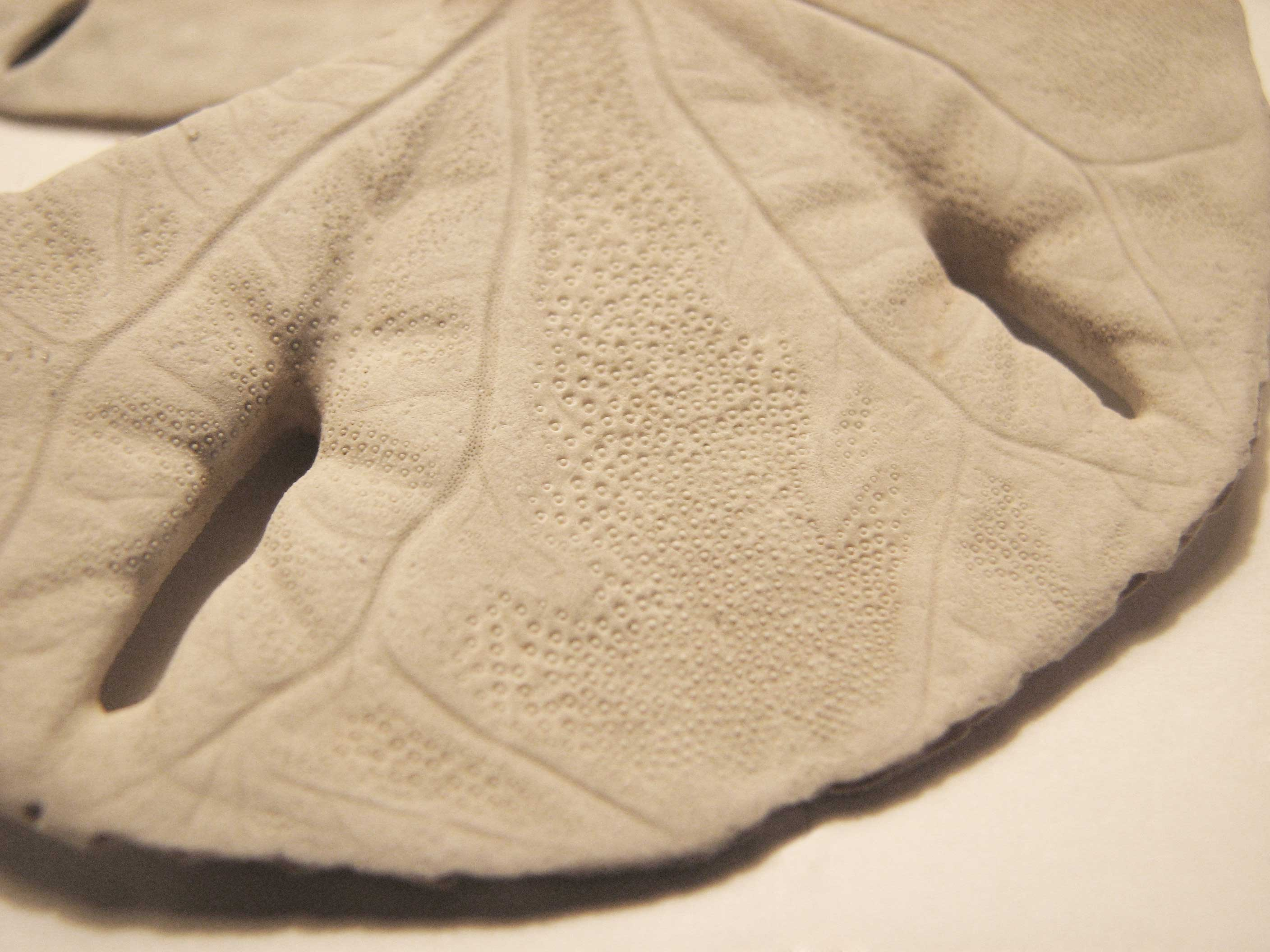
Hundreds of tube feet, called podia, project from the underside of the live animal to capture and move food and sediment particles to the mouth. The bumps, called tubercles, on which short spines rest, can be seen on the underside of the test. Locomotion on and through sediment is achieved by the spines moving in coordination.

== See also ==
- Sand dollar
- Echinoderms
