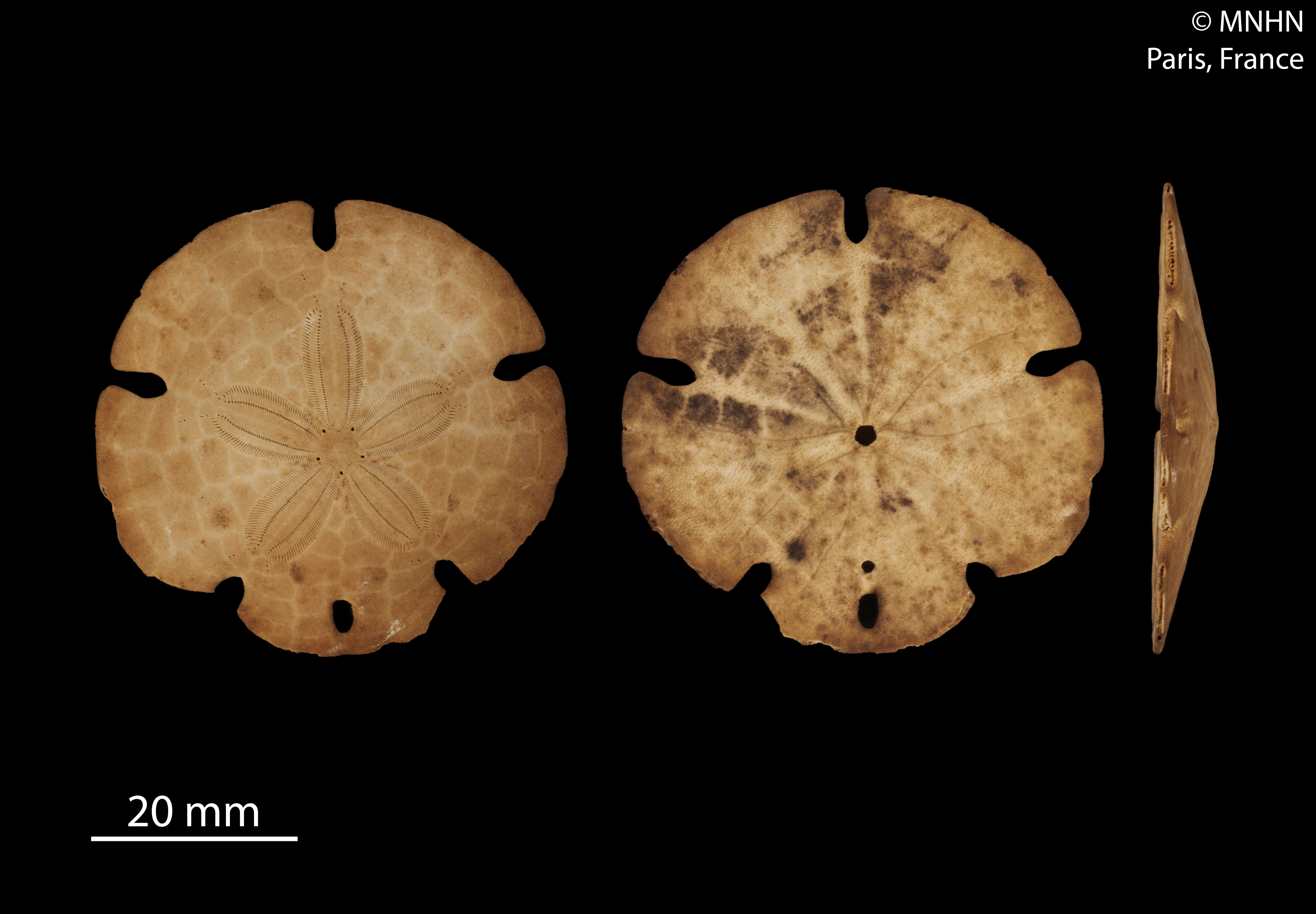
- Mellitella stokesii

Scientific classification
- Kingdom: Animalia
- Phylum: Echinodermata
- Class: Echinoidea
- Order: Clypeasteroida
- Family: Mellitidae
- Genus: Mellitella; Duncan, 1889

= Mellitella =

Genus of sand dollars

Mellitella is a genus of echinoderms belonging to the family Mellitidae.

Species:

- Mellitella californica Verrill
- Mellitella stokesii (L. Agassiz, 1841)
