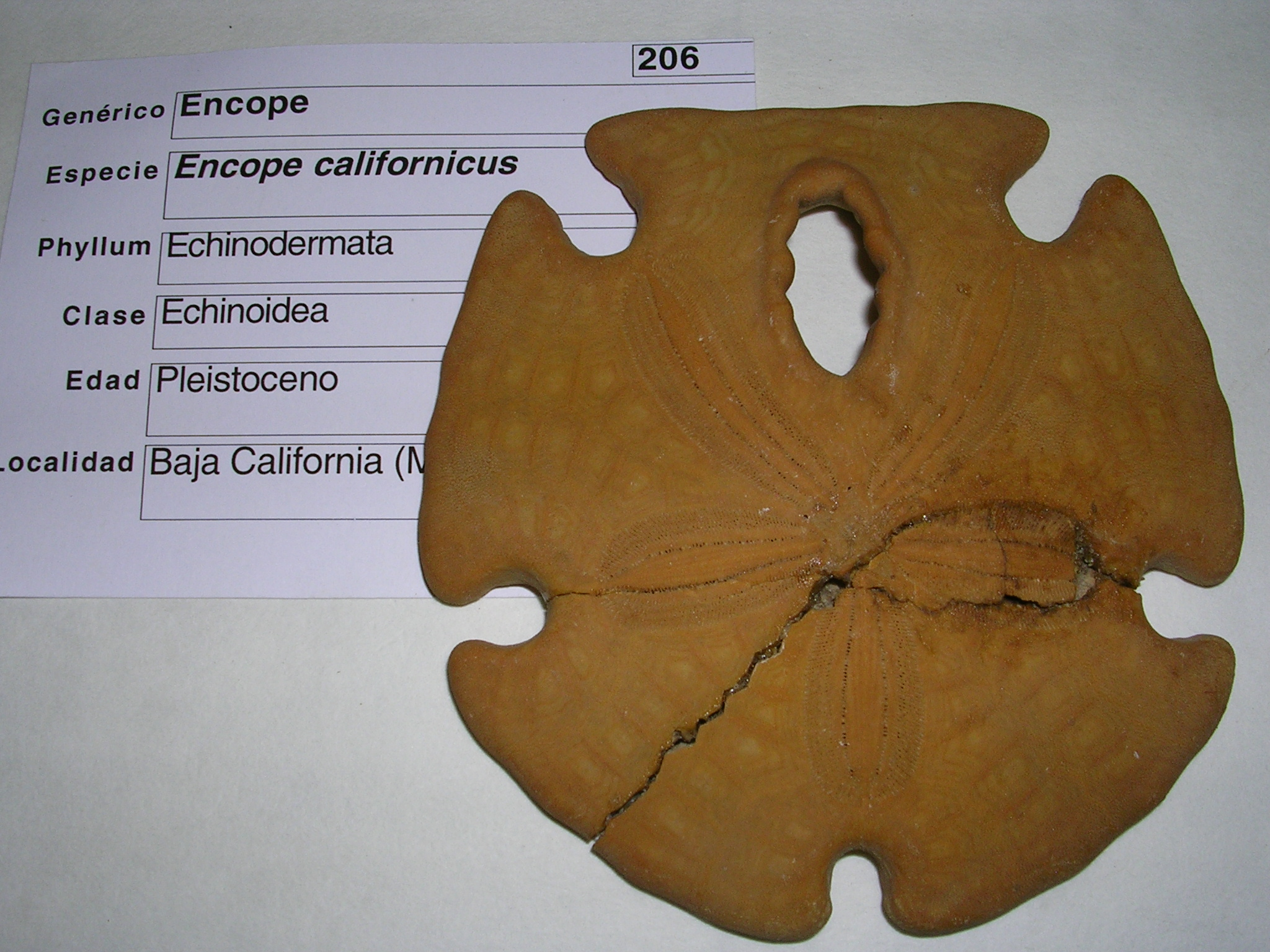
- Encope californicus

Scientific classification
- Kingdom: Animalia
- Phylum: Echinodermata
- Class: Echinoidea
- Order: Clypeasteroida
- Family: Mellitidae
- Genus: Encope; Agassiz, 1840

= Encope =

Genus of sand dollars

Encope is a genus of echinoderms belonging to the family Mellitidae.

The species of this genus are found off the Pacific and Atlantic coasts of the Americas.

Species:

- Encope aberrans Martens, 1867
- Encope angelensis Durham, 1950
- Encope annectans Jackson, 1917
- Encope arcensis Durham, 1950
- Encope borealis A.H. Clark, 1946
- Encope californica Verrill, 1870
- Encope carmenensis Durham, 1950
- Encope chaneyi Durham, 1950
- Encope chilensis Philippi, 1887
- Encope ciae Cortázar, 1880
- Encope emarginata (Leske, 1778)
- Encope falconensis Cooke, 1961
- Encope galapagensis A.H. Clark, 1946
- Encope gatunensis Toula, 1911
- Encope grandis L. Agassiz, 1841
- Encope homala Arnold & H.L. Clark, 1934
- Encope kugleri Jeannet, 1928
- Encope loretoensis Durham, 1950
- Encope macrophora (Ravenel, 1843)
- Encope megatrema Jackson, 1917
- Encope michelini L. Agassiz, 1841
- Encope michoacanensis Durham, 1994
- Encope micropora L. Agassiz, 1841
- Encope pacifica (Verrill, 1867)
- Encope peruviana Brighton, 1926
- Encope platytata Jackson, 1917
- Encope scrippsae Durham, 1950
- Encope secoensis Cooke, 1961
- Encope shepherdi Durham, 1950
- Encope sverdrupi Durham, 1950
- Encope tatetlaensis Böse, 1906
- Encope tenuis Kew, 1914
- Encope vonderschmitti Jeannet, 1928
- Encope wiedenmayeri Jeannet, 1928
