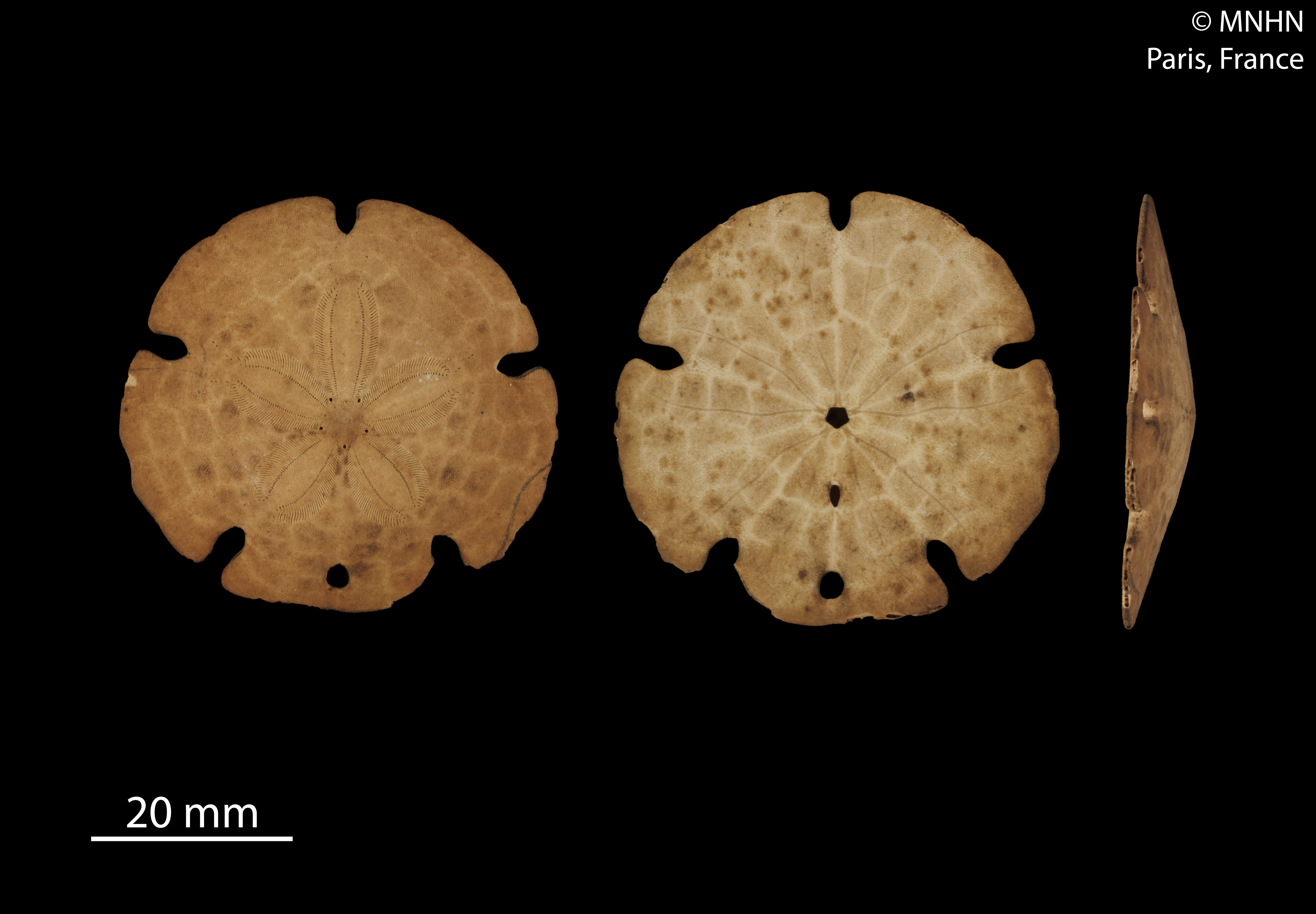

Scientific classification
- Kingdom: Animalia
- Phylum: Echinodermata
- Class: Echinoidea
- Order: Clypeasteroida
- Family: Mellitidae
- Genus: Mellitella
- Species: M. stokesii

Binomial name
- Mellitella stokesii (L. Agassiz, 1841)

Synonyms
- Echinoglycus stokesii(L. Agassiz, 1841); Encope stokesii L. Agassiz, 1841; Encope stokesii (L. Agassiz, 1841); Mellita stokesii (L. Agassiz, 1841); Mellitella stokesi

= Mellitella stokesii =

Species of sand dollar

Mellitella stokesii is a species of sand dollar within the family Mellitidae. The species is found in the eastern Pacific off the coasts of Mexico, Costa Rica, Panama, and Ecuador at depths up to 49 meters.
