= Ophiocoma scolopendrina =

Scientific classification
- Kingdom: Animalia
- Phylum: Echinodermata
- Class: Ophiuroidea
- Order: Ophiacanthida
- Family: Ophiocomidae
- Genus: Ophiocoma
- Species: O. scolopendrina

Binomial name
- Ophiocoma scolopendrina (Lamarck, 1816)

Synonyms
- Ophiocoma alternans von Martens, 1870; Ophiocoma lubrica Koehler, 1898; Ophiocoma molaris Lyman, 1862; Ophiocoma variabilis Grube, 1857; Ophiura scolopendrina Lamarck, 1816

Species of brittle star

Ophiocoma scolopendrina is a species of brittle star belonging to the family Ophiocomidae. Restricted to life in the intertidal, they live in the Indo-Pacific. They can typically be found within crevices or beneath borders on intertidal reef platforms.

Unlike other Ophiocoma brittle stars, they are known for their unique way of surface-film feeding, using their arms to sweep the sea surface and trap food. Regeneration of their arms are a vital component of their physiology, allowing them to efficiently surface-film feed. These stars also have the ability to reproduce throughout the year, and have been known to have symbiotic relationships with other organisms.

== Description ==
Ophiocoma scolopendrina, as other brittle stars, have long, thin arms emanating from a small, disk-shaped body and are about the size of an outstretched human hand. They belong to the phylum of echinoderms, which includes sea urchins, sea cucumbers, and sea stars. Dorsal disc and dorsal arm plates vary from variegated black to pale brown. They are irregularly banded. O. scolopendrina can reach a length of about 13cm, while the disc diameter can reach up to 25mm. The star's sexes can be identified by checking slits between the arms, which expose the white male spermaries and red female ovaries.

== Distribution and habitat ==
Ophiocoma scolopendrina can be found in the Red Sea, the tropical Indo-Pacific region, Taiwan, Eastern Africa, Southeastern Polynesia, the Marshall Islands, and Madagascar. Their typical density is about 20 individuals per 1 m^{2}.

These brittle stars are present in crevices and under boulders of intertidal reef platforms in the upper and middle eulittoral. They have also been seen underneath coral rubble. They typically hide amongst concealing vegetation during surface-film feeding. They live primarily in areas with shallow water strictly in the intertidal and are often observed sweeping their arms over sand or coral substrata.

== Feeding ==
=== Behavior ===
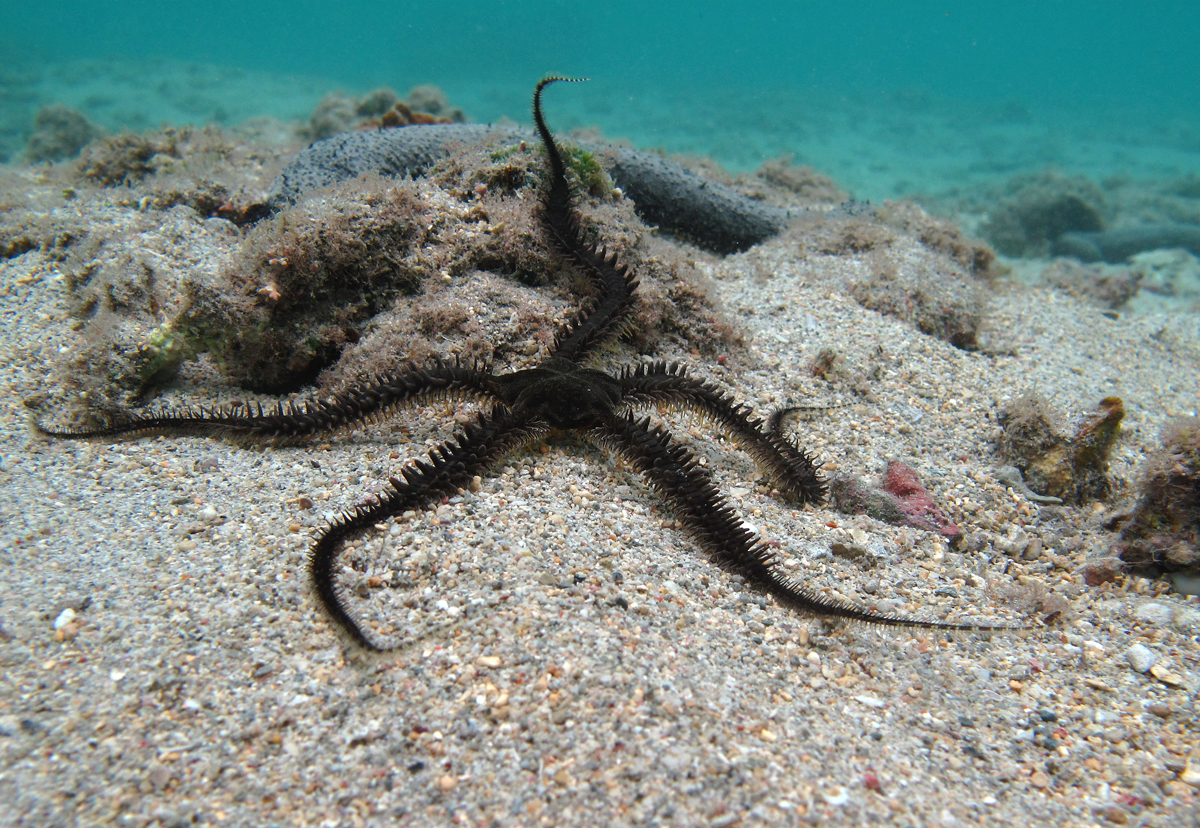
O. scolopendrina in its natural habitat

When feeding, O. scolopendrina changes its location depending on tide positionality. Stars have been observed to be nearly entirely concealed at high tide, and expose themselves progressively as the tide becomes lower. Unlike other brittle star species, these stars have evolved an adaptation that lets them participate in surface-film feeding during both low and flooding tides. This adaptation allows them to consume neuston and detrital particles and film that are found suspended on the surface of sea water.

During feeding, O. scolopendrina becomes fully exposed and remains attached to the ground by anchoring an arm to a substratum or piece of vegetation. Occasionally, they may also climb vegetation to gain better feeding positionality. The brittle star then utilizes two to four arms to sweep the sea surface, using its arms' ventral sides to trap suspended objects into mucus-covered spines. The food is then transferred to the mouth once the spines have been cleaned by tube feet.

Outside of flooding tide, these brittle stars simply participate in microphagous suspension and deposit-feeding, behavior that is common for other Ophiocoma species. During these types of feedings, arms are extended and food is caught from the water column into their mucus-covered spines during this process. This has typically been observed after a high tide. The unusual feeding pattern observed in Ophiocoma scolopendrina has been attributed to a variety of influences, including changes in tidal patterns, the presence of predation, and food availability.

== Reproduction ==
Ovarian substances have been noted to induce male spawn. Adult female stars each contain an estimated 12 * 10⁵ premature oocytes and it is believed that all adult O. scolopendrina produce gametes throughout the remainder of their lives. They consistently produce gametes at all studied ages. O. scolopendrina reproduce continuously throughout the year, as once gametes are available in the gonads, allowing them to spawn regardless of season. Ophiocoma scolopendrina have planktonic planktotrophic larvae and have been observed to spawn in large numbers.

== Regeneration ==
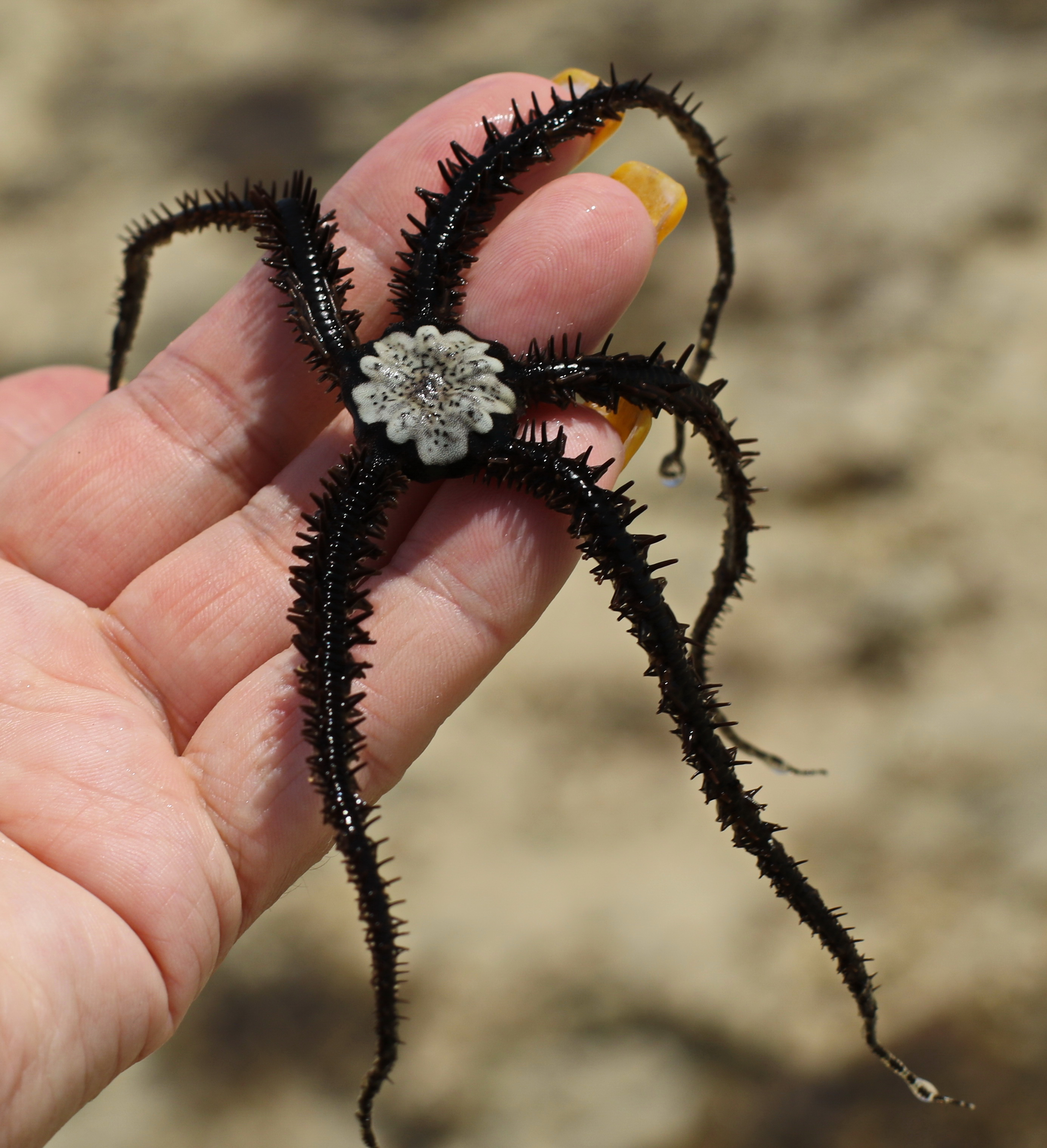
O. scolopendrina in Makadi Bay, Egypt

Similar to other types of brittle stars, O. scolopendrina has the ability to regenerate its arms. Stars may be injured by a variety of means, from general aggression and predation to the intense waves of their ecosystems. To account for this loss, stars regenerate these damaged portions of their arms, investing incredible amounts of energy as a means to survive for a longer amount of time. Regeneration, in turn, allows for the recuperation in functionality and strength in that arm. This adaptation has become vital in allowing brittle stars to survive even the harshest of environments.

Compared to other brittle stars, O. scolopendrina does not lose parts of its arms as rapidly as expected. Arms are important sources of feeding and have been noted to be used as a means of quick predator evasion. Since arms are used for both food capture and locomotion, O. scolopendrina are more hesitant to expose their arms to harmful situations.

Given O. scolopendrina's positionality in its ecosystem, breakage has typically been mainly observed in the top third of the arm. Since these types of stars spend a majority of their time hidden in crevices, only the tips of their arms suffer the most damage. In many cases, these arms remain functional, however, as the majority of the arm is not exceedingly damaged. Arms that are used for anchorage within crevices are those least likely to be lost as they are not frequently exposed to the dangers of the intertidal. Those that are out, whether it be for feeding or general sweeping, have been noted to be the arms most affected.

Multiple arm breakages have also been seen to occur in O. scolopendrina. As one arm may be damaged by a predator or ecological force, other arms must take its place as the most frequently used, causing them to suffer more harm than otherwise. Those that dwell in poor habitats are oftentimes more vulnerable to the forces of nature and are subject to consistent damage to their bodies. The average rate of regeneration is about 0.4 mm/day.

== Heterospecific symbiosis ==
Adult Ophiocoma scolopendrina have a heterospecific symbiotic relationship with juveniles of Ophiomastix annulosa in the intertidal zone of Okinawa, Japan. In this region, younger O. annulosa have been observed to attach to the bursae of the living O. scolopendrina host. It is thought that O. annulosa's hooked terminal spines may be advantageous in remaining attached to the host star, as they are difficult to dislodge. Symbionts typically switch hosts as they become larger, switching between new O. scolopendrina hosts as their size increases. The relationship between these stars has largely been considered a form of brood parasitism, as O. annulosa young are, in a sense, cared for by the O. scolopendrina adults and there is no physical damage to the host organism.
