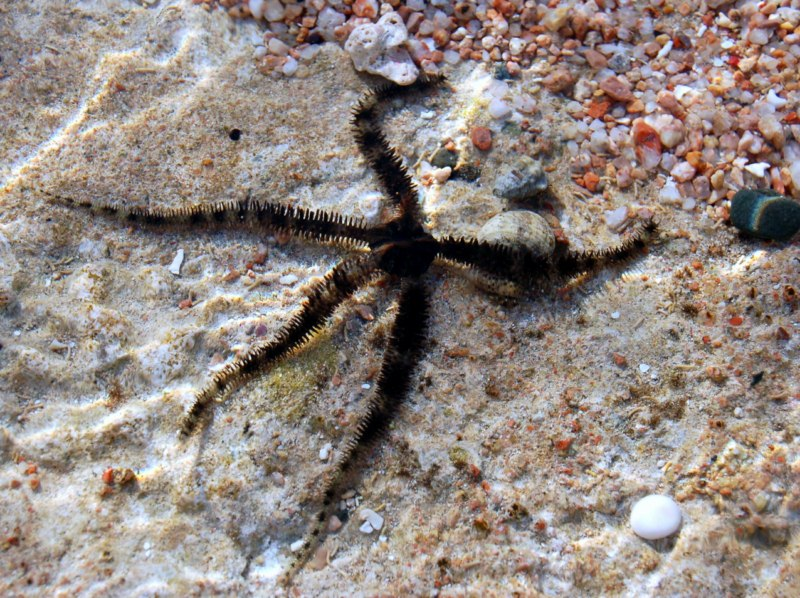
- Ophiocoma scolopendrina at Sharm El Sheik, Red Sea

Scientific classification
- Kingdom: Animalia
- Phylum: Echinodermata
- Class: Ophiuroidea
- Order: Ophiacanthida
- Family: Ophiocomidae
- Genus: Ophiocoma; L. Agassiz, 1835

= Ophiocoma =

Genus of brittle stars

Ophiocoma is a genus of brittle stars belonging to the family Ophiocomidae.

== Selected species ==
- Ophiocoma aethiops (Lütken, 1859)
- Ophiocoma echinata (Lamarck, 1816)
- Ophiocoma erinaceus (Müller & Troschel, 1842)
- Ophiocoma scolopendrina (Lamarck, 1816)
- Ophiocoma wendtii (Müller & Troschel, 1842)
