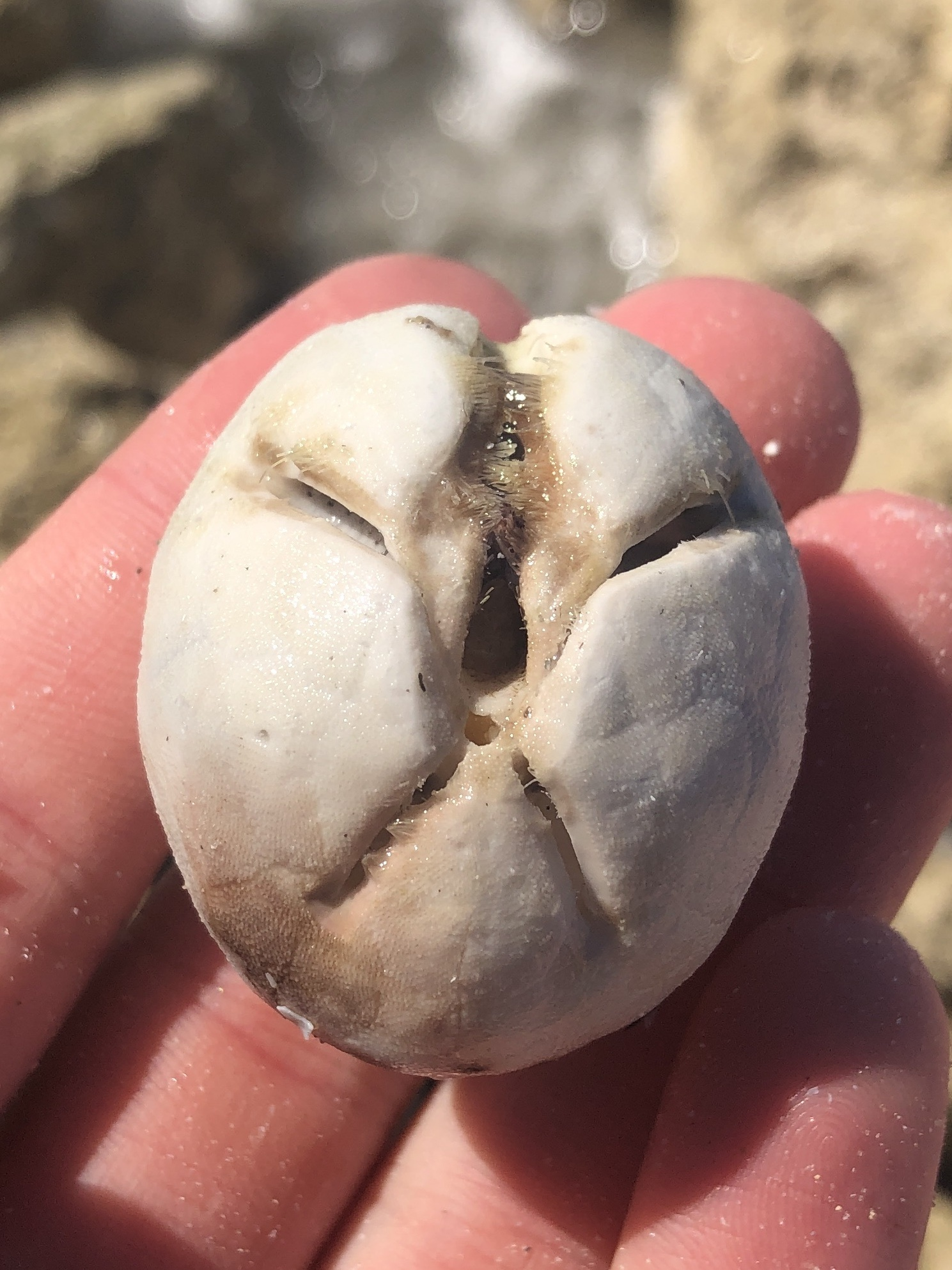
- Dead Moira atropos

Scientific classification
- Kingdom: Animalia
- Phylum: Echinodermata
- Class: Echinoidea
- Order: Spatangoida
- Family: Schizasteridae
- Genus: Moira
- Species: M. atropos

Binomial name
- Moira atropos (Lamarck, 1816)

= Moira atropos =

Species of sea urchin

Moira atropos, commonly known as the mud heart urchin, is a species of irregular sea urchin in the family Schizasteridae.

== Description ==
The mud heart urchin has an egg-shaped test that can grow up to 60 mm long and 32 mm wide. The test is covered with short spines that can be controlled through the heart urchin's water vascular system. These spines help to spread a secreted mucus that assists in burrowing Amongst the spines are black pincers that produce a toxin. The aboral side of the test has five deep, symmetrical creases for its tube feet. These ambulacrum are some of these deepest described in any echinoderm. The rear pair of these tube feet are the shortest. The mouth is on the bottom side near the front end and has a prominent lower lip. The anus is on the side, but at the rear margin.

== Distribution and habitat ==
The mud heart urchin can be found along the western coast of the Atlantic Ocean from the Carolinas in the United States to Brazil, including throughout the Gulf of Mexico. Within this range, the heart urchin lives on soft mud or sandy sediments that it can burrow into. This habitat extends from the low-tide line to about 146 m deep.

== Ecology ==
Similar to other irregular sea urchins, the mud heart urchin burrows into sediment. This burrowing can go to a depth of 15 cm. It has a particular affinity for muddy sediments, giving it its common name. It will leave a hole above it to allow for the flow of water.
