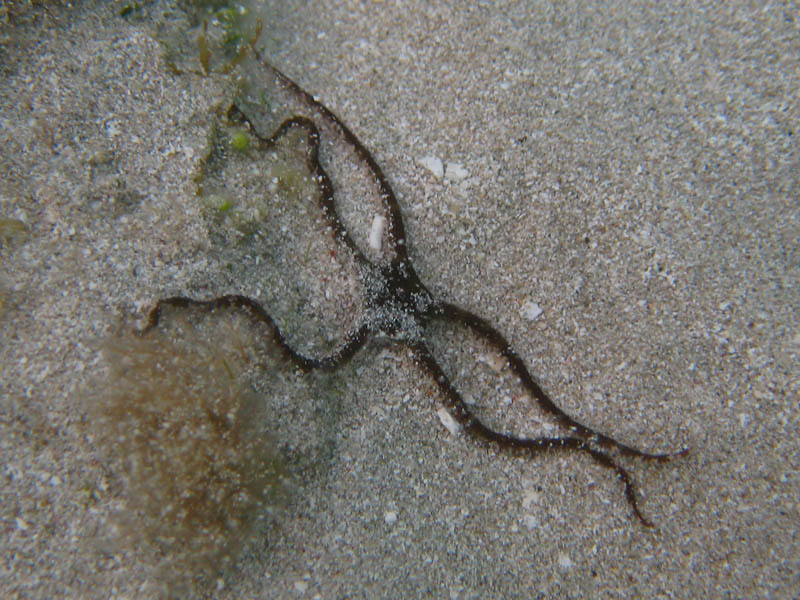

Scientific classification
- Kingdom: Animalia
- Phylum: Echinodermata
- Class: Ophiuroidea
- Order: Ophiacanthida
- Family: Ophiocomidae
- Genus: Ophiocoma
- Species: O. echinata

Binomial name
- Ophiocoma echinata (Lamarck, 1816)

Synonyms
- Ophiocoma crassispina (Say, 1825); Ophiocoma tumida Müller & Troschel, 1842; Ophiura crassispina Say, 1825; Ophiura echinata Lamarck, 1816

= Ophiocoma echinata =

Species of brittle star

Ophiocoma echinata, the spiny ophiocoma, is a species of brittle star belonging to the family Ophiocomidae. It is the type species of the genus Ophiocoma and is found in the tropical west Atlantic Ocean, the Caribbean Sea and the Gulf of Mexico.

== Description ==
Ophiocoma echinata is a large brittle star, with a maximum armspan of 25 cm (10 in). The slender, tapering arms are densely clad with short spines and are clearly demarcated from the disc. The colour is dark with pale or cream-coloured markings, but the arms never have any red markings.

== Distribution and habitat ==
Ophiocoma echinata is native to the tropical west Atlantic Ocean, the Caribbean Sea and the Gulf of Mexico. It is common throughout the Caribbean at depths down to about 30 metres (98 ft). It occurs in seagrass meadows, on reefs and reef flats, hiding under rocks, in cracks and crevices, under coral heads, and inside sponges.

== Behaviour ==
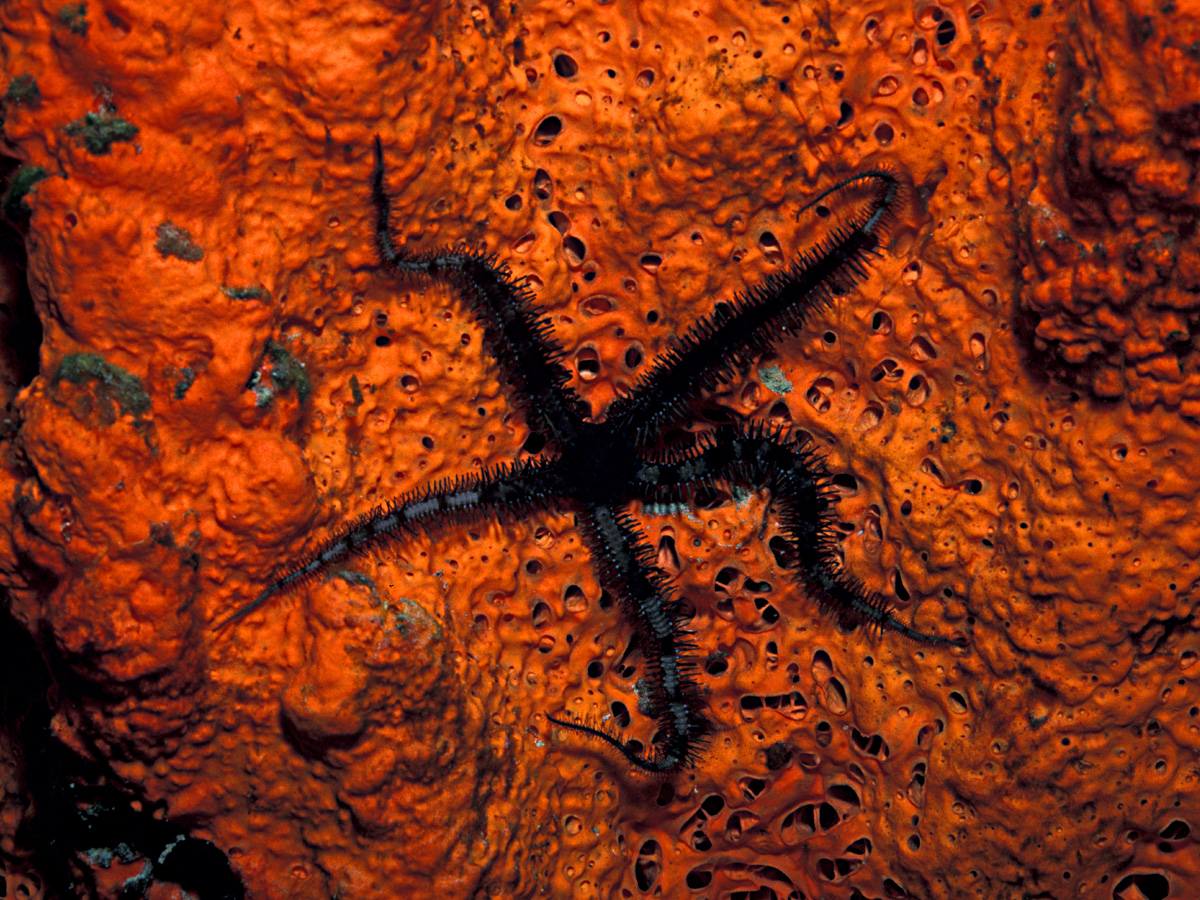
O. echinata on a (Agelas clathrodes) (Orange elephant ear sponge)

Ophiocoma echinata uses its arms to burrow in the sand and anchor itself in crevices. It holds some of its arms vertically in the passing water current to filter food particles, catching them with the spines and passing them along feeding channels to the mouth. The stomach is entirely within the central disc and is the organ of food storage. Reproduction takes place over a prolonged breeding season with gametes being shed directly into the sea without any synchronisation.

Locomotion involves raising the central disc off the substrate while the tube feet on the arms grip the surface. Despite having no brain and only having a simple, ring-shaped nervous system, O. echinata is able to adopt a coordinated pattern of locomotion in which one arm leads the way and the others act in synchrony to propel it forward. When the brittle star alters its direction of travel, it does not rotate, but instead a different arm becomes the lead arm and the other arms take on the subordinate role. This shows that a radially symmetrical animal can employ fully coordinated, bilaterally symmetrical locomotion.

When attacked by a predator, O. echinata sometimes autotomises (sheds) one or more of its arms. In a back-reef habitat in the Florida Keys, up to 47% of the individuals were found to have missing or damaged arms, and it took about two years for individuals with three missing arms to completely regenerate them. Losing a limb rather than its life is beneficial to the brittle star. Although energy must be diverted to effect the repair and regrowth, the individual should still be able to breed at some time in the future, and the missing arm contributes a renewable resource to the productivity of the reef.
