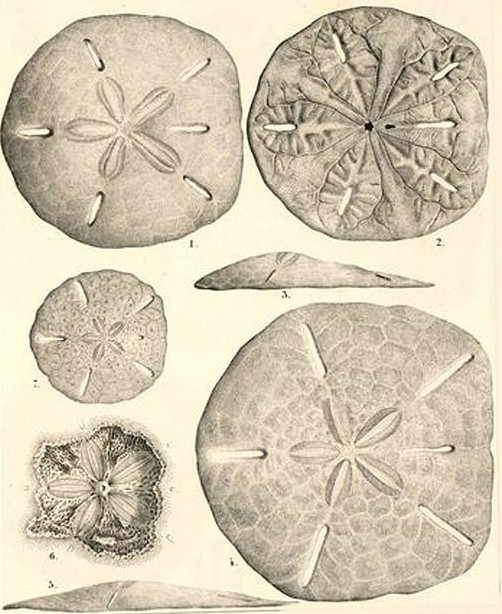
- Illustration by Louis Agassiz, 1841

Scientific classification
- Kingdom: Animalia
- Phylum: Echinodermata
- Class: Echinoidea
- Order: Clypeasteroida
- Family: Mellitidae
- Genus: Leodia
- Species: L. sexiesperforata

Binomial name
- Leodia sexiesperforata (Leske, 1778)

Synonyms
- Echinodiscus sexiesperforatus Leske, 1778; Echinus hexaporus Gmelin, 1791; Leodia richardsonii Gray, 1851; Mellita erythraea Gray, 1851; Mellita hexapora (Gmelin, 1791); Mellita platensis Bernasconi, 1947; Mellita sexforis (Lamarck, 1816); Mellita similis L. Agassiz, 1841; Scutella hexapora (Gmelin, 1791); Scutella sexforis Lamarck, 1816

= Leodia sexiesperforata =

Species of sea urchin

Leodia sexiesperforata, commonly known as the six-holed keyhole urchin, is a species of sand dollar, in the echinoderm order Clypeasteroida. It is native to tropical and sub-tropical parts of the western Atlantic Ocean where it buries itself in soft sediment in shallow seas.

== Description ==
Like other sand dollars, Leodia sexiesperforata is radially symmetrical and flattened dorso-ventrally, having a circular or semi-pentagonal shape, but it also displays secondary, front-to-back bilateral symmetry. It is usually somewhere between 4.8 and 14.5 cm (1.9 and 5.7 in) in diameter. The mouth is on the oral (under) surface and is surrounded by the peristome and five deep, narrow food grooves, that branch as they near the margin. On the aboral (upper) surface of the test are five short, petal-like areas which are used as gills and six oval lunules (slots) which give the species its name "sexiesperforata". Five of these slots are in the ambulacral areas and the sixth is on the posterior interambulacral area. The anus is located in this lunule.

The aboral surface is shallowly domed, the highest point being at the anterior petal, while the oral surface is flat. The body surface is covered with small spines which give it a velvety appearance. The colour of this sand dollar varies but is usually some shade of yellowish-brown or pale brown.

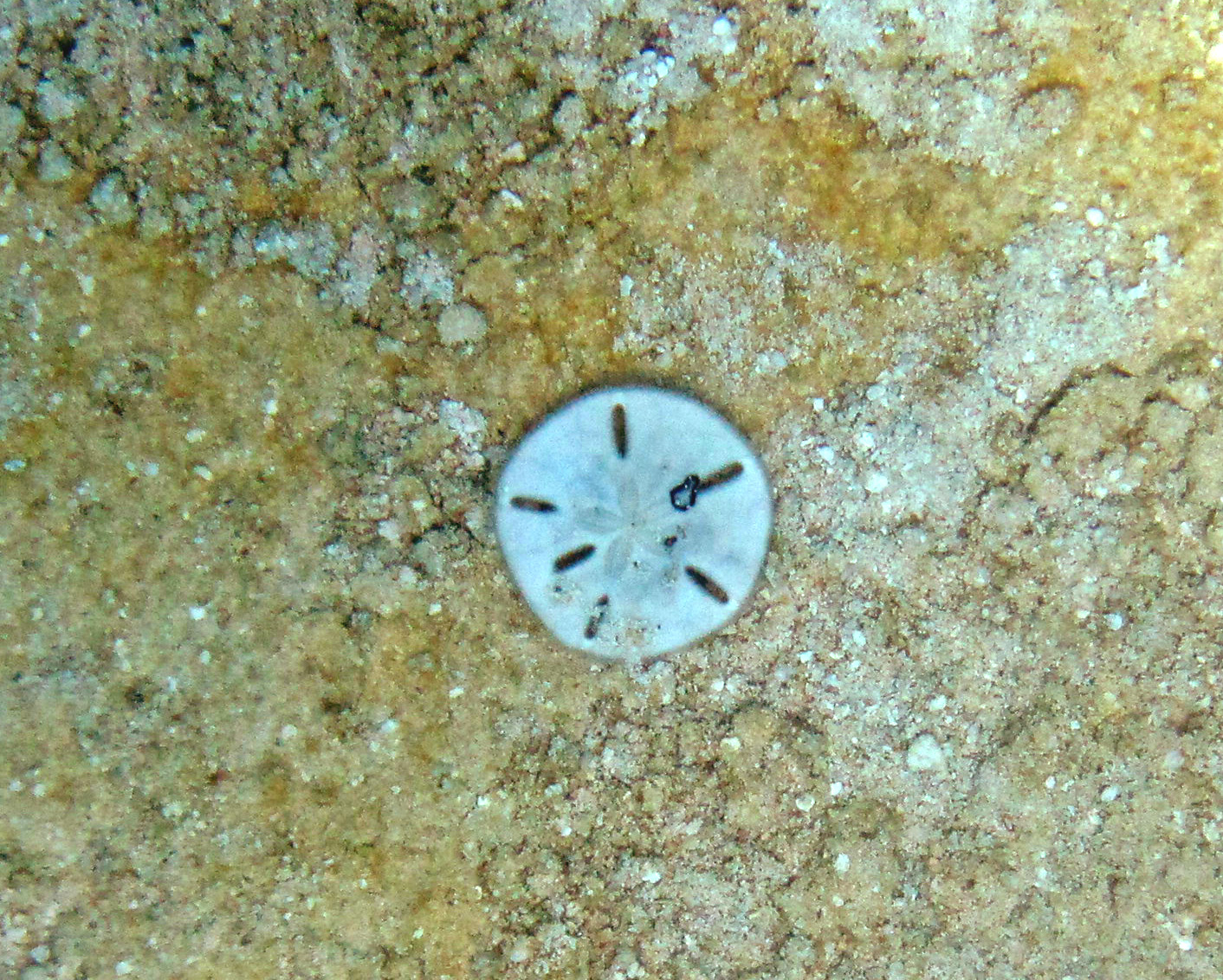

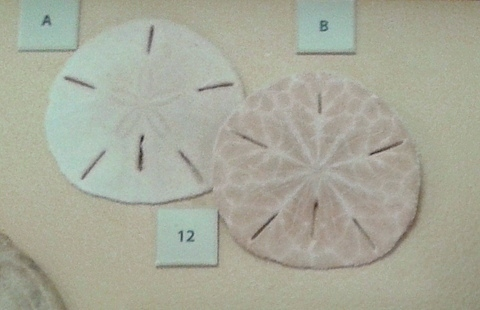

== Distribution and habitat ==
Leodia sexiesperforata is native to the tropical and sub-tropical western Atlantic Ocean. Its range extends from North Carolina southwards to Uruguay. It is found at depths down to about 60 m (200 ft) but is commonest at less than half that depth. It inhabits sandy areas where there is little seagrass or algal growth.

== Ecology ==
Leodia sexiesperforata inhabits the seabed and buries itself in the soft sediment to a depth of 2.5 cm (1 in) or so. It can bury itself in five to seven minutes. The purpose of the lunules may be to equalise pressure above and below the sand dollar, thus reducing lift and helping prevent it from being washed away by strong currents. It feeds on detritus and small organic particles, picking them up with the tube feet on the oral surface, moving them to the food grooves and thence to the mouth, where they are ground up by the teeth.
