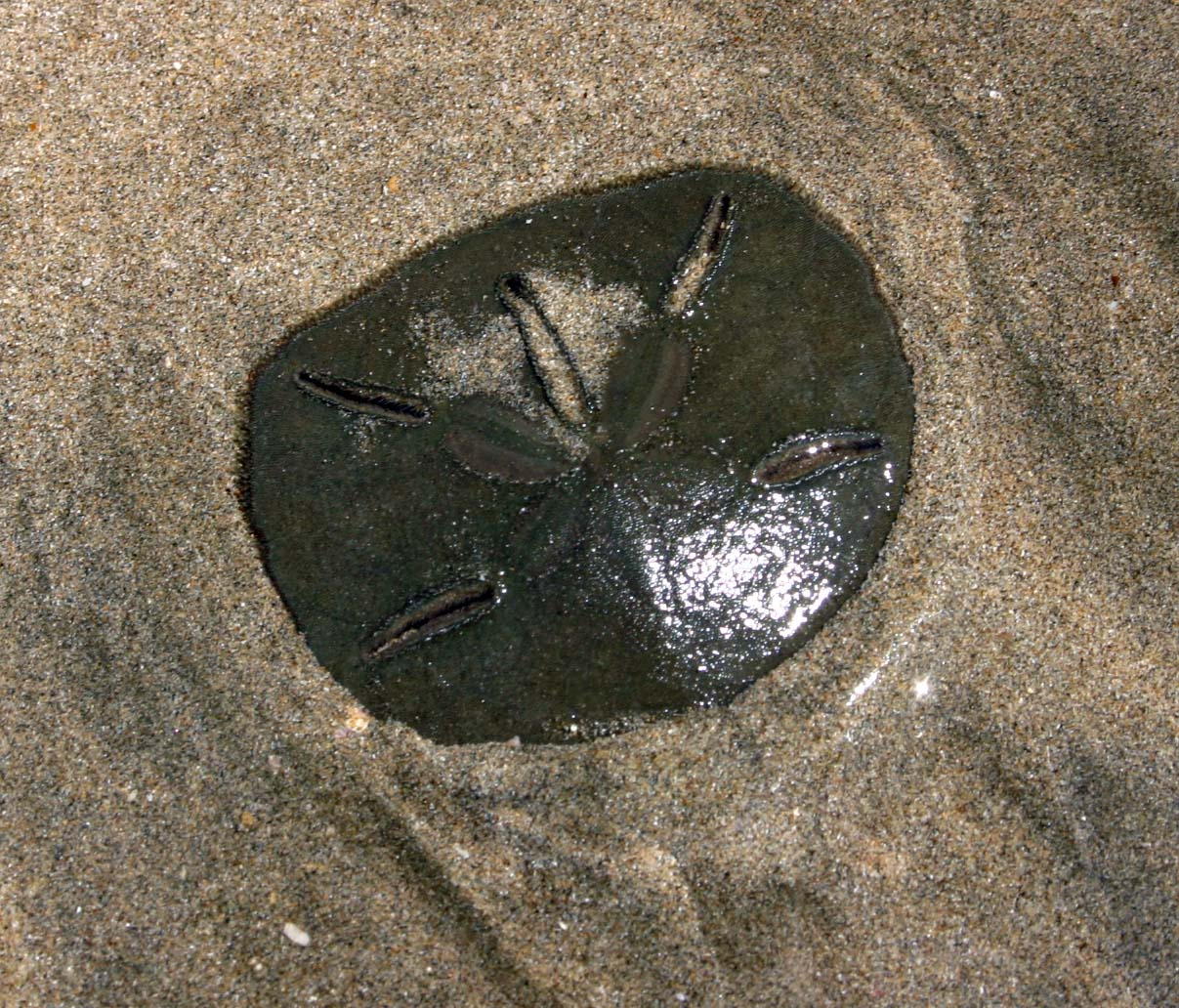
- Live M. quinquiesperforata, Pacific coast, Costa Rica

Scientific classification
- Kingdom: Animalia
- Phylum: Echinodermata
- Class: Echinoidea
- Order: Clypeasteroida
- Family: Mellitidae
- Genus: Mellita
- Species: M. quinquiesperforata

Binomial name
- Mellita quinquiesperforata (Leske, 1778)

= Mellita quinquiesperforata =

Species of sea urchin

Mellita quinquiesperforata is a tropical species of sand dollar, a flat, round marine animal related to sea urchins, starfish, and other echinoderms. They have been found to possess significantly more food in the gut at night than in the day. This species can be found along the eastern coast of the United States and the coast of Brazil. Inverted sand dollars are able to recognize flow direction and respond by modifying their orientation to maximize lift and drag for righting their position.

== Distribution ==
The five-holed keyhole urchin, also known as the sand dollar, resides in the Atlantic Ocean off the Eastern coast of North, Central, and South America. They can be found anywhere near the coast of South Carolina, from Hilton Head to Myrtle Beach. Their dried exoskeletons are a common sight on sandy beaches, often in the high tide zone.

== Habitat ==
The five-holed keyhole urchin prefers fine-grained sand in the infralittoral zone, which is shallow and dominated by marine algae. To keep from being tossed around by the current, they form extensive beds parallel to the shoreline, just beyond the breaker zone. Studies show that bed structure and density are associated with the dynamic nature of tidal zones and can vary from beach to beach. Spatial dispersion within a bed, as well as individual growth rate, has also been correlated with water depth.

== Feeding ==
Like starfish, the keyhole urchin possesses tube feet and cilia for locomotion and spines for burrowing into the sand. Their skeletons, called tests, are made of calcium carbonate. This echinoderm uses its numerous tube feet to pick up food items, including copepods, algae, seaweed, and small shellfish. Then, its cilia help move the food to its mouth, which is in the center of its body.

== Reproduction ==
Keyhole urchins are dioecious and reproduce sexually through external fertilization. The breeding season typically lasts from spring to summer, resulting in millions and millions of free-swimming offspring. Following the larval stage, young urchins will eat and store sand in order to weigh themselves down. While larvae exhibit bilateral symmetry, adults are radially symmetrical.

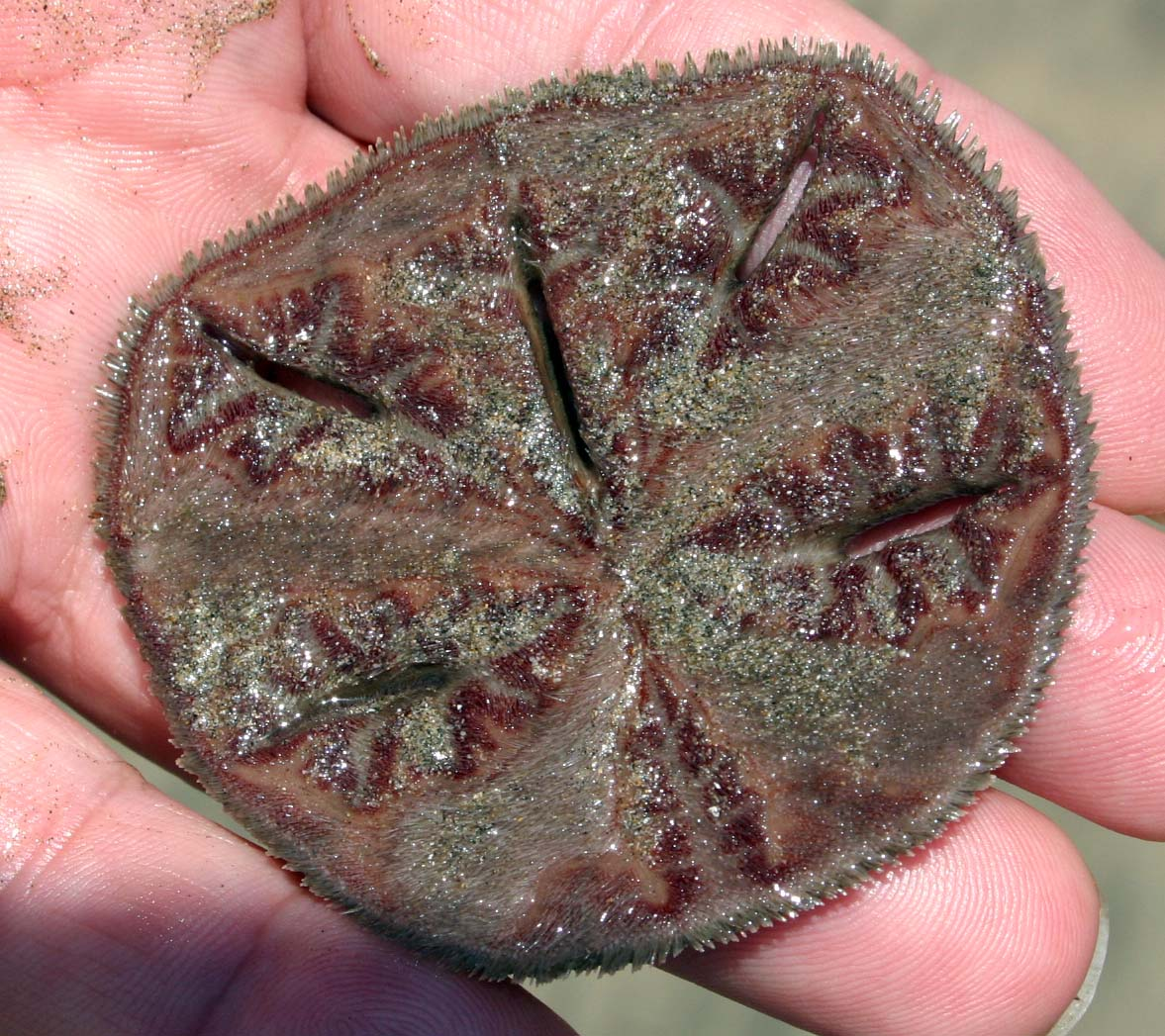
Live M. quinquiesperforata (underside)
