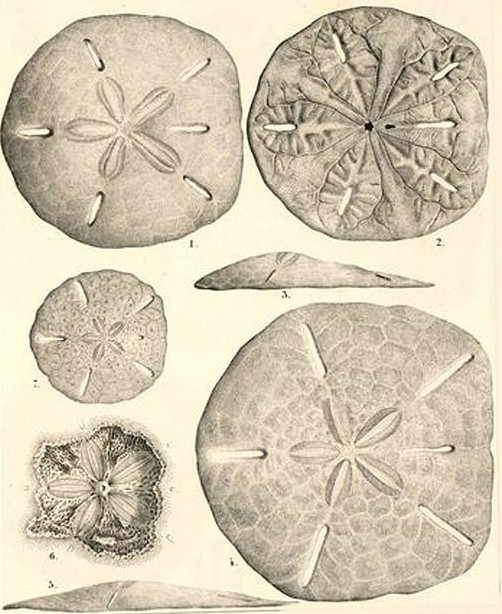
- Illustration of Leodia sexiesperforata by Louis Agassiz, 1841

Scientific classification
- Kingdom: Animalia
- Phylum: Echinodermata
- Class: Echinoidea
- Order: Clypeasteroida
- Suborder: Scutellina
- Family: Mellitidae; Stefanini, 1912

Genera
- see text

= Mellitidae =

Family of sea urchins

Mellitidae is a family of sand dollars, in the echinoderm order Clypeasteroida. These irregular sea urchins bury themselves in soft sediment in shallow seas.

== Genera ==
The World Register of Marine Species includes the following genera in the family:-

- Encope L. Agassiz, 1840
- Lanthonia Coppard, 2016
- Leodia Gray, 1851
- Mellita L. Agassiz, 1841
- Mellitella Duncan, 1889
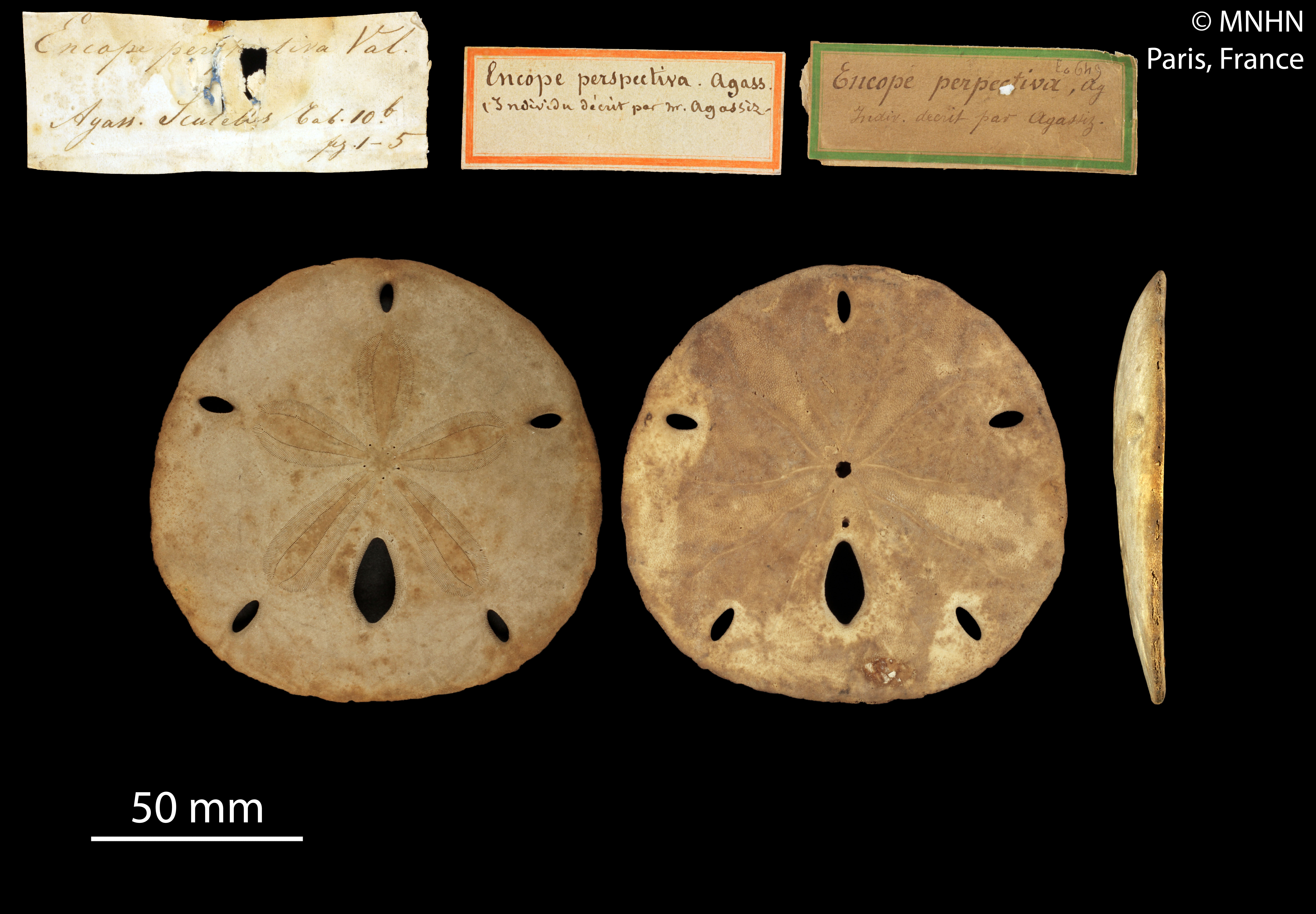
Encope perspectiva (MNHN)

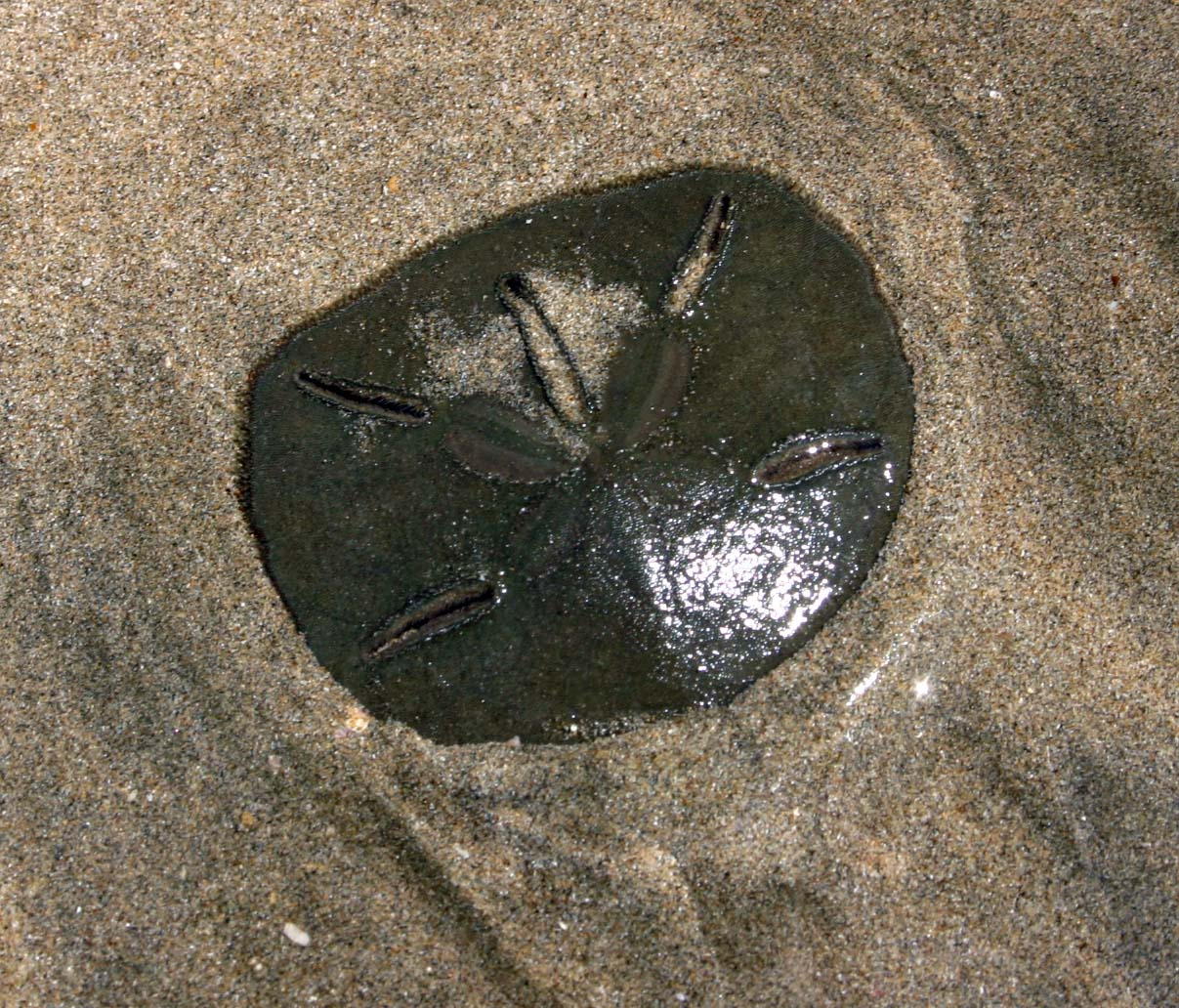
Lanthonia longifissa.

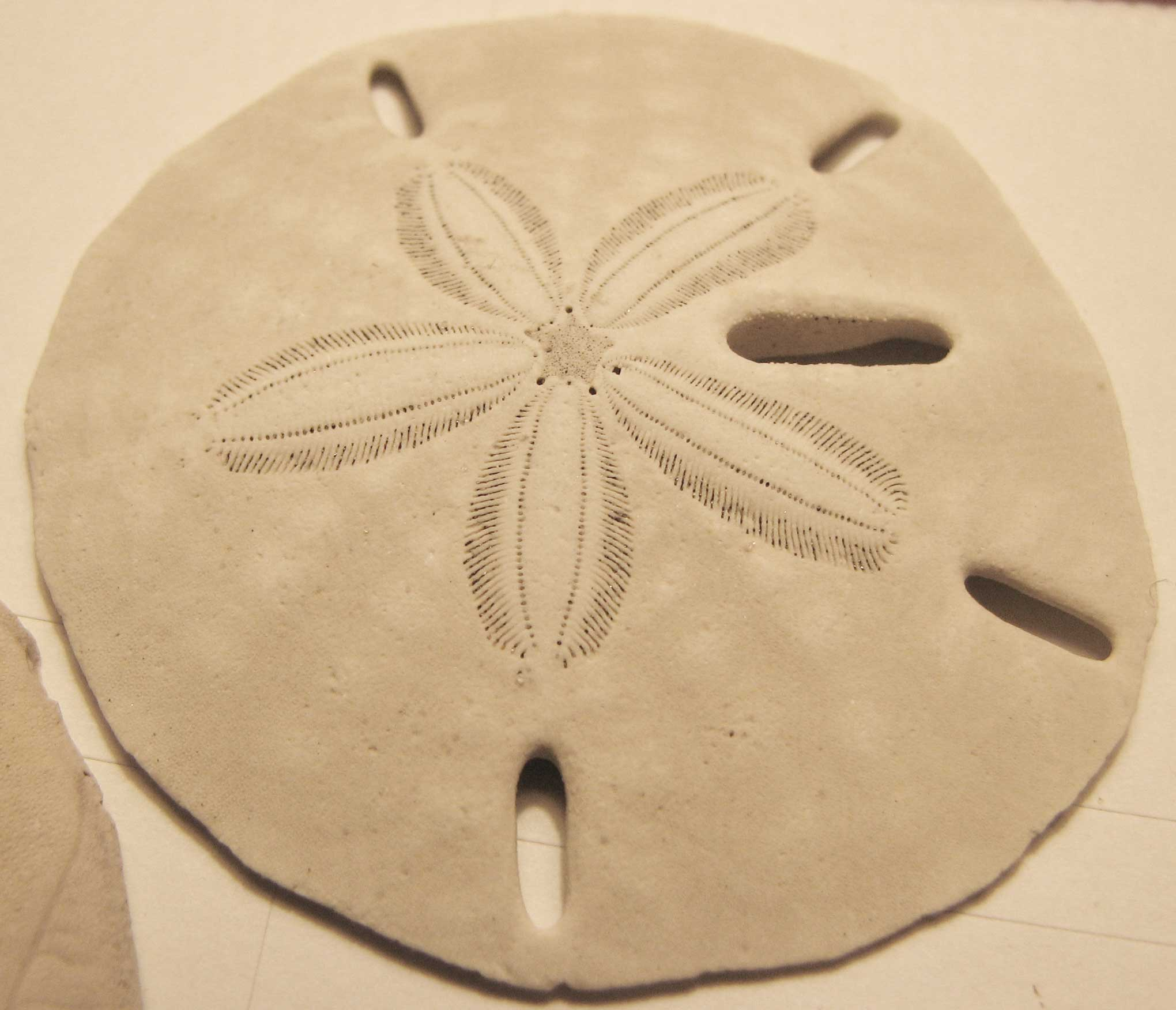
Mellita quinquiesperforata.

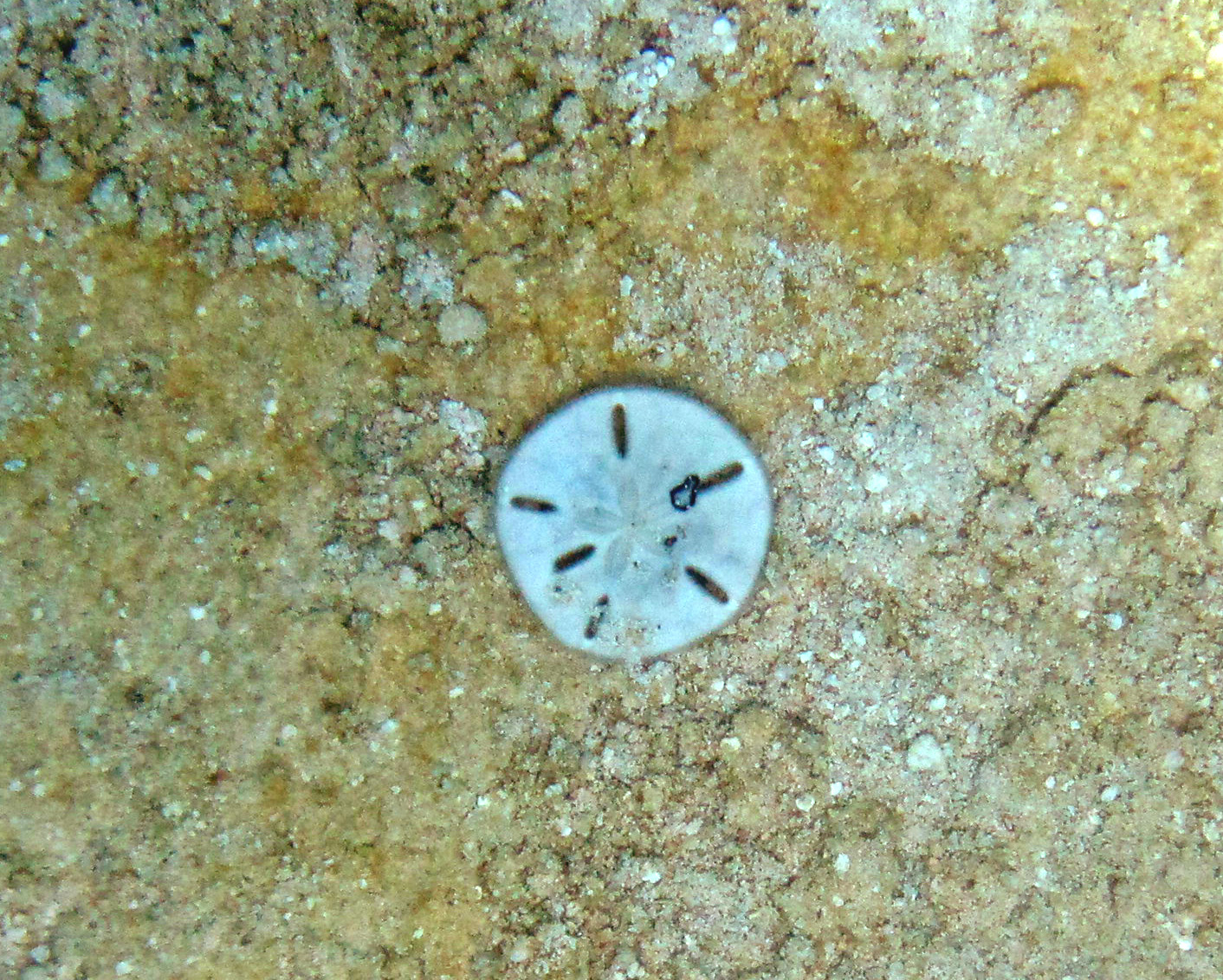
Leodia sexiesperforata

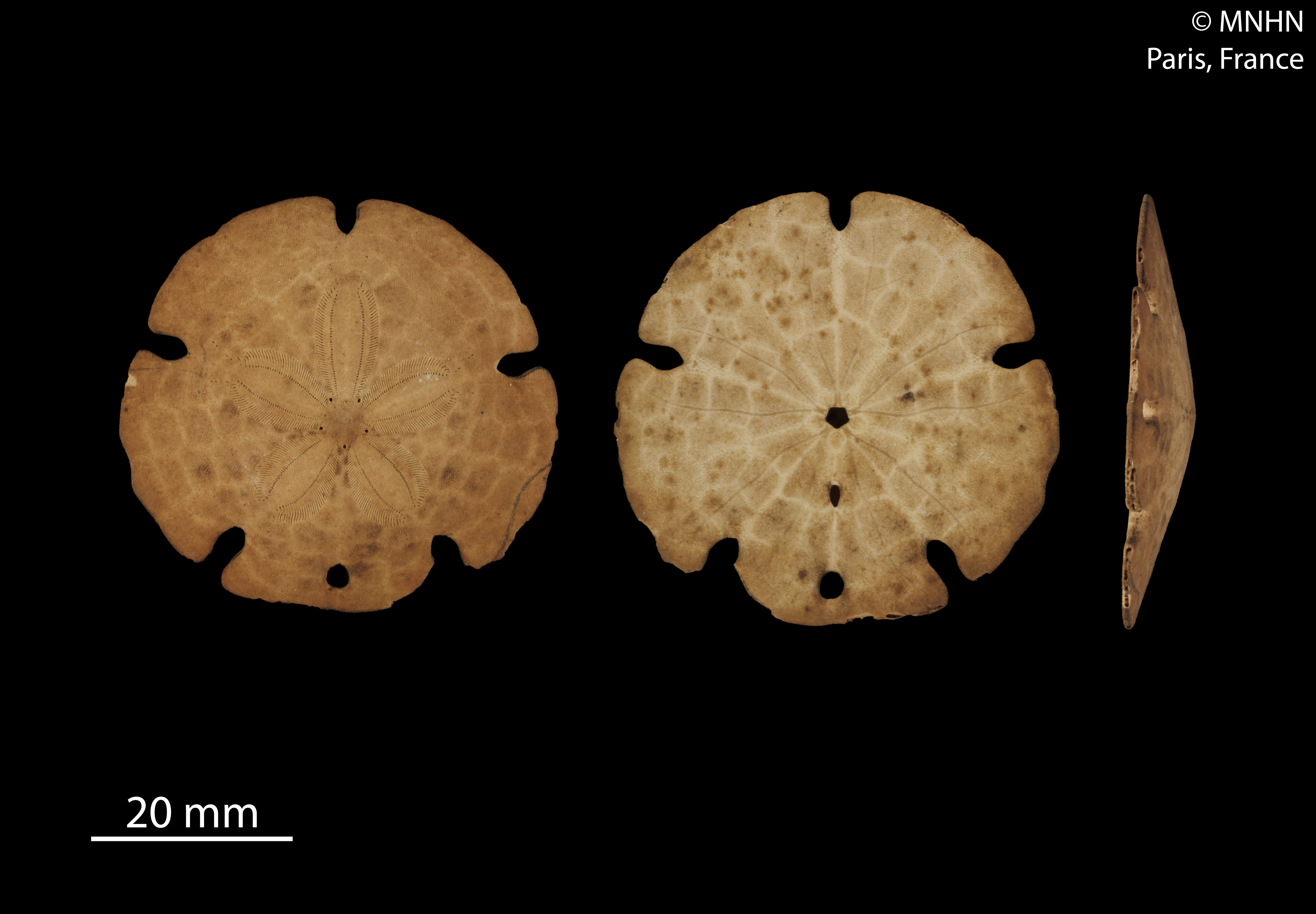
Mellitella stokesii (MNHN)
