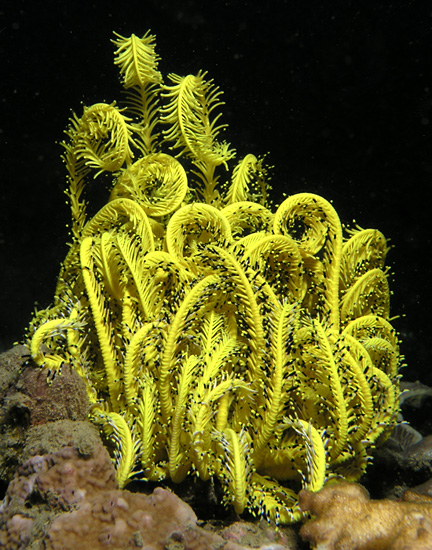
- The variable bushy feather star (Comaster schlegelii)

Scientific classification
- Kingdom: Animalia
- Phylum: Echinodermata
- Class: Crinoidea
- Order: Comatulida
- Family: Comasteridae; A. H. Clark, 1908

Genera
- See text

= Comasteridae =

Family of crinoids

Comasteridae is a family of crinoids.

This family is now considered obsolete, having been replaced by the family Comatulidae since 2015.

== Description and characteristics ==
Members of this family are characterized by possession of one or paired blade-like or knob-like projections on a few to many of the outer segments of the oral pinnules (the side branches closest to the base of the arms) that together form structures called combs. In adults of most species, the mouth is offset from the center of the oral surface, often near the margin, and the anus lies centrally. In some, mouth and anus are both offset, while in a few, the mouth lies centrally and the anus is displaced, the arrangement in other crinoids. Comasterids are also unique among feather stars in other respects: some species in several genera have the centrodorsal, the aboral skeletal plate, reduced and bearing few or no anchoring hook-like cirri; whereas all other feather stars have symmetrical rays, many reef-dwelling species that live semi-cryptically exhibit a secondary bilateral symmetry in addition to the displaced mouth; arms that arise on one or more rays on the side closest to the mouth are longer than those on the other side. They are the ones that extend from the protective crevice and are the primary food collecting structures. Shorter arms opposite the long ones often have better developed gonads and may even lack food-collecting ambulacral grooves. Although a few species occur at depths exceeding 600 m, most comasterids are found in less than 100 m and constitute the great majority of reef-dwelling species in both the tropical Western Atlantic and Indo-Western Pacific regions.

== List of genus before renaming of the family ==
This family has been moved to Comatulidae in 2015. Before that, it contained the following genera:

Subfamily Capillasterinae

- Capillaster AH Clark, 1909
- Davidaster Hoggett & Rowe, 1986
- Nemaster AH Clark, 1909

Subfamily Comasterinae

- Cenolia AH Clark, 1916
- Clarkcomanthus Rowe, Hoggett, Birtles & Vail, 1986
- Comanthus AH Clark, 1908
- Comaster L. Agassiz, 1836
- Oxycomanthus Rowe, Hoggett, Birtles & Vail, 1986

Subfamily Comatulinae

- Comatula Lamarck, 1816

Subfamily Phanogeniinae

- Alloeocomatella Messing, 1995
- Aphanocomaster Messing, 1995
- Comatella AH Clark, 1908
- Neocomatella AHClark, 1909
- Palaeocomatella AHClark, 1912
- Phanogenia Lovén, 1866
