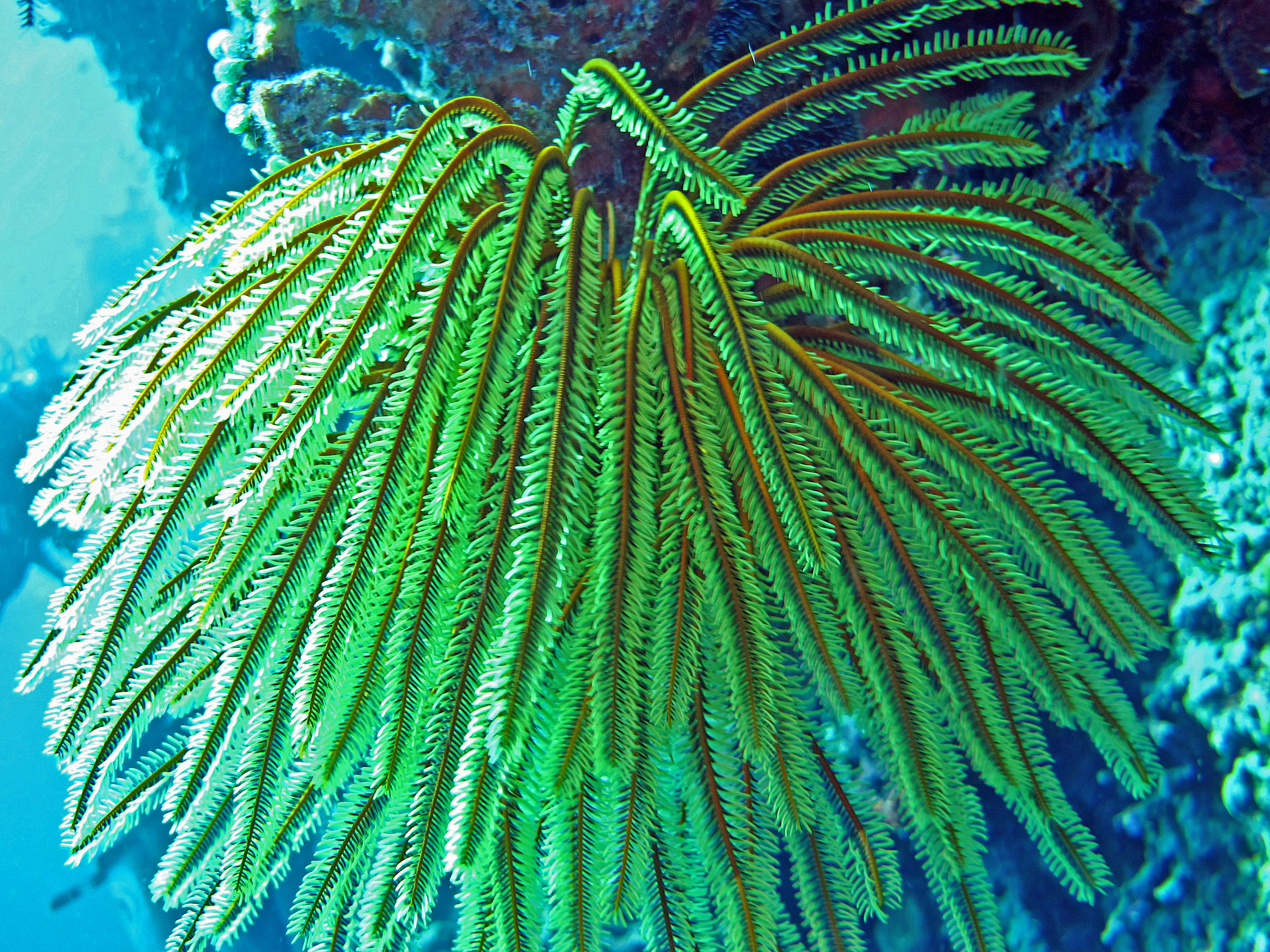
- Oxycomanthus bennetti in Philippines

Scientific classification
- Kingdom: Animalia
- Phylum: Echinodermata
- Class: Crinoidea
- Superorder: Articulata
- Order: Comatulida
- Family: Comatulidae
- Genus: Oxycomanthus; Rowe, Hoggett, Birtles & Vail, 1986

= Oxycomanthus =

Genus of crinoids

Oxycomanthus is a genus of crinoids belonging to the family Comatulidae.

== Species ==
- Oxycomanthus bennetti (Müller, 1841)
- Oxycomanthus comanthipinna (Gislén, 1922)
- Oxycomanthus exilis Rowe, Hoggett, Birtles & Vail, 1986
- Oxycomanthus grandicalyx (Carpenter, 1882)
- Oxycomanthus intermedius (AH Clark, 1916)
- Oxycomanthus japonicus (Müller, 1841)
- Oxycomanthus mirus Rowe, Hoggett, Birtles & Vail, 1986
- Oxycomanthus muelleri Rowe, Hoggett, Birtles & Vail, 1986
- Oxycomanthus perplexum (HL Clark, 1916)
- Oxycomanthus pinguis (AH Clark, 1909)
- Oxycomanthus plectrophorum (HL Clark, 1916)
- Oxycomanthus solaster (AH Clark, 1907)
