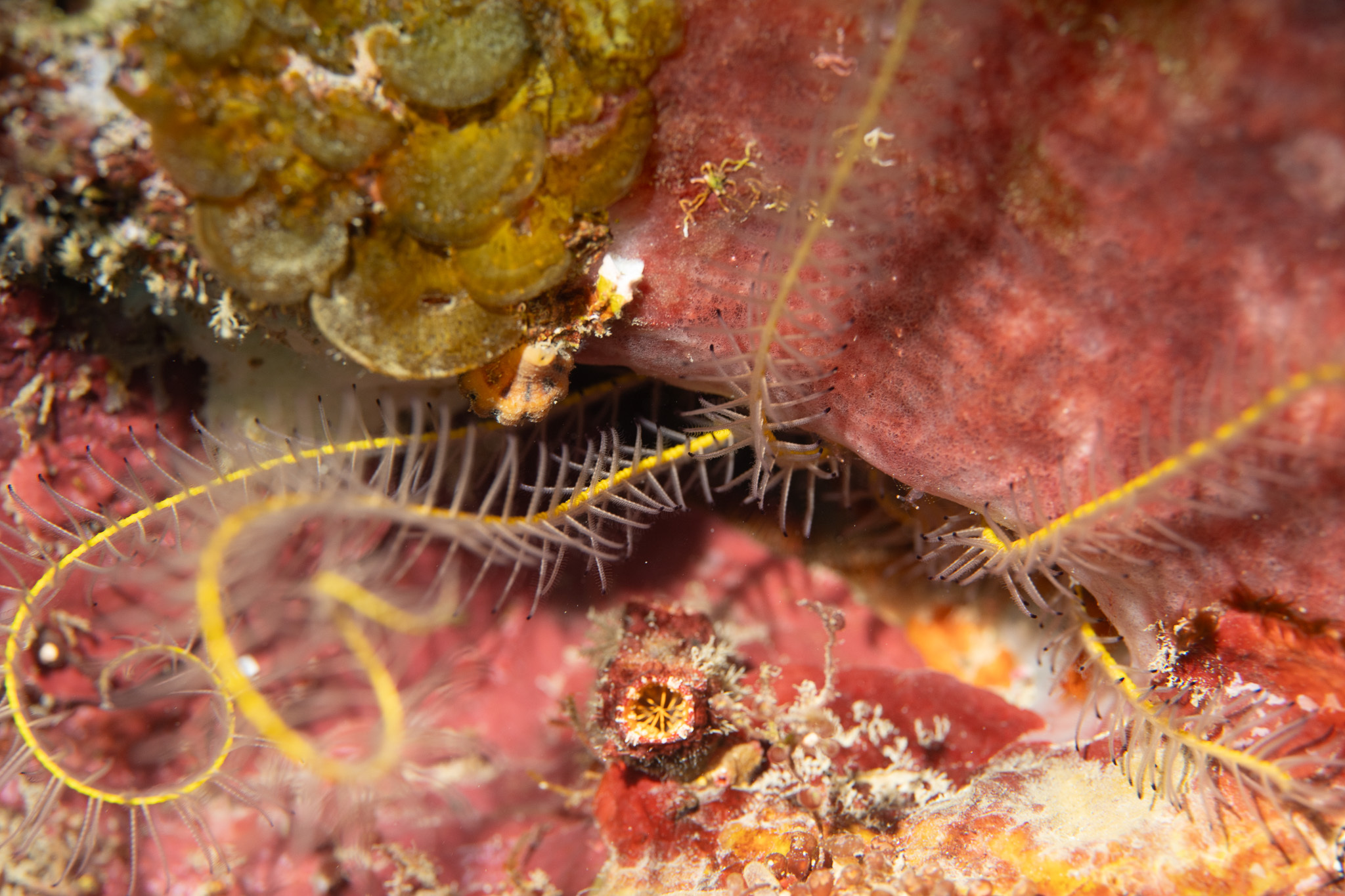

Scientific classification
- Kingdom: Animalia
- Phylum: Echinodermata
- Class: Crinoidea
- Superorder: Articulata
- Order: Comatulida
- Family: Comatulidae
- Genus: Davidaster
- Species: D. discoideus

Binomial name
- Davidaster discoideus (Carpenter, 1888)

Synonyms
- Actinometra discoidea Carpenter, 1888; Davidaster discoidea (Carpenter, 1888); Nemaster discoidea (Carpenter, 1888); Nemaster insolitus AH Clark, 1917

= Davidaster discoideus =

Species of crinoid

Davidaster discoideus, the beaded crinoid, is a species of feather star in the family Comatulidae. It is found on reefs in the Caribbean Sea and northern coast of South America.

== Description ==
The beaded crinoid has a cup shaped body, usually hidden from sight, from which about twenty arms project. Only a few of these are usually visible at one time and each can be curled up in a coil. Short pinnules extend from either side of the arms like vanes on a feather. Both the arms and the pinnules are formed from a large number of jointed plates which gives them great overall flexibility. There is an ambulacral groove along the oral surface of each pinnule which is continuous with grooves on the arms. These are linked to grooves leading to the mouth forming feeding channels. The grooves have flap-like lappets overhanging them. At each plate junction on the pinnules there are three tube feet of different length used in food capture and manipulation. The arms can be 20 centimetres (7.9 in) long and are the only part of the crinoid normally visible as its body is generally concealed in a crevice or inside a sponge. At the base of the crinoid are several cirri, unbranched appendages with which it grips the rock or other substrate. The arms are orange or red and the pinnules are grey or banded in black and white and have a beaded appearance.

== Distribution and habitat ==
The beaded crinoid is found in the Caribbean Sea and the Gulf of Mexico. It is found at depths between 15 and 40 metres (49 and 131 ft) and is generally uncommon. These crinoids often live in the same concealed spot for several years and should not be moved by divers as they are very sensitive to changes in water temperature and illumination.

== Biology ==
The beaded crinoid extends its arms and pinnules in slow flowing water. The longest tube feet on the pinnules trap planktonic particles and push them into the ambulacral groove. They are prevented from leaving this by the remaining tube feet and the lappets. Cilia lining the groove form particles into boluses and move these along to the mouth. The beaded crinoid can sometimes be seen "walking" across the seabed on its arms.
