= Comaster meyerensis =

Scientific classification
- Kingdom: Animalia
- Phylum: Echinodermata
- Class: Crinoidea
- Superorder: Articulata
- Order: Comatulida
- Family: Comatulidae
- Genus: Comaster
- Species: †C. meyerensis

Binomial name
- †Comaster meyerensis Eagle, 2008

Extinct genus of gastropods

Comaster meyerensis is an extinct species of crinoid in the family Comatulidae. The species is known from fossils found in New Zealand, dating to the Late Oligocene, and is the currently oldest known member of the genus Comaster.

== Description ==
Comaster meyerensis has a discoidal, reduced centrodorsal and overhanging radials, with 2-3 circlets of cirrus sockets and a trapezoidal surface. It can be differentiated from other members of the Comaster genus due to deep sub-elliptical dorsal ligament fossae, a rounded triangular interarticular ligament, rounded ventral muscular fossae, the adradial face having a low inclination angle, and by the fossils being more ovoid than circular.

== Taxonomy ==
The genus was first described by Michael K. Eagle in 2008, based on fossils found in Late Oligocene formations in New Zealand, including the Meyers Pass Limestone Member. C. meyerensis extends the fossil range for Comaster, which previously was first known to occur in Miocene fossils found in Europe. A paratype of the species is held at the Auckland War Memorial Museum.

The species epithet meyerensis refers to Meyers Pass, the location where the species holotype was discovered.
