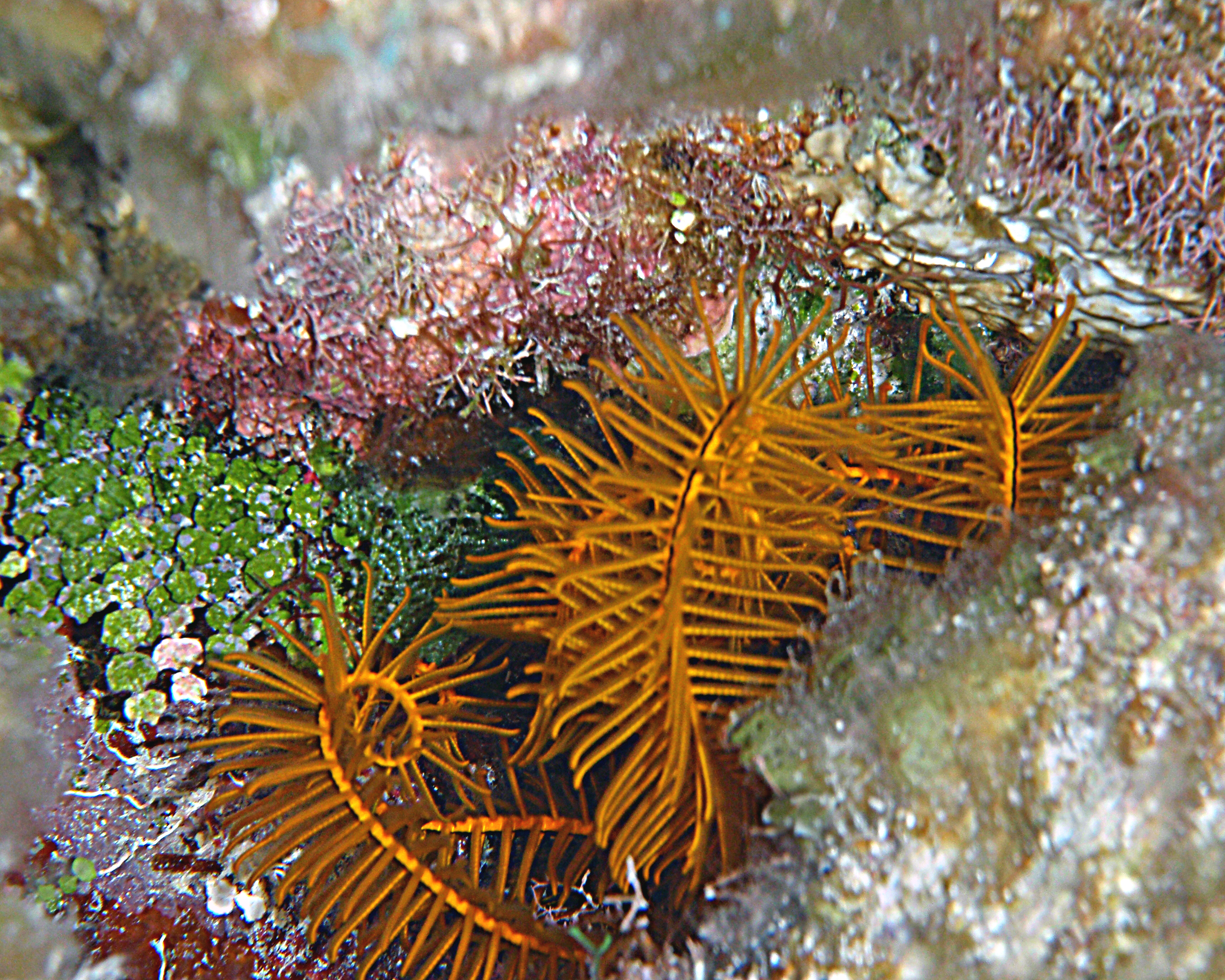

Scientific classification
- Kingdom: Animalia
- Phylum: Echinodermata
- Class: Crinoidea
- Order: Comatulida
- Family: Comatulidae
- Genus: Davidaster
- Species: D. rubiginosus

Binomial name
- Davidaster rubiginosus (Pourtalès, 1869)

Synonyms
- Actinometra lineata Carpenter, 1880; Actinometra rubiginosa (Pourtalès, 1869); Antedon rubiginosa Pourtalès, 1869; Davidaster rubiginosa (Pourtalès, 1869); Nemaster iowensis Springer, 1902; Nemaster lineata (Carpenter, 1880); Nemaster mexicanensis Tommasi, 1966; Nemaster rubiginosa (Pourtalès, 1869)

= Davidaster rubiginosus =

Species of crinoid

Davidaster rubiginosus, the orange sea lily, is a species of crinoid in the family Comatulidae. At one time it was classified as Nemaster rubiginosa but the World Register of Marine Species has determined that the valid name is Davidaster rubiginosus. It is found on reefs in the tropical western Atlantic and the Caribbean Sea.

== Description ==
The orange sea lily is a stalkless crinoid. It has twenty to thirty five arms 10 to 20 centimetres (3.9 to 7.9 in) long radiating from the calyx, a cup-like body with a lid, the tegmen. Each arm is feather-like and has many pinnules projecting alternately from one side and the other. These have an ambulacral groove on the oral surface which is continuous with the groove on the arm. The arms are usually orange with yellow curved up tips but there is some variation in colour and they are sometimes white with black tips. The grooves are black. The arms and pinnules are composed of a series of jointed plates and there are three tube feet at each junction. The tube feet produce strands of mucus which trap plankton. Food particles are passed along the grooves by cilia to the mouth which is at the centre of the tegmen.

== Distribution and habitat ==
The orange sea lily is found on reefs at depths of between 10 and 30 metres (33 and 98 ft). Its range includes Florida, the Caribbean Sea, the Gulf of Mexico and the Bahamas southwards to the coast of Brazil. In the daytime it usually keeps its body hidden in a crevice, under coral or inside a sponge, with several of its arms extended to filter feed. In strong currents or heavy seas, it stops feeding and retracts all its arms. At night it emerges from its hiding place and may be found poised on top of a coral or sea fan with its arms extended to feed.

== Reproduction ==
In a study in Jamaica, it was found that, unlike many tropical crinoids, the orange sea lily has a regular annual breeding cycle involving the release into the sea of gametes in the late autumn and winter. After fertilisation the eggs hatch into barrel-shaped vitellaria larva with several rings of cilia. These do not feed and after a few days settle on the seabed and undergo metamorphosis into juvenile sea lilies.
