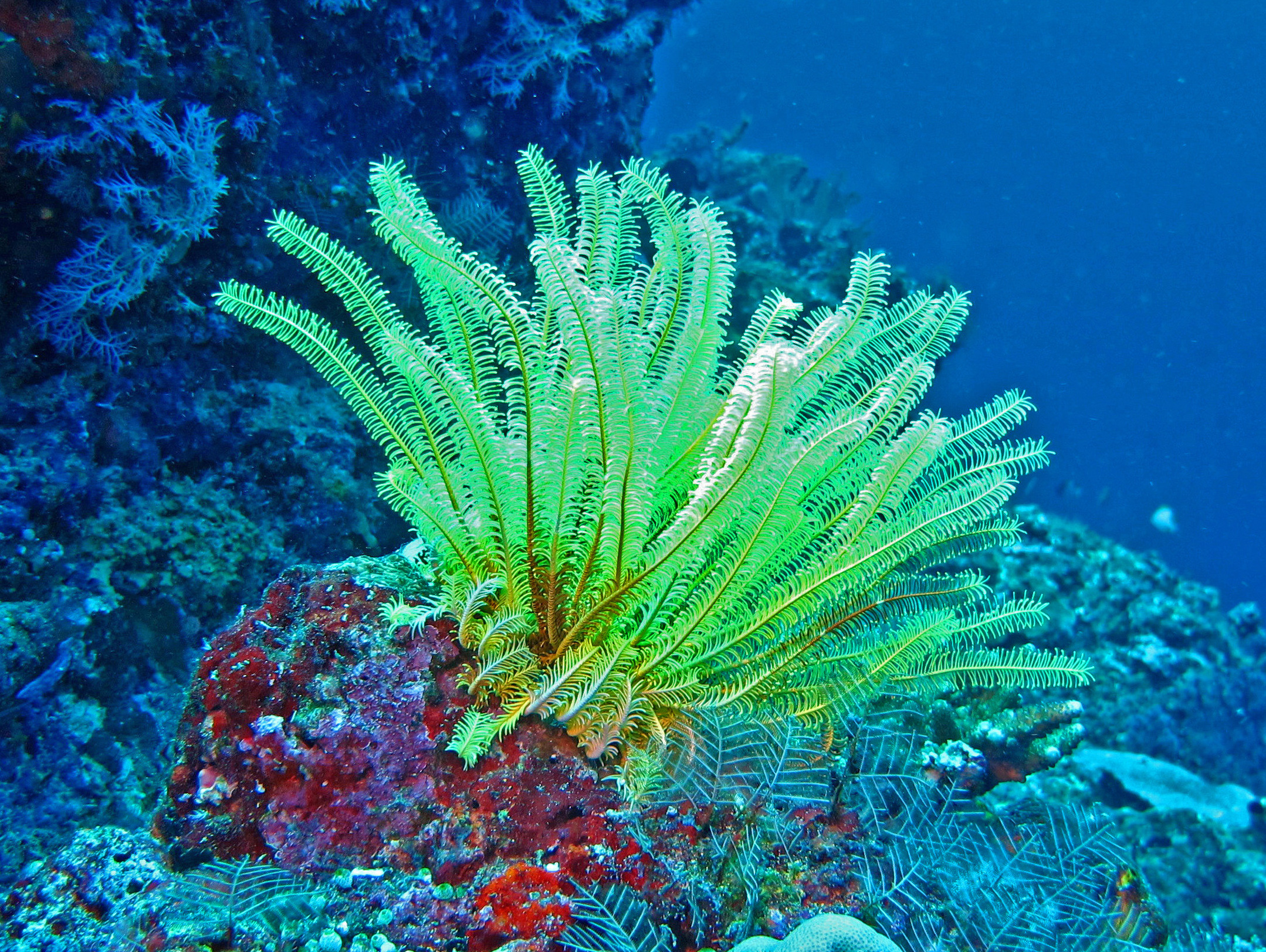
- Comaster nobilis in Sulawesi, Indonesia

Scientific classification
- Kingdom: Animalia
- Phylum: Echinodermata
- Class: Crinoidea
- Superorder: Articulata
- Order: Comatulida
- Family: Comatulidae
- Genus: Comaster
- Species: C. nobilis

Binomial name
- Comaster nobilis (Carpenter, 1884)

Synonyms
- Actinometra duplex Carpenter, 1888; Actinometra dissimilis Carpenter, 1884; Actinometra nobilis Carpenter, 1884; Comanthina nobilis (Carpenter, 1884)

= Comaster nobilis =

Species of crinoid

Comaster nobilis, the noble feather star or yellow feather star, is a crinoid in the family Comatulidae. It was previously classified as Comanthina nobilis but further research showed that it was better placed in the genus Comaster.

== Description ==
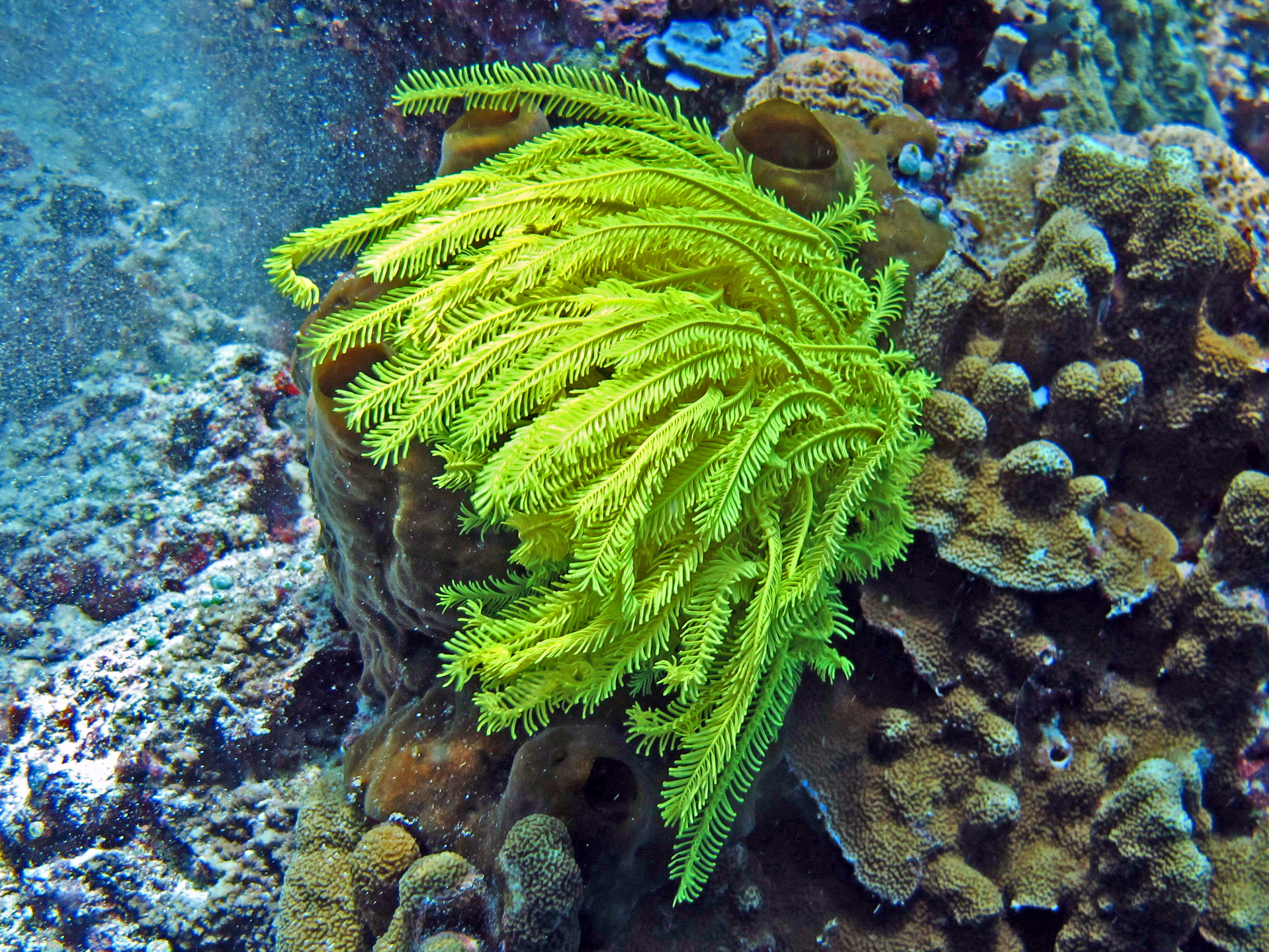
Comaster nobilis in Sulawesi, Indonesia

Comaster nobilis can reach a diameter of about 40 cm (16 in). It has a cup-shaped body with 35-40 arms, extended out from the central disc. This species may occur in a number of colour variations. Usually it has yellow arms, sometimes with some black or green and white on the under surface close to the centre. It feeds on detritus, phytoplankton and zooplankton. The larvae of this feather star swim freely with plankton for a few weeks, then they settle down growing into a stalked form. Mature specimen break the stalk becoming free-living.

== Distribution ==
This species is widespread in the Indo-Pacific, from Coral Sea and Great Barrier Reef up to Indonesia, Malaysia, New Caledonia and Philippines.

== Habitat ==
It is found on hard or soft corals in shallow water reefs, at a depth of 10 – 50 m.
