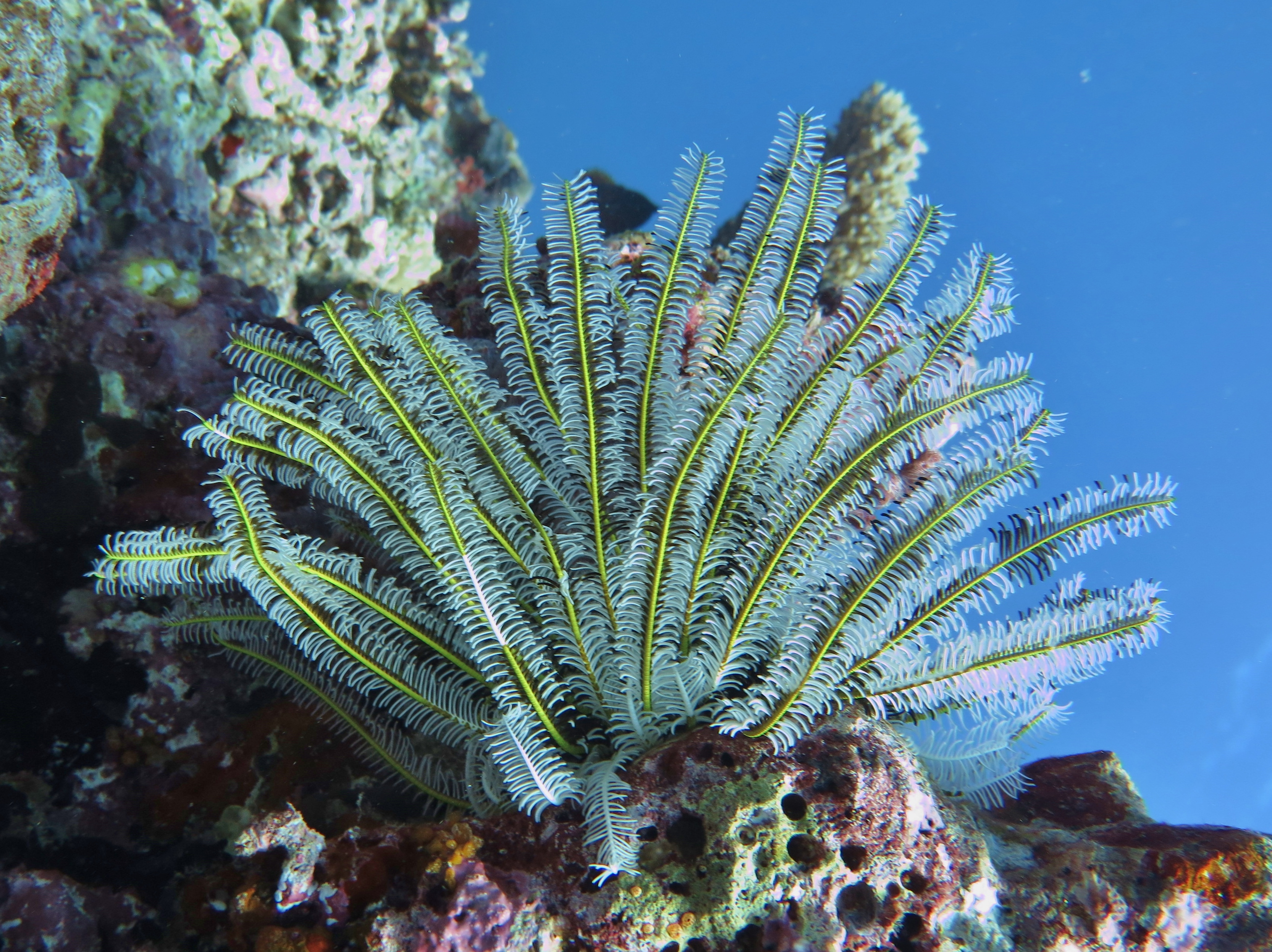

Scientific classification
- Kingdom: Animalia
- Phylum: Echinodermata
- Class: Crinoidea
- Superorder: Articulata
- Order: Comatulida
- Family: Comatulidae
- Genus: Comaster
- Species: C. schlegelii

Binomial name
- Comaster schlegelii (Carpenter, 1881)

Synonyms
- Actinometra duplex Carpenter, 1888; Actinometra regalis Carpenter, 1888; Actinometra schlegelii Carpenter, 1881; Comanthina schlegelii (Carpenter, 1881); Comanthus callipeplum HL Clark, 1915

= Comaster schlegelii =

Species of crinoid

Comaster schlegelii, the variable bushy feather star, is a crinoid in the family Comatulidae. It was previously classified as Comanthina schlegeli but further research showed that it was better placed in the genus Comaster. It is found on shallow water reefs in the western Pacific Ocean.

== Description ==
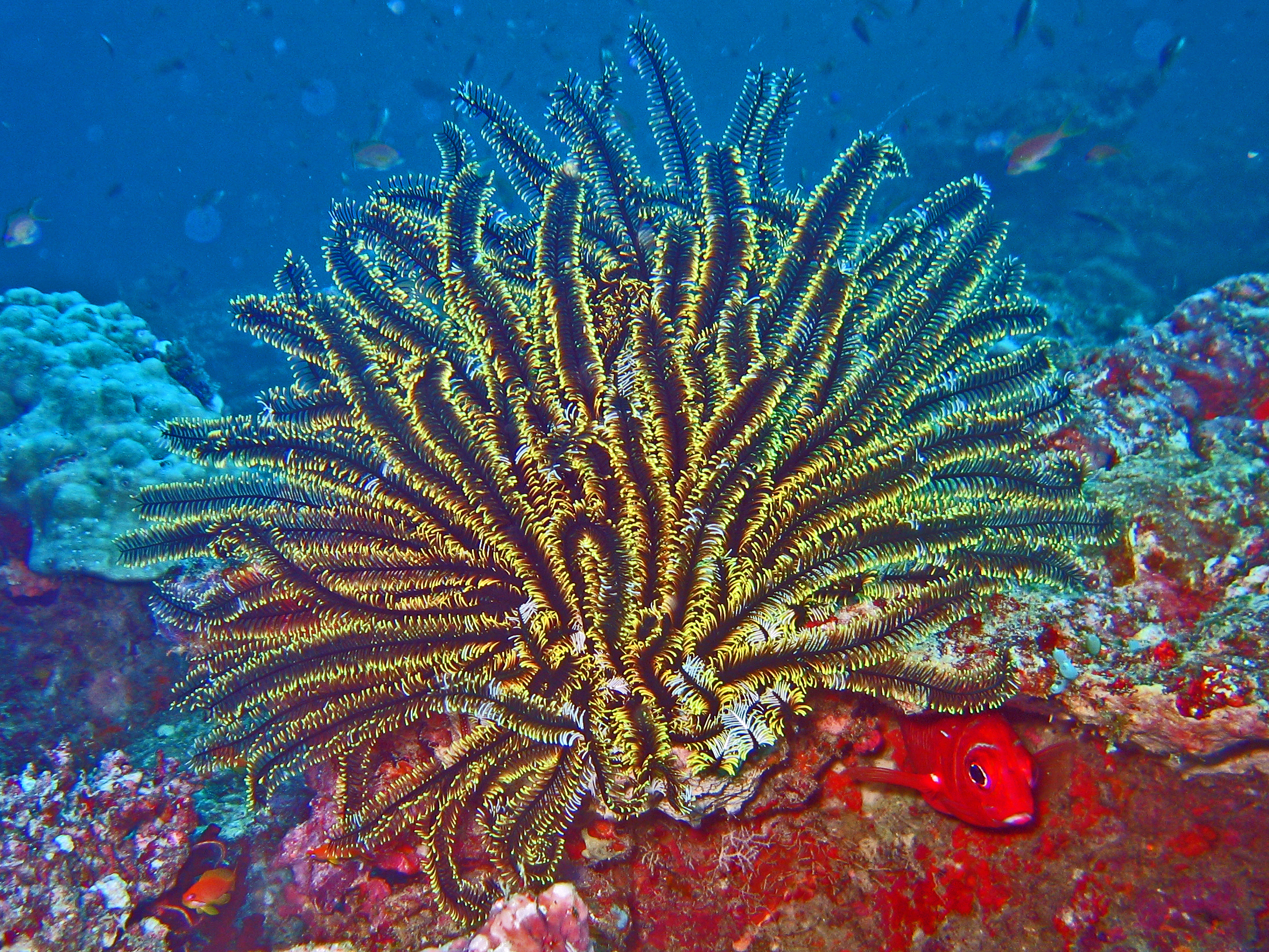
Comaster schlegelii in Maldives.

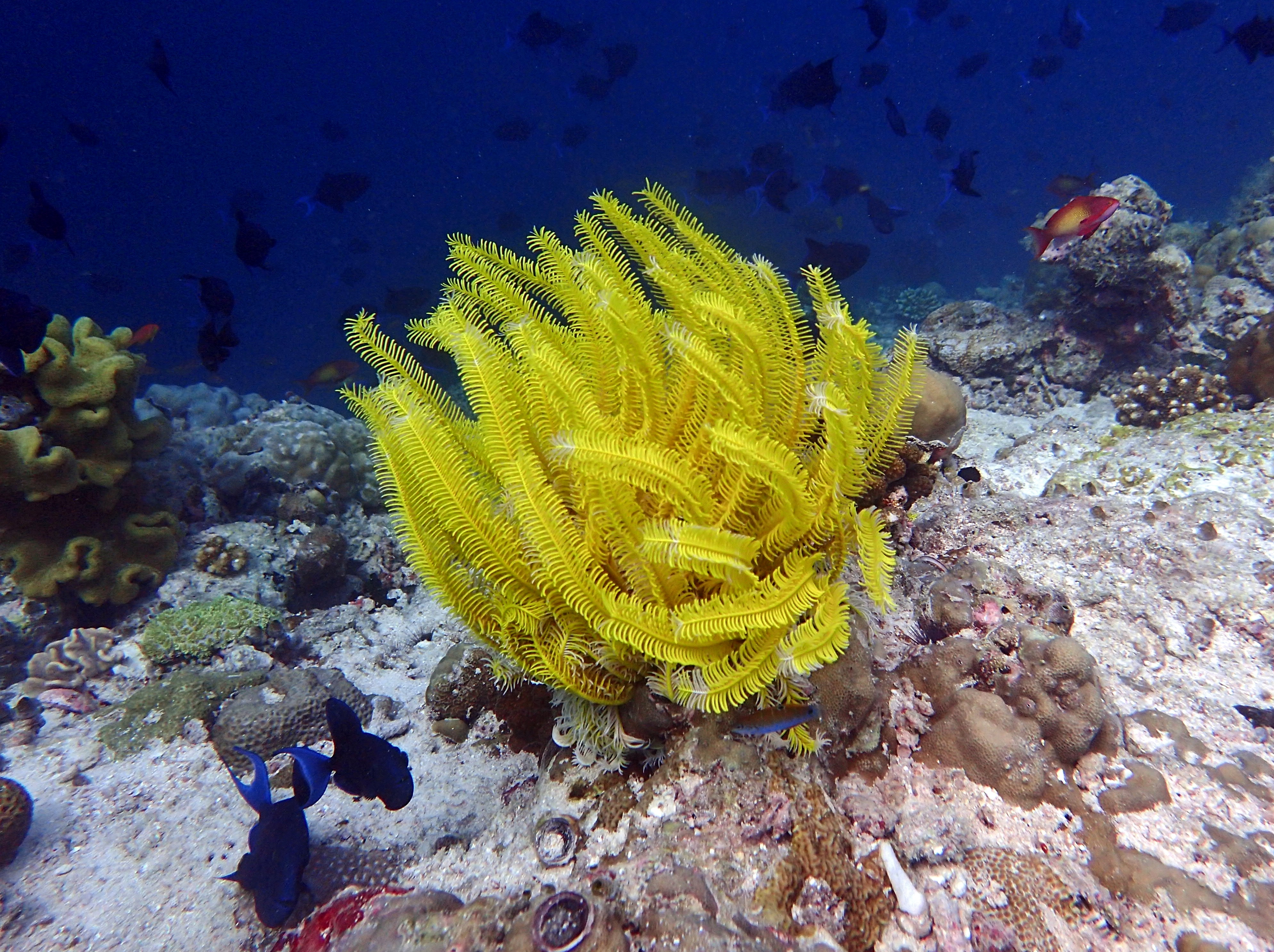
In the Indian Ocean (Maldives, Sri Lanka, Andaman), entirely yellow morphs have long been called Comaster nobilis, but are not genetically distinct from Comaster schlegelii.

The variable bushy feather star often keeps its body concealed in a crevice and the only visible part is its array of arms, especially when it is young. There are in fact five rays attached to the upper part of the body but these subdivide into a number of arms and when one of these is lost, two grow in its place. The arms are flexible, being formed from many jointed calcareous small plates known as ossicles, and can be coiled up. On either side of each arm are short side branches known as pinnules. On the underside of the body are about twenty clawlike appendages known as cirri which are used to cling on to the underlying surface, but they are lost in older specimens, which attach directly using the underarms. The colour is very variable, some specimens being plain golden yellow, pale brown or black and others being multicoloured, often green with bands of orange, white and black on the arms and pinnules.

== Distribution and habitat ==
The variable bushy feather star is found in shallow waters in the Indo-Pacific. Its range includes Indonesia, Fiji and Japan, the Maldives and Papua New Guinea. It is most common on reef crests down to a depth of about 5 metres (16 ft).

== Biology ==
Like other feather stars, the variable bushy feather star is a suspension feeder and spreads out its arms and pinnules to feed. Plankton or other organic particles that drift past are caught by tube feet on the pinnules and passed to the mouth down ciliated grooves.

Feather stars are dioecious, each individual being either male or female. The gametes are produced in specialised pinnules on the arms and fertilisation is external. The larvae drift with the plankton and pass through several developmental stages before settling on the seabed and anchoring themselves with a stalk. After metamorphosis the stalk remains intact at first but later breaks and the juvenile feather star can move around independently.

The variable bushy feather star is sometimes sold for display in reef aquaria, however it is not easy to meet its food requirements and most aquarium specimens sooner or later die of starvation. It can be fed with brine shrimp larvae, copepods and diatoms after turning off the particulate filter on the tank.
