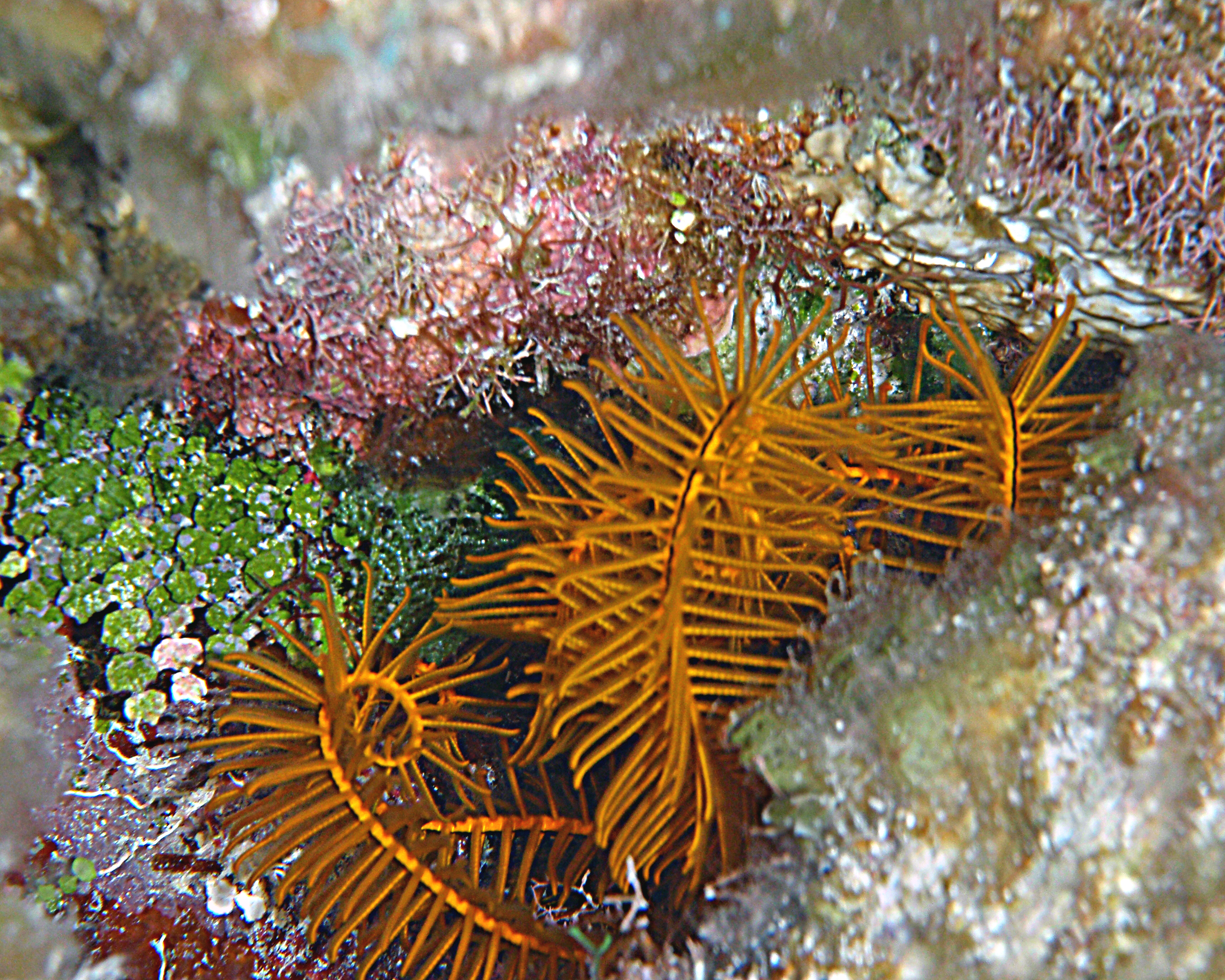

Scientific classification
- Kingdom: Animalia
- Phylum: Echinodermata
- Class: Crinoidea
- Superorder: Articulata
- Order: Comatulida
- Family: Comatulidae
- Subfamily: Comatellinae
- Genus: Davidaster; Hoggett & Rowe, 1986

Species
- See text

= Davidaster =

Genus of crinoids

Davidaster is a genus of crinoids. According to the World Register of Marine Species, a number of species that originally were included in the genus Nemaster are now included in Davidaster. Members of this genus have wedge-shaped arms, except for the basal ones, often longer than they are wide. The mouth is off centre and there are no pinnule combs after pinnule 3. The primary comb has the teeth widely separated and confluent with the lateral edge of the segment.

== Species ==
- Species Davidaster discoideus (Carpenter, 1888)

synonyms Nemaster discoidea (Carpenter, 1888)

Nemaster insolitus AH Clark, 1917

- Species Davidaster rubiginosus (Pourtalès, 1869)

synonyms Nemaster iowensis Springer, 1902

Nemaster lineata (Carpenter, 1880)
Nemaster mexicanensis Tommasi, 1966
Nemaster rubiginosa (Pourtalès, 1869)
