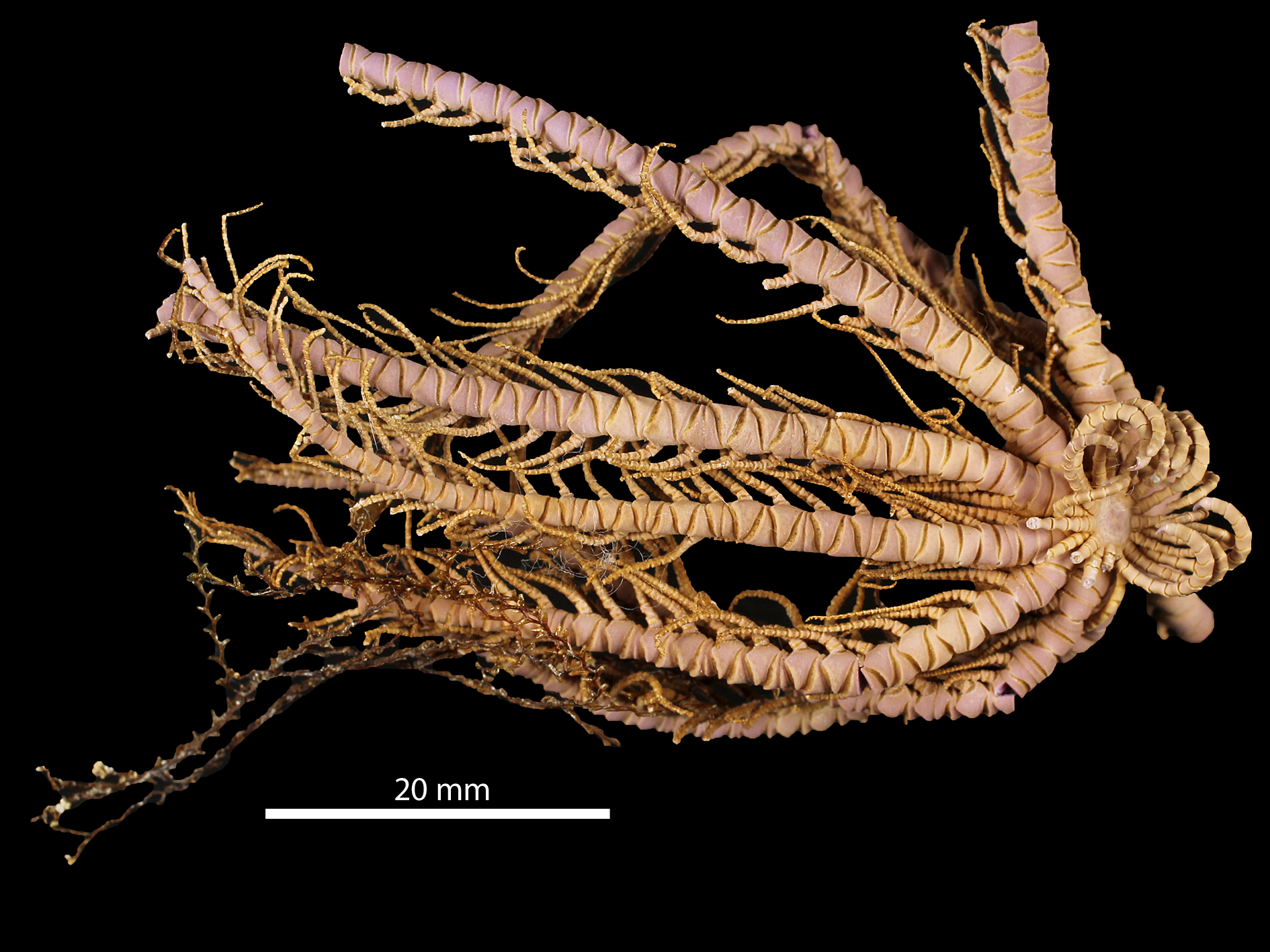
- Comactinia titan

Scientific classification
- Domain: Eukaryota
- Kingdom: Animalia
- Phylum: Echinodermata
- Class: Crinoidea
- Order: Comatulida
- Family: Comatulidae
- Subfamily: Comatulinae
- Tribe: Comatulini
- Genus: Comactinia; A. H. Clark, 1909

Species
- Comactinia echinoptera Comactinia meridionalis Comactinia titan

= Comactinia =

Genus of crinoids

Comactinia is a genus of crinoids, characteristically with 10 arms, belonging to the family Comatulidae. There are three described species, two from the western Atlantic and one, Comactinia titan, recently described from the western Pacific.
