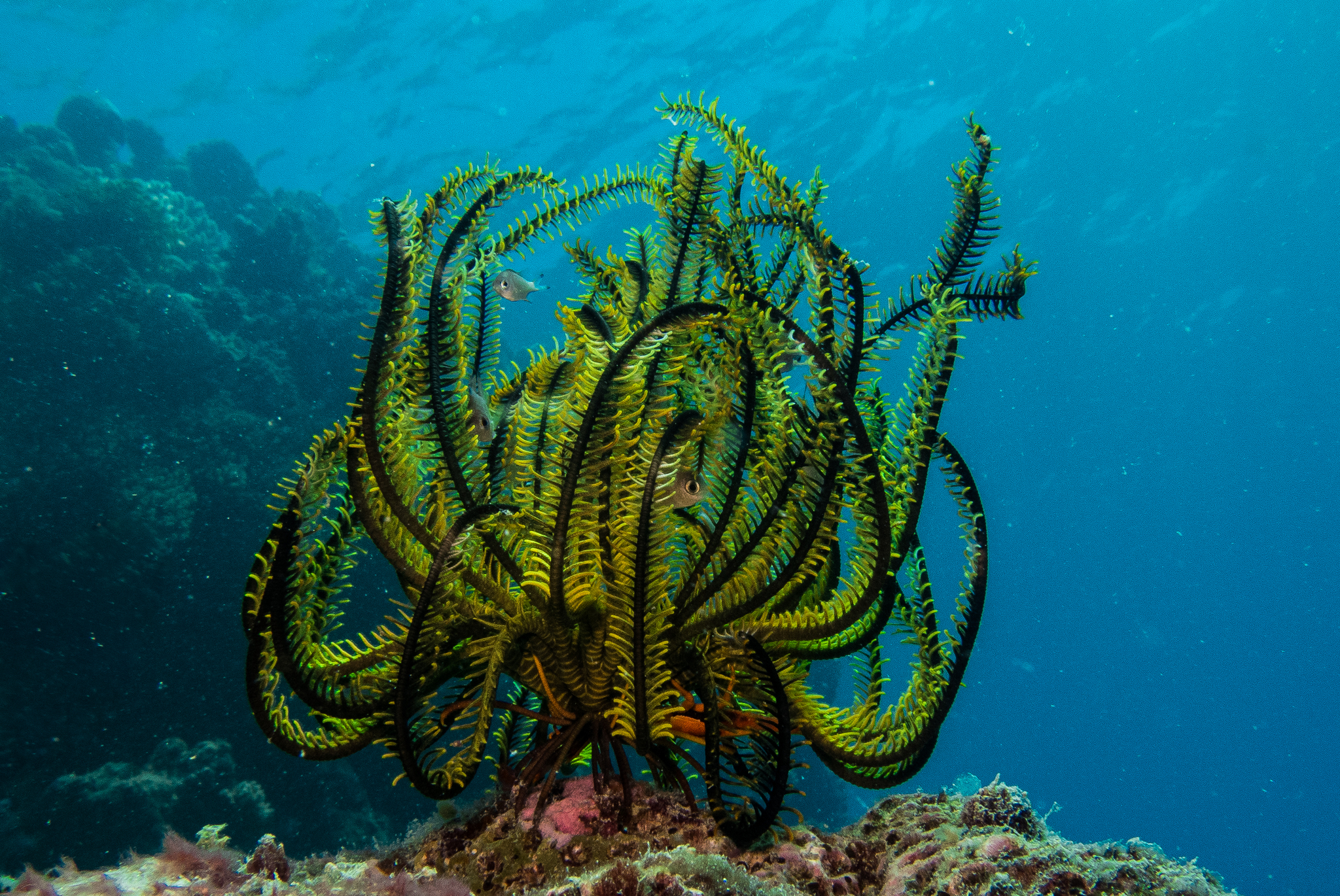

Scientific classification
- Kingdom: Animalia
- Phylum: Echinodermata
- Class: Crinoidea
- Superorder: Articulata
- Order: Comatulida
- Family: Comatulidae
- Genus: Anneissia
- Species: A. bennetti

Binomial name
- Anneissia bennetti (Müller, 1841)

Synonyms
- Actinometra bennetti (Müller, 1841); Actinometra brachymera Schmeltz, 1877; Alecto bennetti Müller, 1841; Oxycomanthus bennetti (Müller, 1841); Cenolia bennetti (Müller, 1841); Comanthus (Cenolia) bennetti (Müller, 1841); Comanthus (Comanthus) bennetti (Müller, 1841); Comanthus bennetti (Müller, 1841)

= Anneissia bennetti =

Species of echinoderm

Anneissia bennetti, the Bennett's feather star, is a species of crinoid belonging to the family Comatulidae. It is found in shallow water in the Indo-Pacific between northern Australia and southeast Asia.

== Description ==
Anneissia bennetti is one of the larger species of Comatulidae, growing up to 30 cm. It is a filter-feeder, meaning it does not hunt down food, it captures food suspended in the water column to eat. It does this with 31–120 feathery arms, usually held up into the water in order to trap food, feeding on detritus, phytoplankton and zooplankton. The arms have numerous finger-like appendages known as pinnules, in order to increase the surface area on which food can be trapped. The mouth is on the upper side of the large, thick body, otherwise known as the centrodorsal. Attached to the centrodorsal are many long, robust cirri (3–4.5 cm). These cirri are used by A. bennetti to hold on to substrate in the beginning portion of their lives, after the larvae settle out of the water column. They begin their lives attached to a stalk, held onto a substrate by cirri, and once mature, they can break the stalk and become free-living. Once they are free-living, however, they still use these cirri to elevate themselves to put themselves in a better position to trap food. Because these cirri are so long and robust, the posture of A. bennetti can be used to easily distinguish it from other similar species. A. bennetti is diurnally active, meaning it is active during the day, unlike many other species of crinoids. The color of this species is quite variable, ranging from yellow to brown and purple. The tips of the pinnules are often more brightly colored than the arms and centrodorsal.

== Distribution and habitat ==
Anneissia bennetti is widespread in the Indo-West Pacific, from Bay of Bengal and Maldives to the Marshall Islands and from China to Australia, Bali and Indonesia. It is most commonly found between 5 and 25 meters depth, but there is a less common deep water variety that lives between 15 and 45 meters depth. A. bennetti prefers to inhabit exposed coral heads, and is rheophilic, meaning it prefers to live where currents flow more strongly. This positioning ensures that more food floats past the star, therefore increasing nutrient uptake.

== Biology and symbiosis ==
A. bennetti is gonochoric, meaning it has both female and male individuals. Reproduction occurs when some of the pinnules burst, releasing gametes into the water column. Sperm will fertilize eggs, which will hatch to produce free-swimming larvae. These larvae settle after a few days, where they begin to produce their stalk and start to grow. A. bennetti has been observed having a symbiotic relationship with various species of polychaete worms. This relationship has been described as commensalistic, meaning that the polychaete worms benefit greatly from the feather star, as it provides shelter, protection, and food, and there is little to no negative effect on A. bennetti. Individuals of the species Hololepidella laingensis and Paradyte crinoidicola have been found on A. bennetti in Papua New Guinea, with an average of 2–4 worms per individual star, as competition between these worms is fierce. In Vietnam, these stars were found with a total of 11 symbiont species on only 18 individuals, meaning that these feather stars serve as excellent shelters for smaller animals looking for protection and food.

== Gallery ==
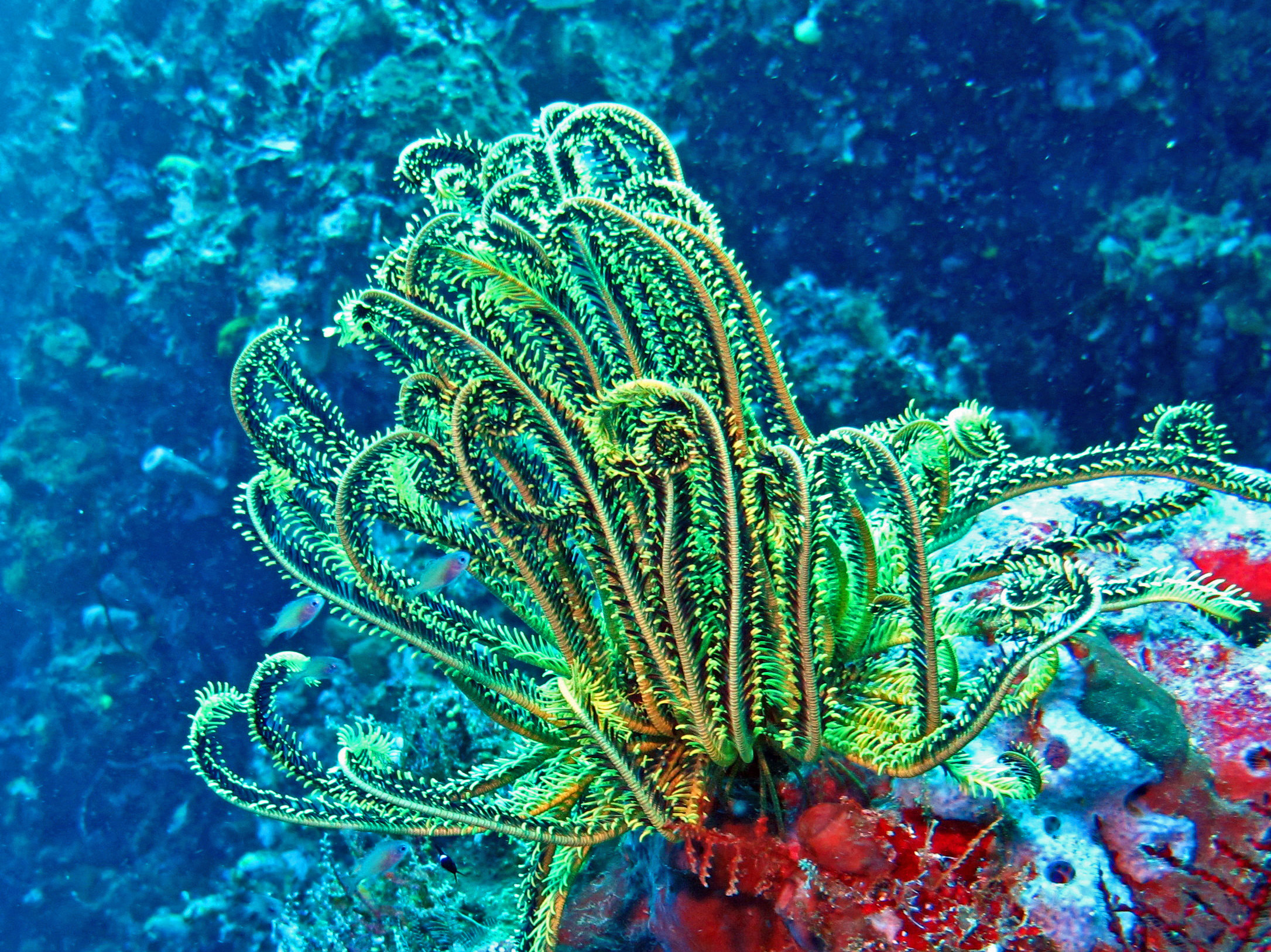
Anneissia bennetti in Philippines

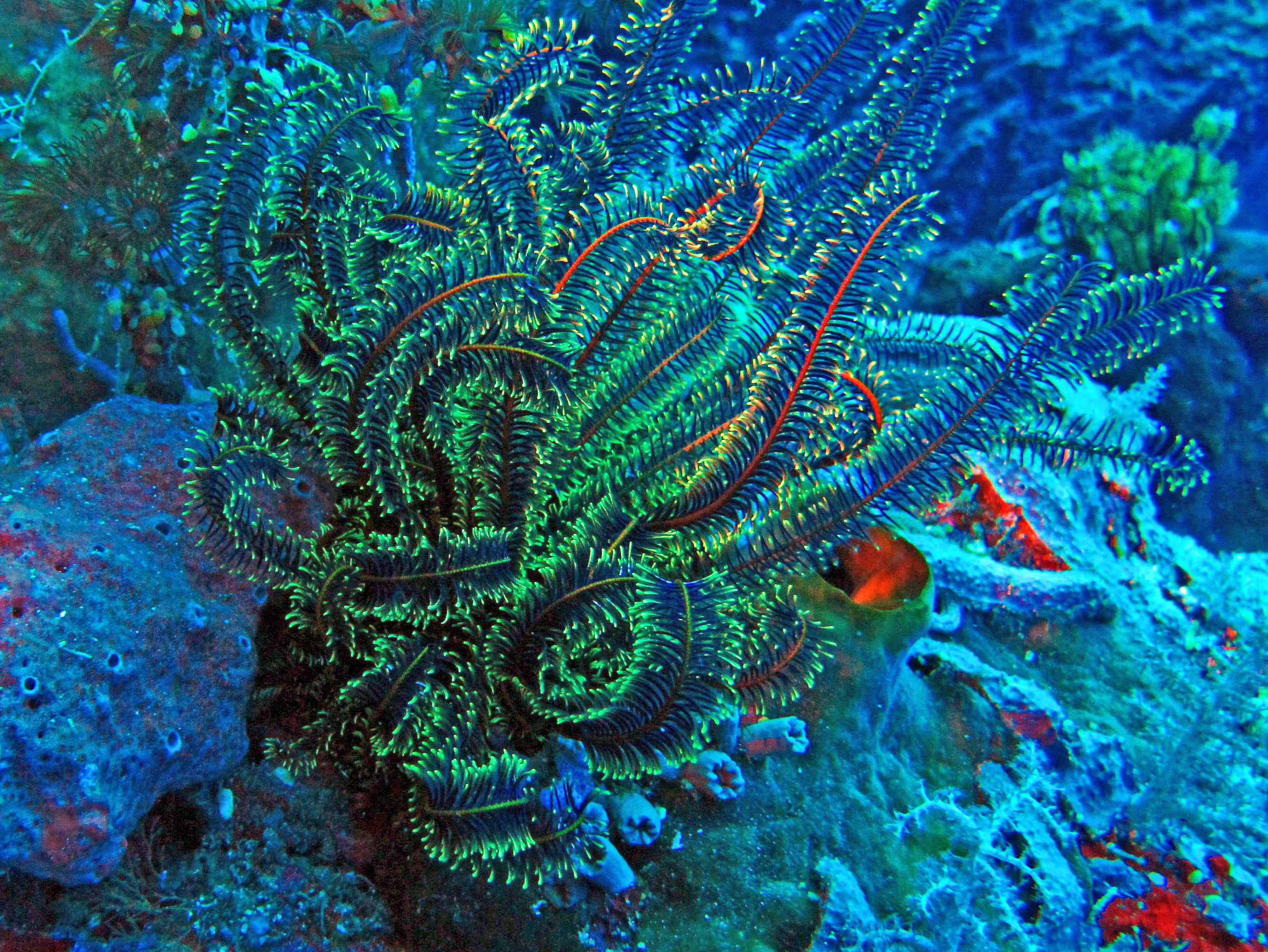
Anneissia bennetti in Philippines

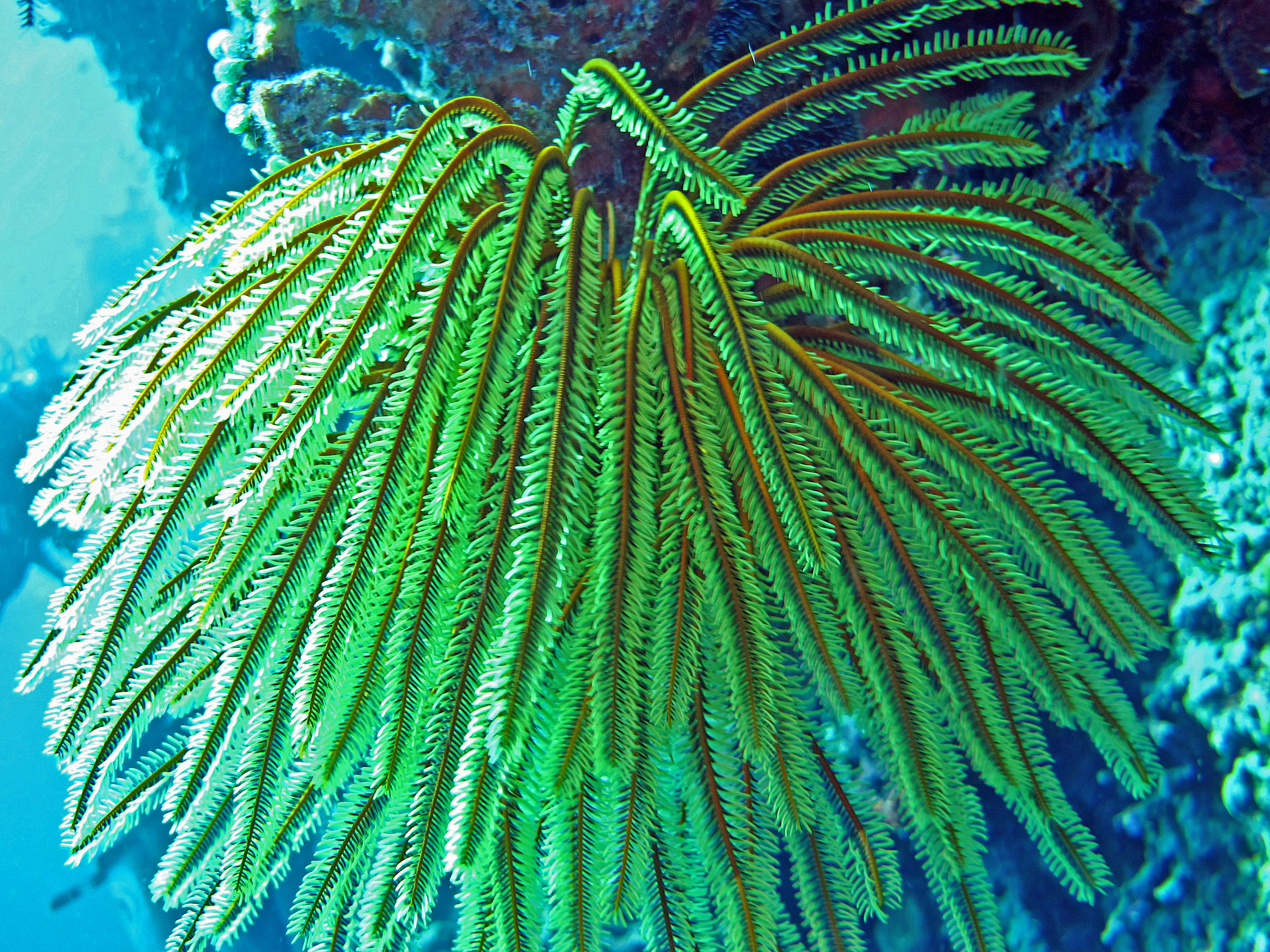
Anneissia bennetti in Philippines
