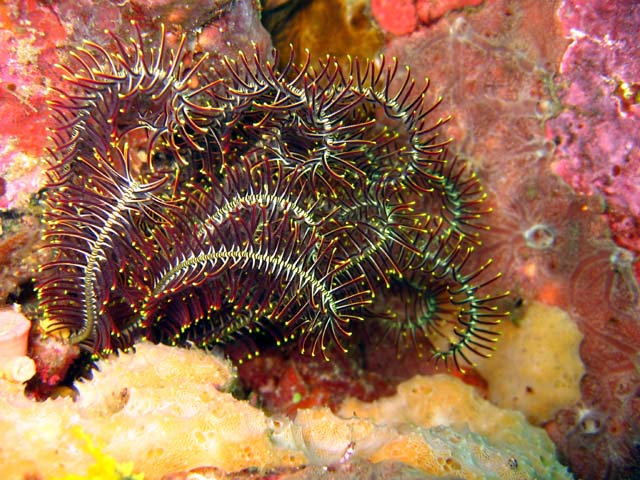
- Comanthus alternans

Scientific classification
- Domain: Eukaryota
- Kingdom: Animalia
- Phylum: Echinodermata
- Class: Crinoidea
- Order: Comatulida
- Family: Comatulidae
- Subfamily: Comatulinae
- Tribe: Comasterini
- Genus: Comanthus; Clark, 1908

= Comanthus =

Genus of crinoids

Comanthus is a genus of crinoid echinoderms (feather stars) belonging to the family Comatulidae.

The species of this genus are found in Indian and Pacific Ocean.

Species:

- Comanthus briareus (Bell, 1882)
- Comanthus delicata (AH Clark, 1909)
- Comanthus gisleni Rowe, Hoggett, Birtles & Vail, 1986
- Comanthus imbricatus (AH Clark, 1908)
- Comanthus kumi Fujita & Obuchi, 2012
- Comanthus novaezealandiae AH Clark, 1931
- Comanthus parvicirrus (Müller, 1841)
- Comanthus scintillus Obuchi & Fujita, 2017
- Comanthus suavia Rowe, Hoggett, Birtles & Vail, 1986
- Comanthus taviana (AH Clark, 1911)
- Comanthus wahlbergii (Müller, 1843) the "common feather star", known from False Bay to Mozambique, and Vema seamount in the South Atlantic, intertidal to 47m, usually 10 to 22 blunt tipped arms, variably coloured, sometimes variegated, mouth offset, anus central.
- Comanthus weberi (AH Clark, 1912)
