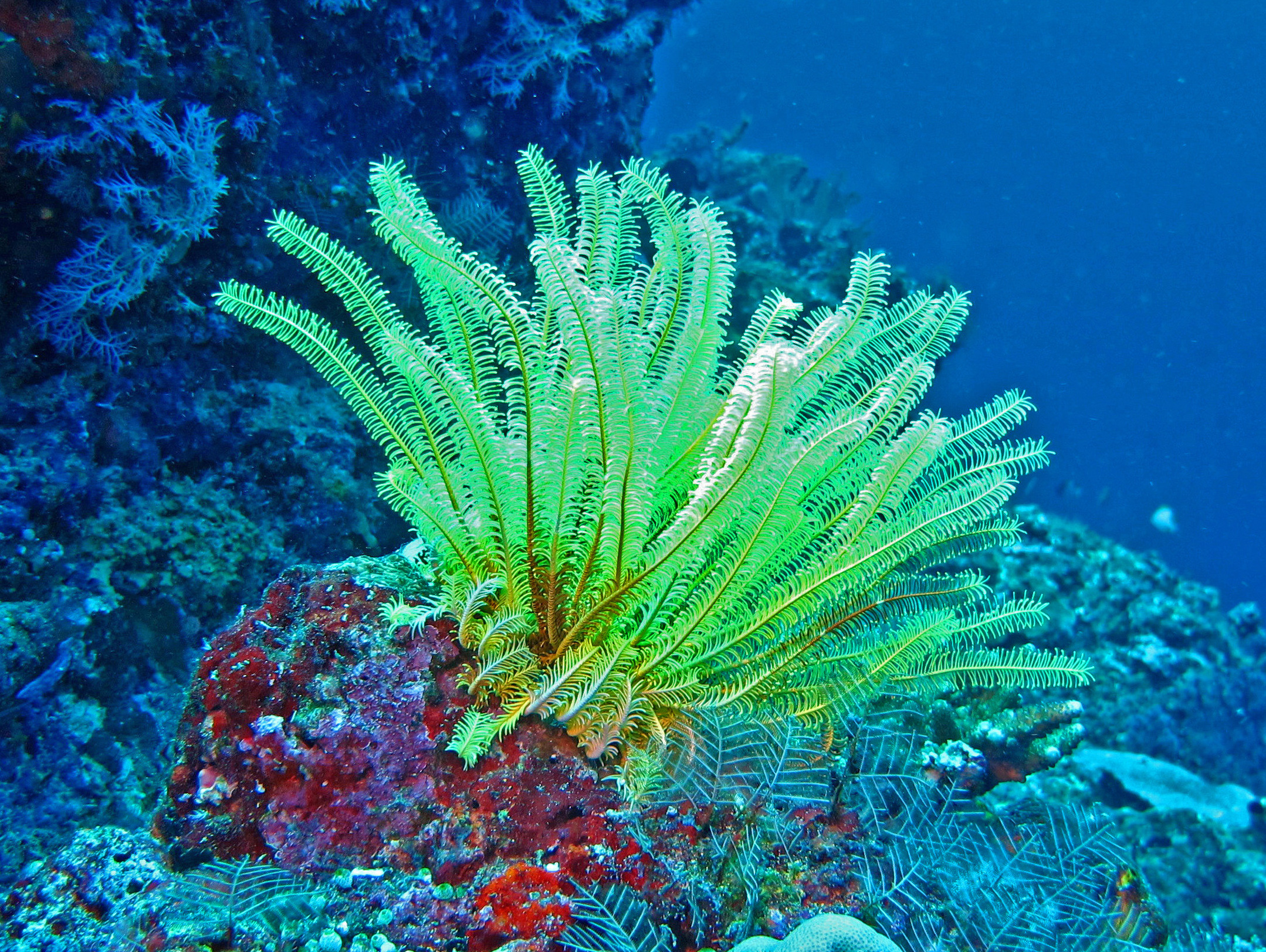
- Comaster nobilis

Scientific classification
- Kingdom: Animalia
- Phylum: Echinodermata
- Class: Crinoidea
- Superorder: Articulata
- Order: Comatulida
- Family: Comatulidae
- Subfamily: Comatulinae
- Tribe: Comasterini
- Genus: Comaster; L. Agassiz, 1836

Species
- See text

= Comaster =

Genus of crinoids

Comaster is a genus of crinoids.

== Species ==
The following species are included in the genus by the World Register of Marine Species:

- Comaster audax Rowe, Hoggett, Birtles & Vail, 1986
- Comaster meyerensis † Eagle, 2008
- Comaster multifidus (Müller, 1841)
- Comaster nobilis (Carpenter, 1884)
- Comaster schlegelii (Carpenter, 1881)

== Gallery ==
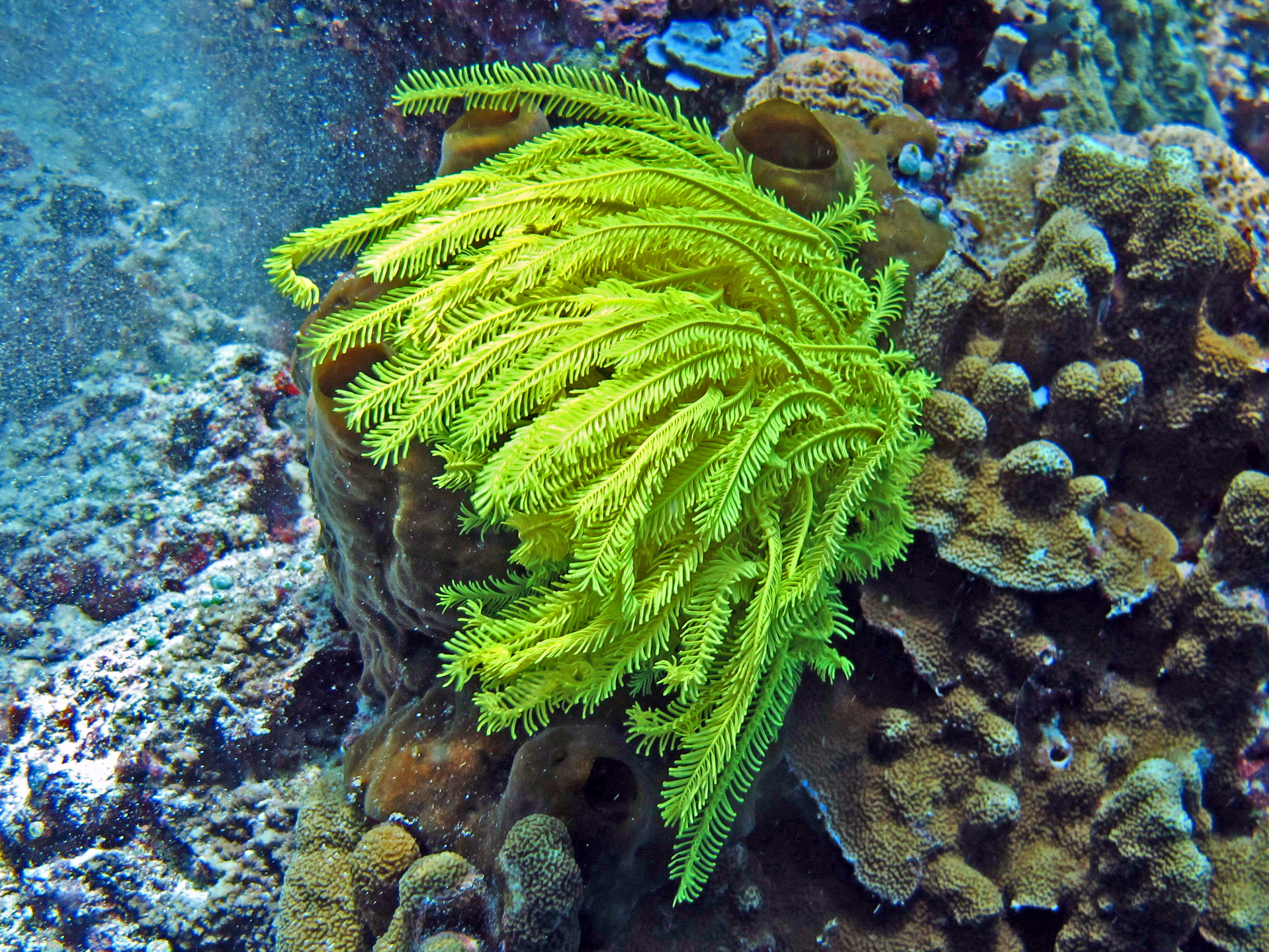
Comaster nobilis

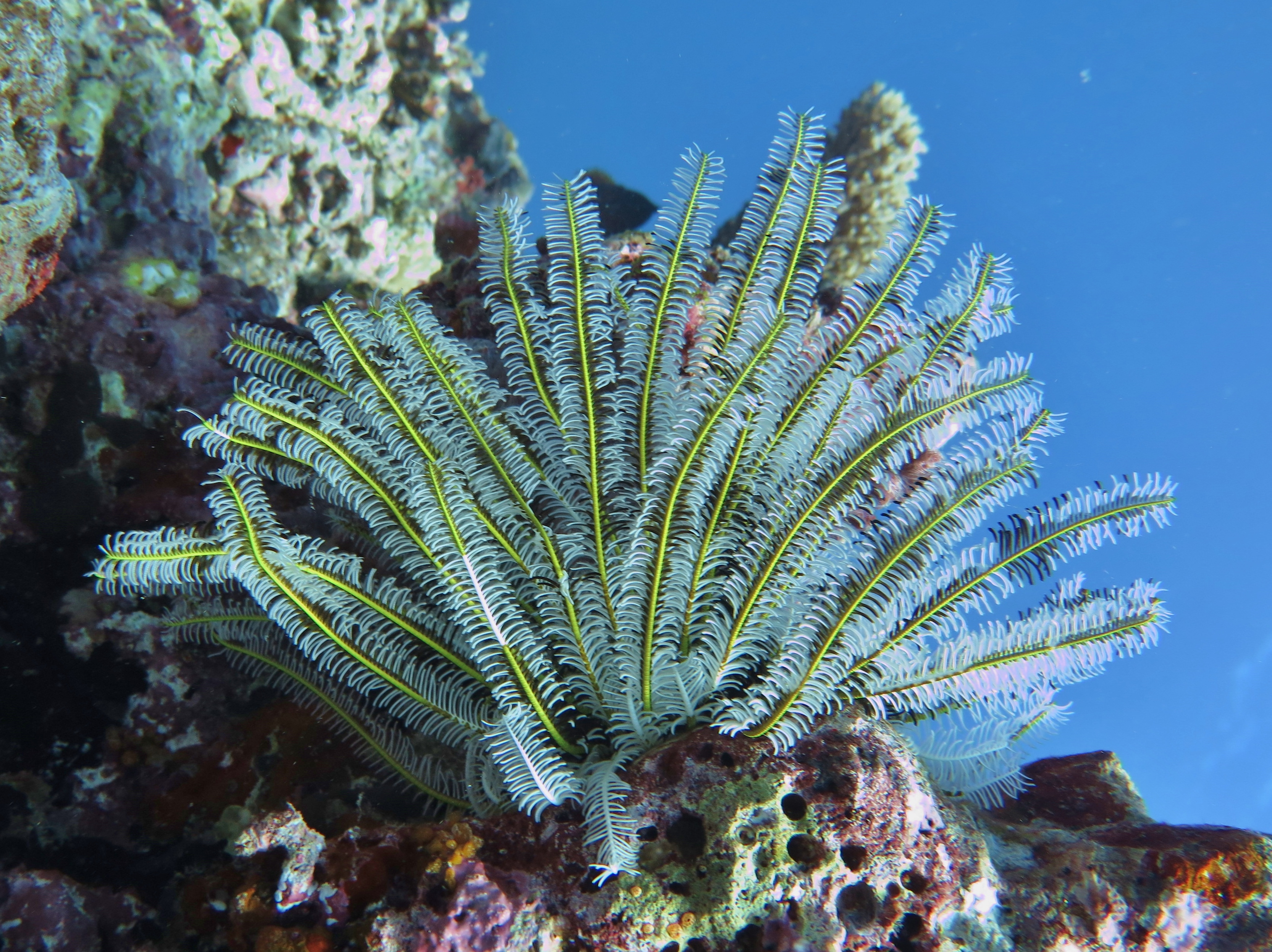
Comaster schlegelii
