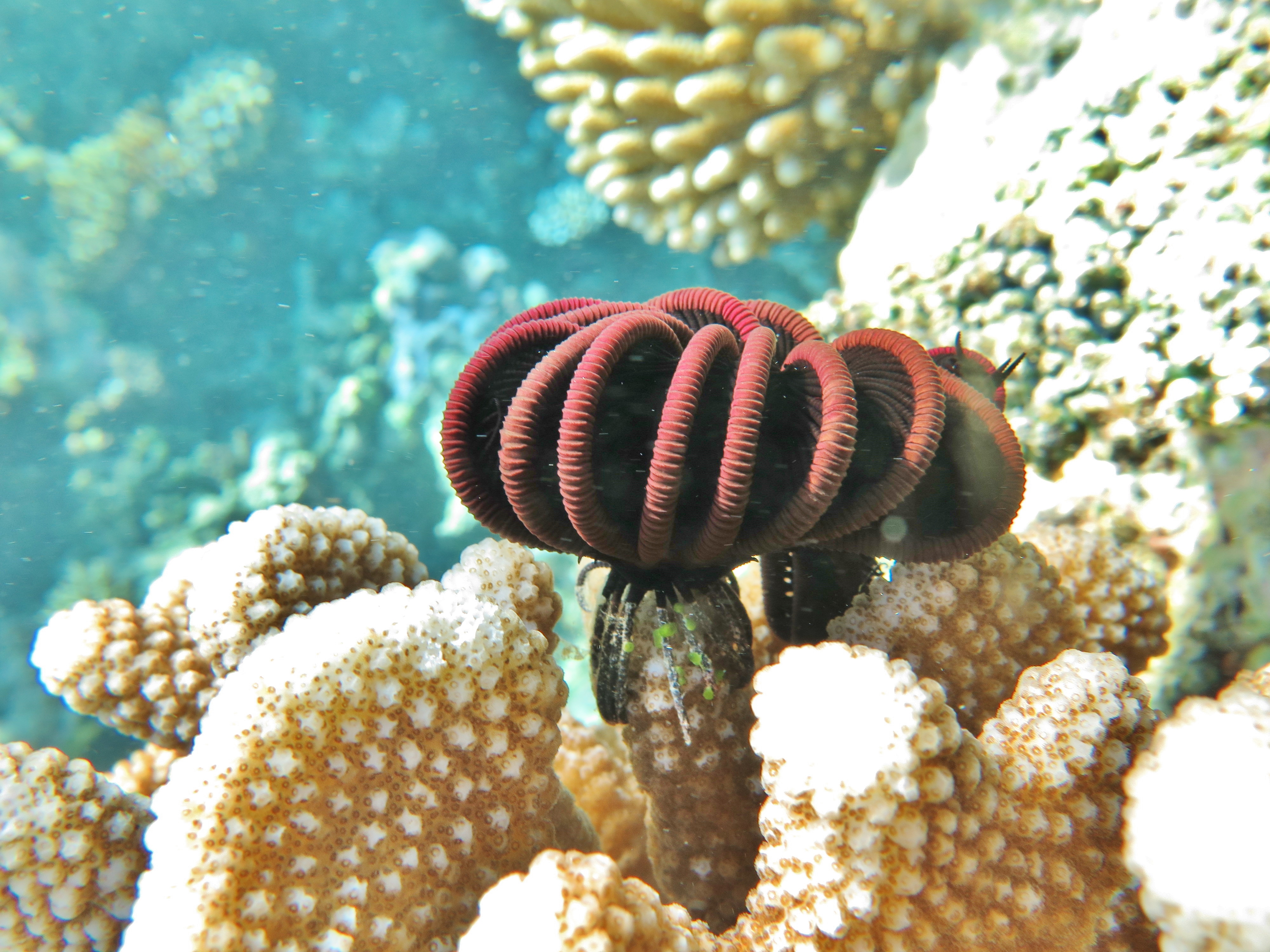
- Capillaster multiradiatus

Scientific classification
- Kingdom: Animalia
- Phylum: Echinodermata
- Class: Crinoidea
- Superorder: Articulata
- Order: Comatulida
- Family: Comatulidae
- Subfamily: Comatulinae
- Tribe: Capillasterini; A.H. Clark, 1909
- Genus: Capillaster; AH Clark, 1909

Species
- See text

= Capillaster =

Genus of crinoids

Capillaster is a genus of crinoids. It contains the following species:

- Capillaster asterias AH Clark, 1931
- Capillaster gracilicirra AH Clark, 1912
- Capillaster macrobrachius (Hartlaub, 1890)
- Capillaster mariae (AH Clark, 1907)
- Capillaster multiradiatus (Linnaeus, 1758)
- Capillaster sentosus (Carpenter, 1888)
- Capillaster squarrosus Messing, 2003
- Capillaster tenuicirrus AH Clark, 1912
