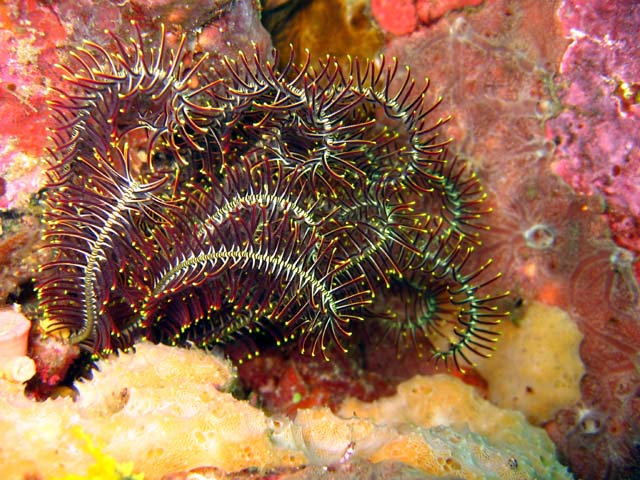
- Clarkcomanthus alternans

Scientific classification
- Kingdom: Animalia
- Phylum: Echinodermata
- Class: Crinoidea
- Superorder: Articulata
- Order: Comatulida
- Family: Comatulidae
- Subfamily: Comatulinae
- Tribe: Comasterini
- Genus: Clarkcomanthus; Rowe, Hoggett, Birtles & Vail, 1986

= Clarkcomanthus =

Genus of echinoderms

Clarkcomanthus is a genus of echinoderms belonging to the family Comatulidae.

The species of this genus are found in Malesia, Australia and East Africa.

Species:

- Clarkcomanthus albinotus Rowe, Hoggett, Birtles & Vail, 1986
- Clarkcomanthus alternans (Carpenter, 1881)
- Clarkcomanthus comanthipinna (Gislén, 1922)
- Clarkcomanthus littoralis (Carpenter, 1888)
- Clarkcomanthus luteofuscum (HL Clark, 1915)
- Clarkcomanthus mirabilis (Rowe, Hoggett, Birtles & Vail, 1986)
- Clarkcomanthus mirus (Rowe, Hoggett, Birtles & Vail, 1986)
- Clarkcomanthus perplexum (HL Clark, 1916)
