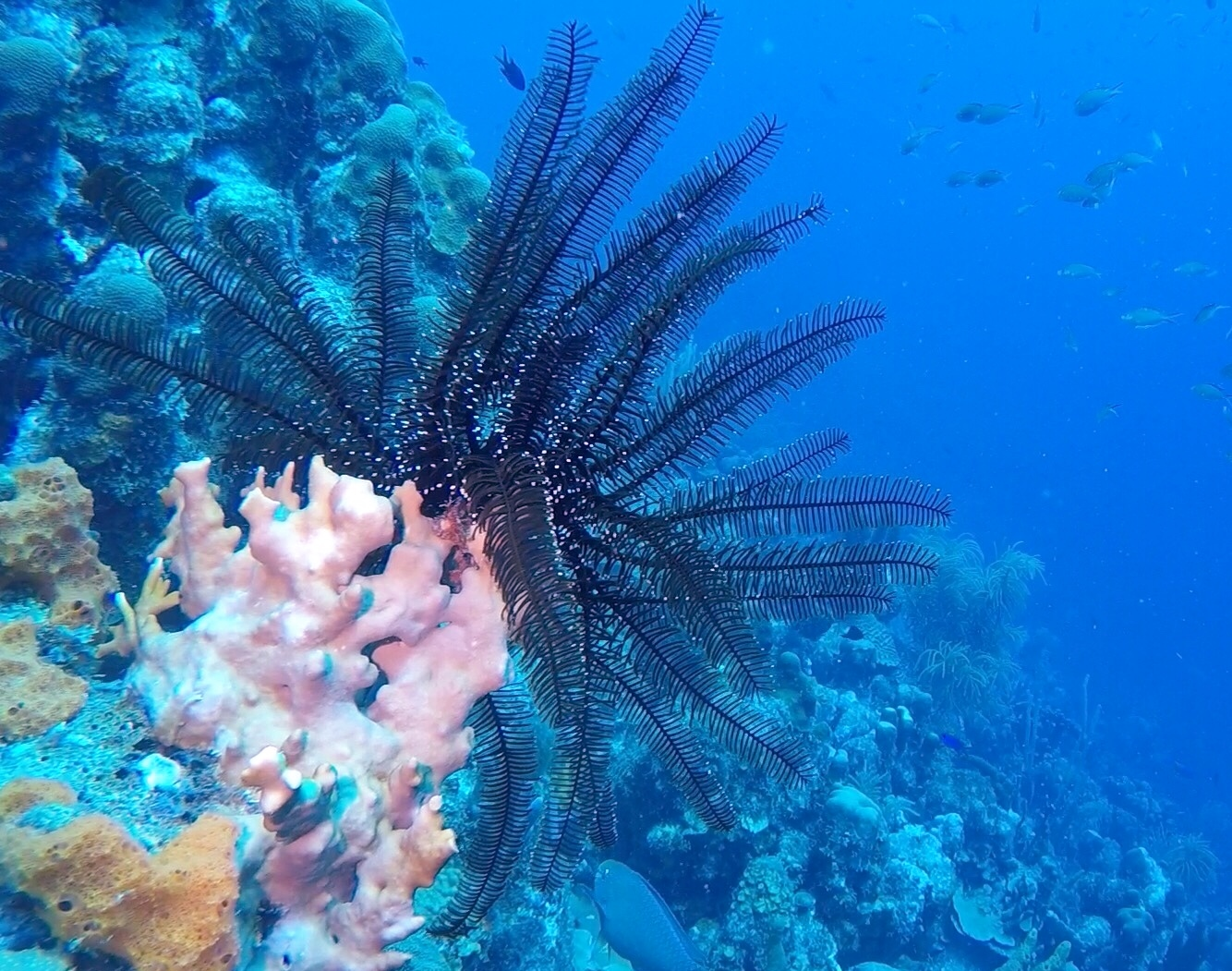
- Nemaster grandis

Scientific classification
- Domain: Eukaryota
- Kingdom: Animalia
- Phylum: Echinodermata
- Class: Crinoidea
- Order: Comatulida
- Family: Comatulidae
- Subfamily: Comatellinae
- Genus: Nemaster; Clark, 1909
- Species: N. grandis

Binomial name
- Nemaster grandis Clark, 1909

= Nemaster =

Genus of echinoderms

Nemaster is a monotypic genus of echinoderms belonging to the family Comatulida. The only species is Nemaster grandis.

The species is found in Central America and Australia.
