= Comatulidae =

Scientific classification
- Kingdom: Animalia
- Phylum: Echinodermata
- Class: Crinoidea
- Order: Comatulida
- Superfamily: Comatuloidea; Fleming, 1928
- Family: Comatulidae; Fleming, 1928

Genera
- See text

Family of crinoids

Comatulidae is a family of comatulid crinoids. Since 2015, it replaces the family Comasteridae.

== Description and characteristics ==
This family is of recent restoration, and still has no consensual description. However the description of the family Comasteridae remains partially valid.

This family counts between 93 and 95 species, distributed in 21 genera, which makes it the second most diversified family of crinoids the behind Antedonidae, representing approximately 1/6th of known crinoid species. It contains most of the big species of shallow tropical feather stars, in particular in the Indo-Pacific.

== List of genera ==
This family has been recently restored following genetic works from Charles Messing's team.

It contains the following genera:

- subfamily Comatellinae Summers, Messing, Rouse, 2014
  - genus Alloeocomatella Messing, 1995 -- 2 species
  - genus Comatella AH Clark, 1908 -- 2 species
  - genus Davidaster Hoggett & Rowe, 1986 -- 2 species
  - genus Nemaster AH Clark, 1909 -- 1 species
- genus Comatilia AH Clark, 1909 -- 1 species
- genus Comatulides AH Clark, 1918 -- 1 species
- subfamily Comatulinae Fleming, 1828
  - tribe Capillasterini AH Clark, 1909
    - genus Capillaster AH Clark, 1909 -- 8 species
  - tribe Comasterini AH Clark, 1908
    - genus Anneissia Summers, Messing, Rouse, 2014 -- 8 species
    - genus Cenolia AH Clark, 1916 -- 6 species
    - genus Clarkcomanthus Rowe, Hoggett, Birtles & Vail, 1986 -- 9 species
    - genus Comanthus AH Clark, 1908 -- 11 species
    - genus Comaster L. Agassiz, 1836 -- 4 species
  - tribe Comatulini Fleming, 1828
    - genus Comactinia AH Clark, 1909 -- 3 species
    - genus Comatula Lamarck, 1816 -- 7 species
  - tribe Neocomatellini Summers, Messing, Rouse, 2014
    - genus Comatulella AH Clark, 1911 -- 1 species
    - genus Neocomatella AH Clark, 1909 -- 3 species
  - tribe Phanogeniini White & Messing, 2001 (in White & al., 2001)
    - genus Aphanocomaster Messing, 1995 -- 1 species
    - genus Comissia Clark, 1909 -- 14 species
    - genus Phanogenia Lovén, 1866 -- 9 species
- genus Palaeocomatella AH Clark, 1912 -- 3 species
- genus Rowemissia Messing, 2001 -- 1 species
- Comatulidae incertae sedis—6 species
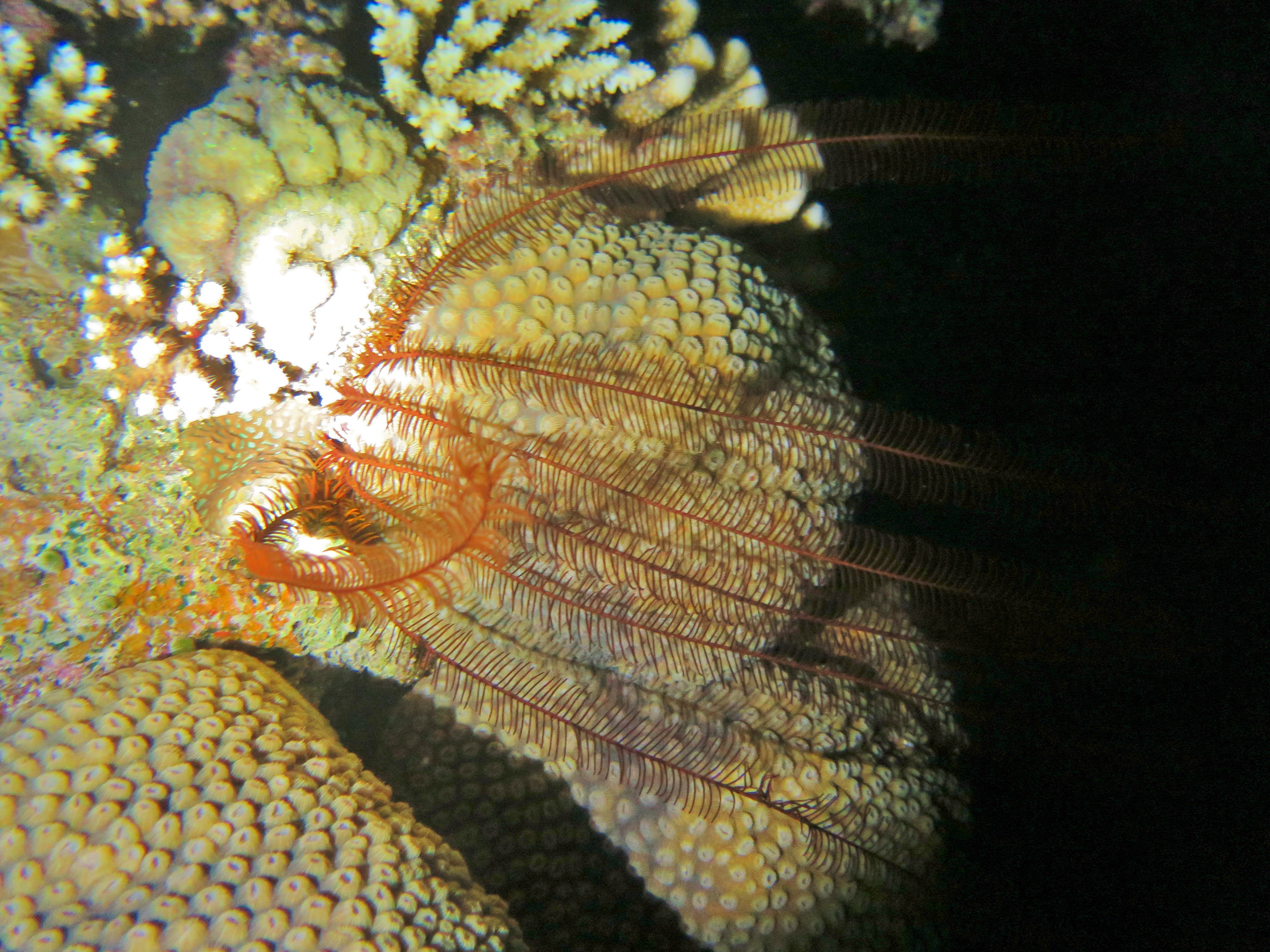
Alloeocomatella pectinifera

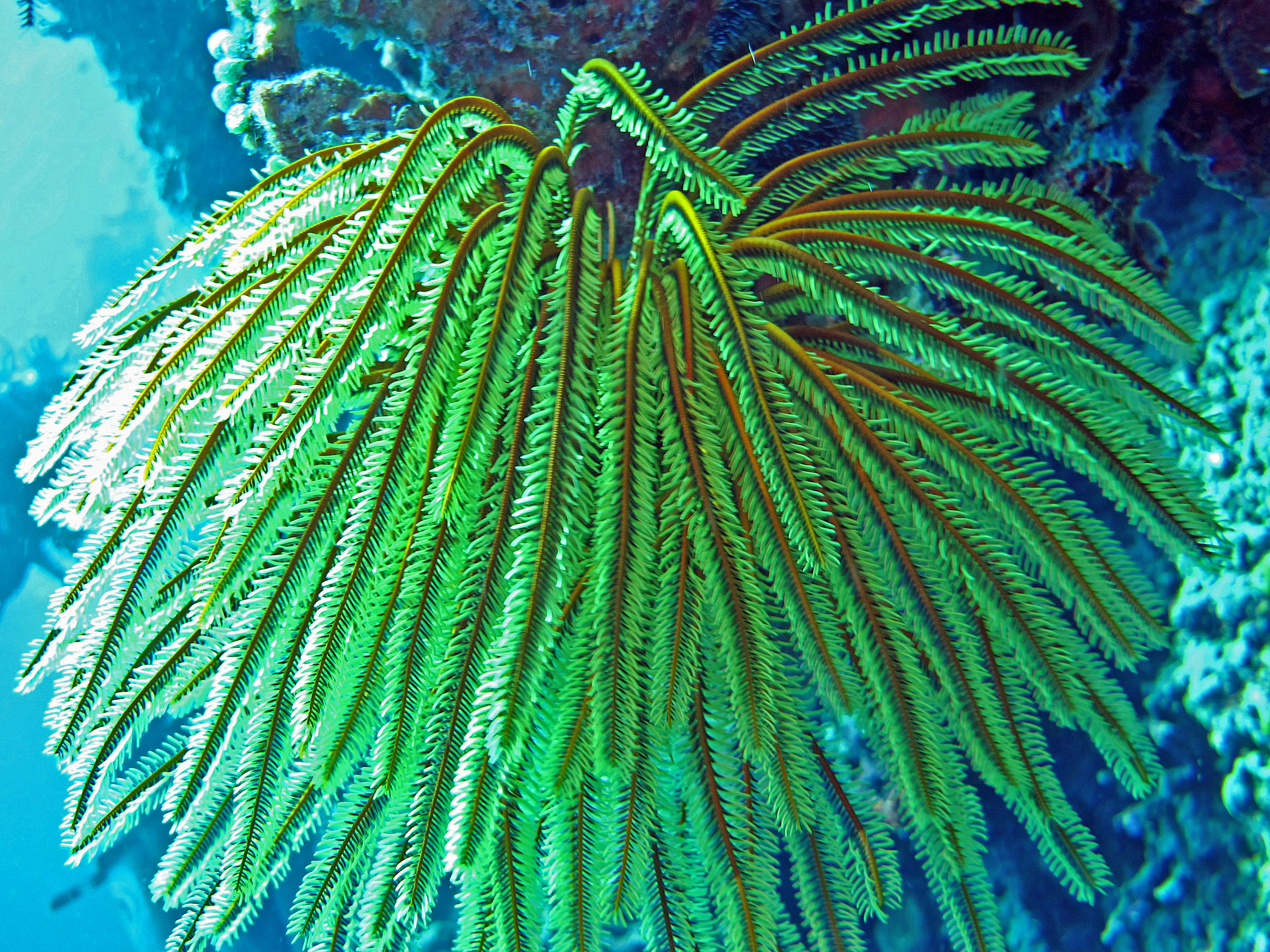
Anneissia bennetti

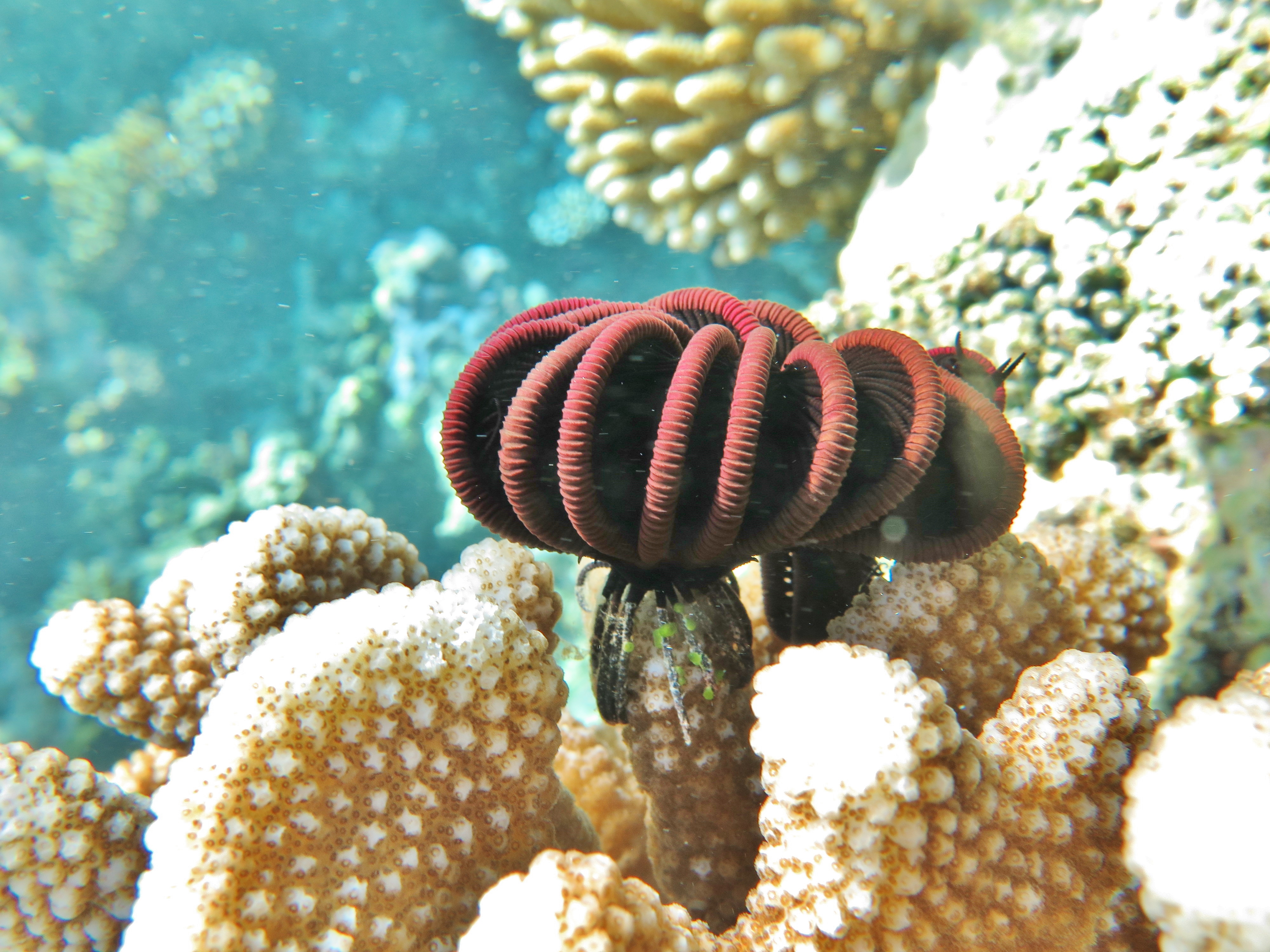
Capillaster multiradiatus

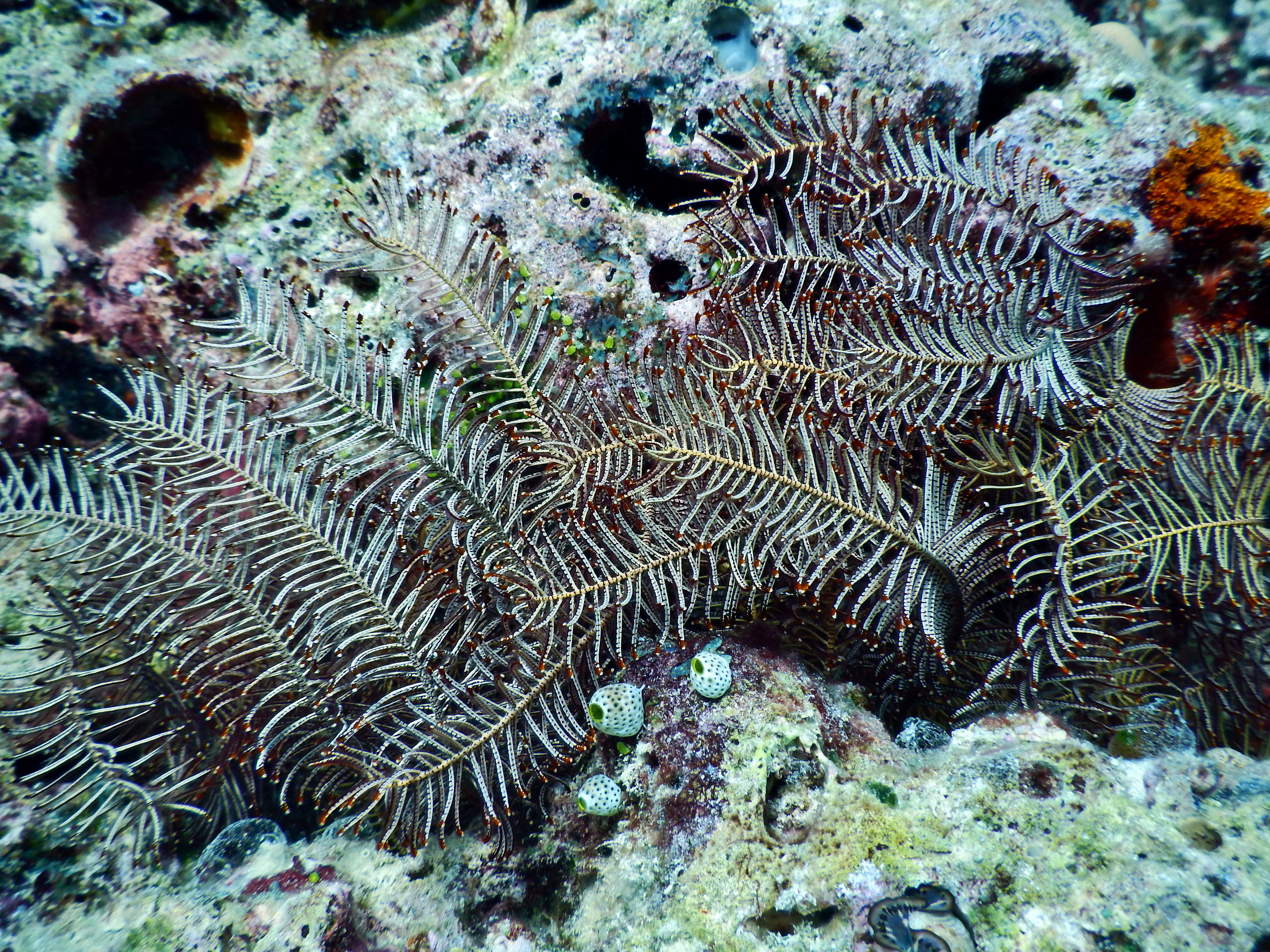
Clarkcomanthus mirabilis

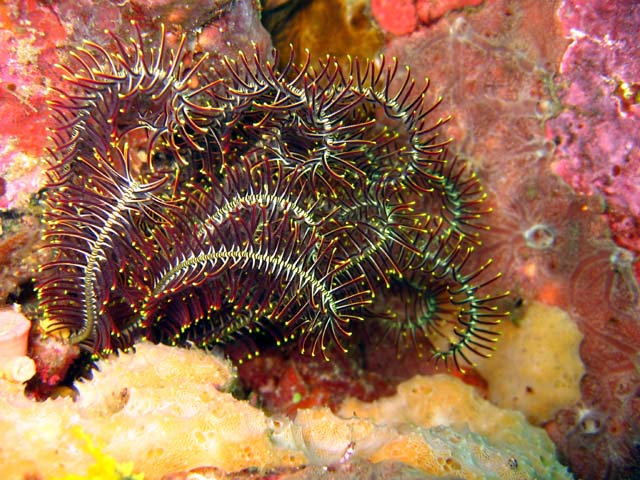
Comanthus alternans

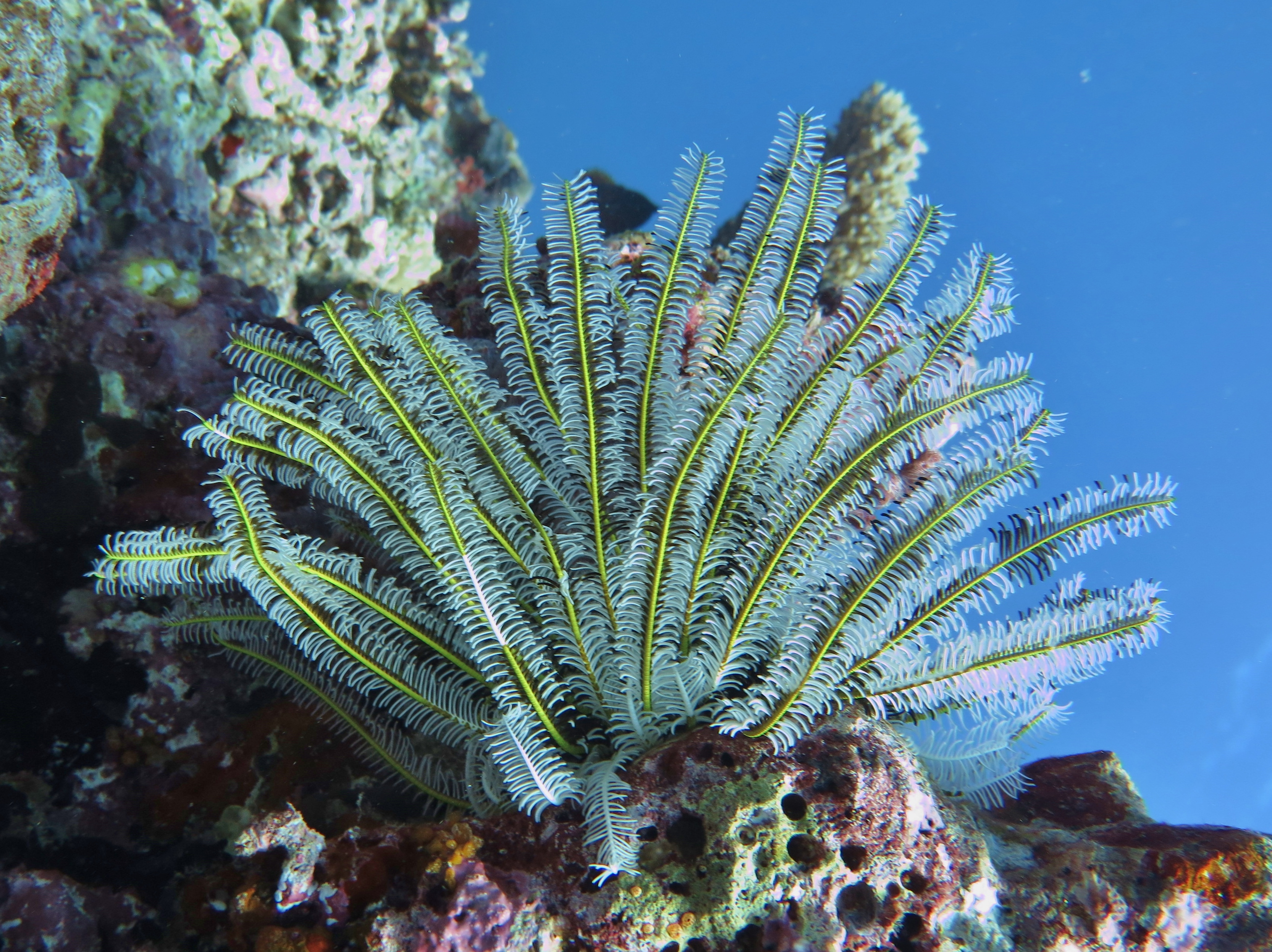
Comaster schlegelii

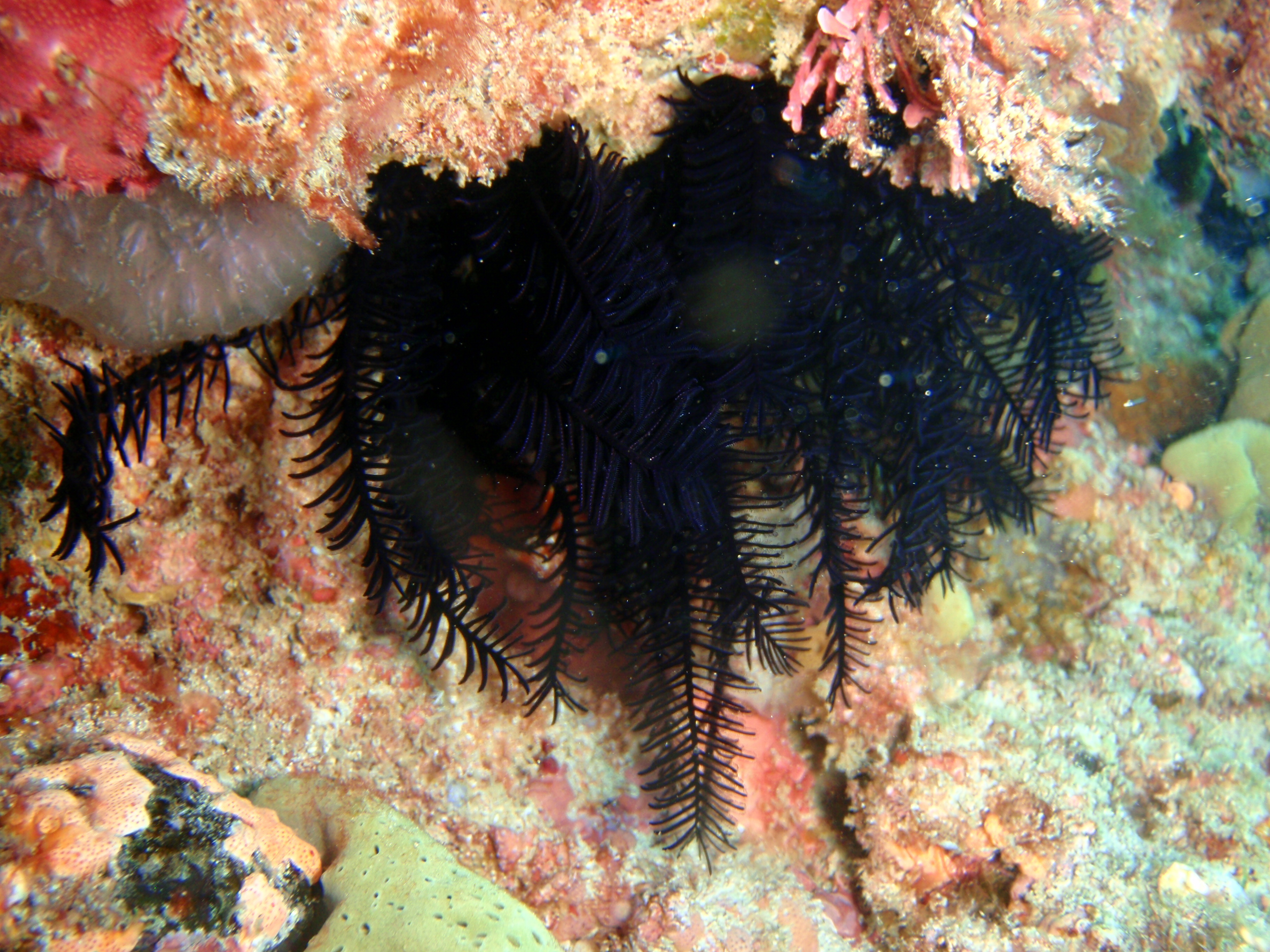
Comatula purpurea

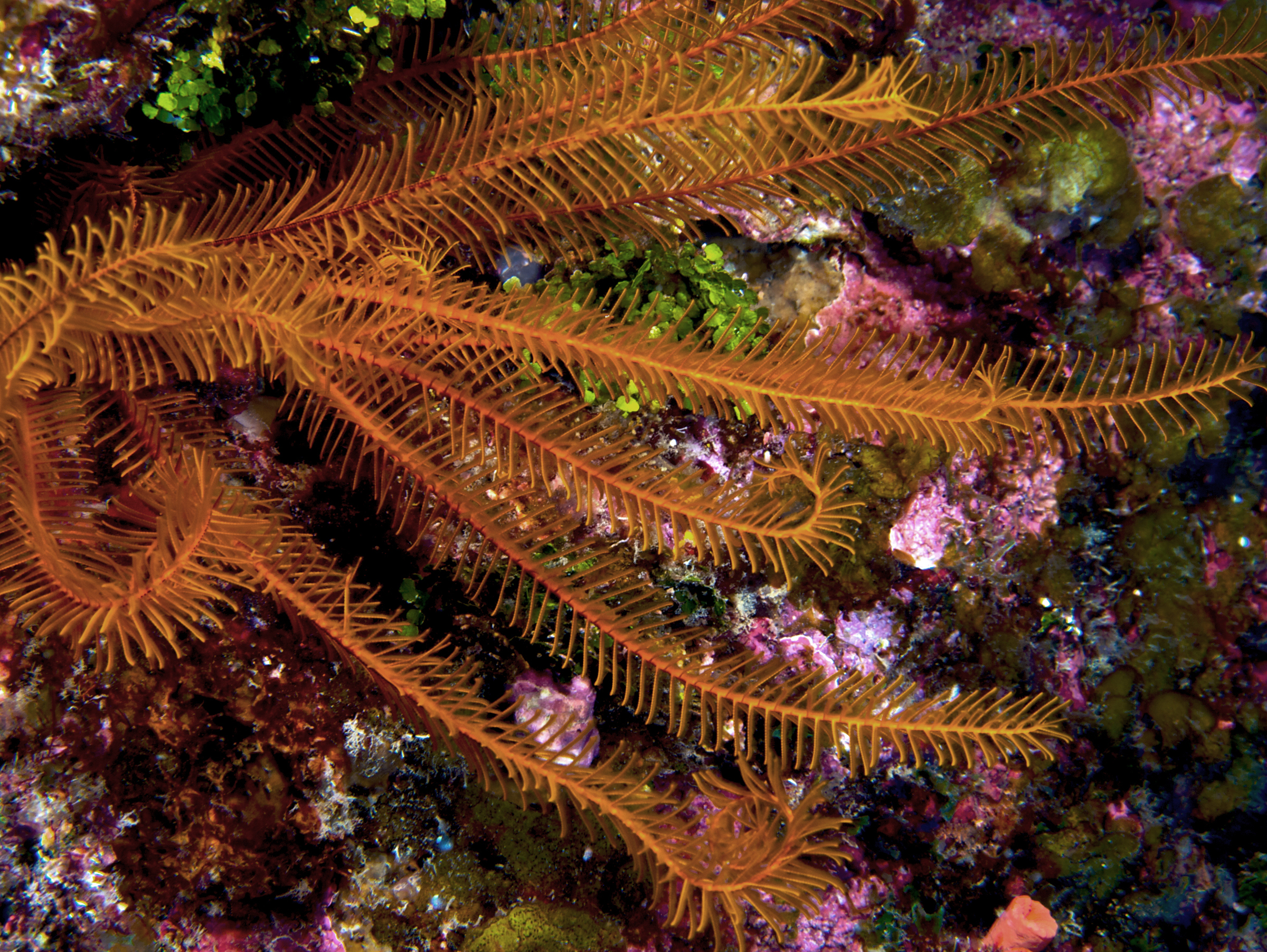
Davidaster rubiginosus
