= List of echinoderm orders =

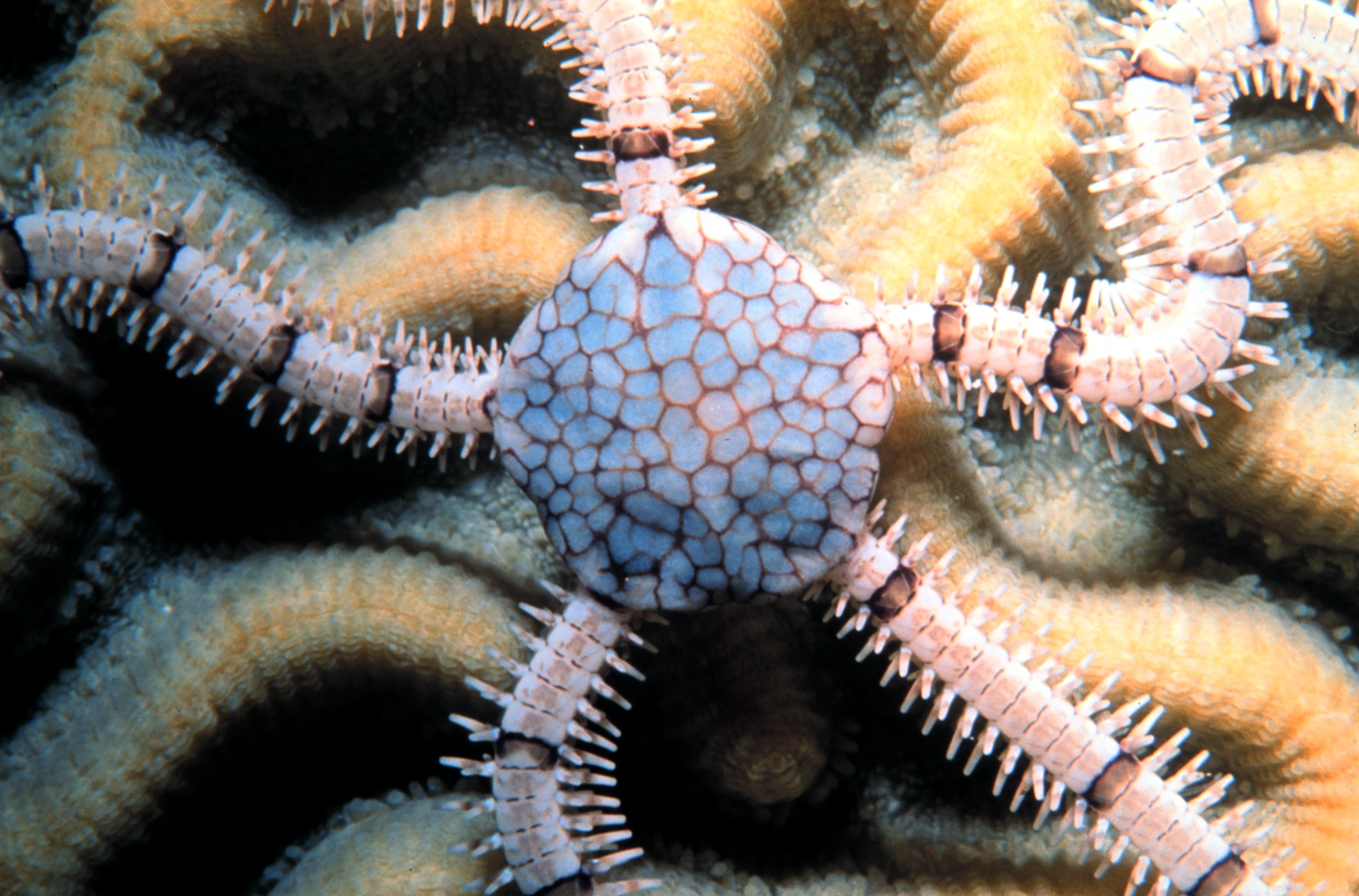
A brittle star, Ophionereis reticulata

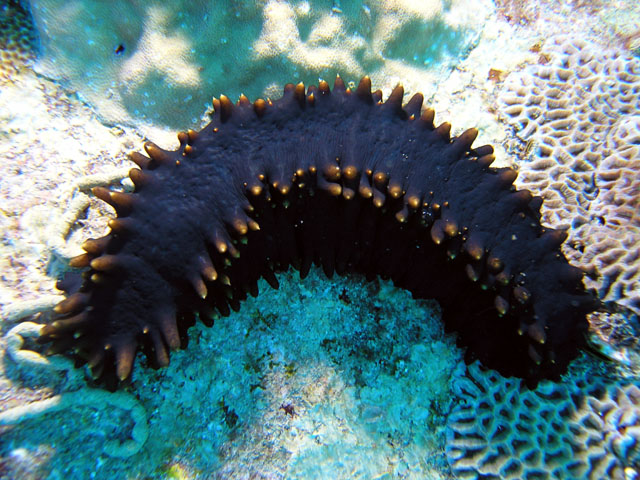
A sea cucumber from Malaysia

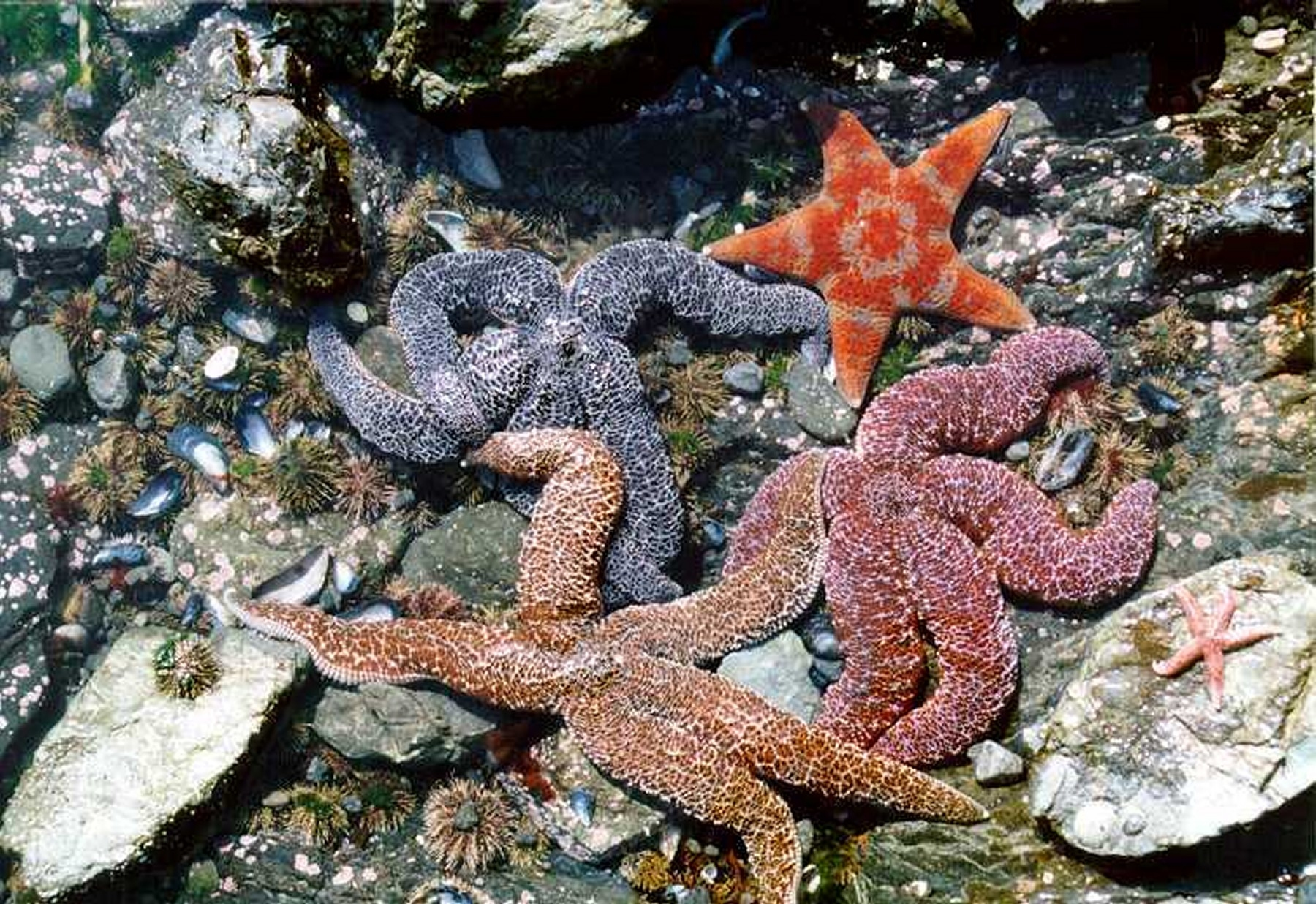
Starfish exhibit a wide range of colours.

This List of echinoderm orders concerns the various classes and orders into which taxonomists categorize the roughly 7000 extant species as well as the extinct species of the exclusively marine phylum Echinodermata.

== Subphylum Crinozoa ==
=== Class Crinoidea ===
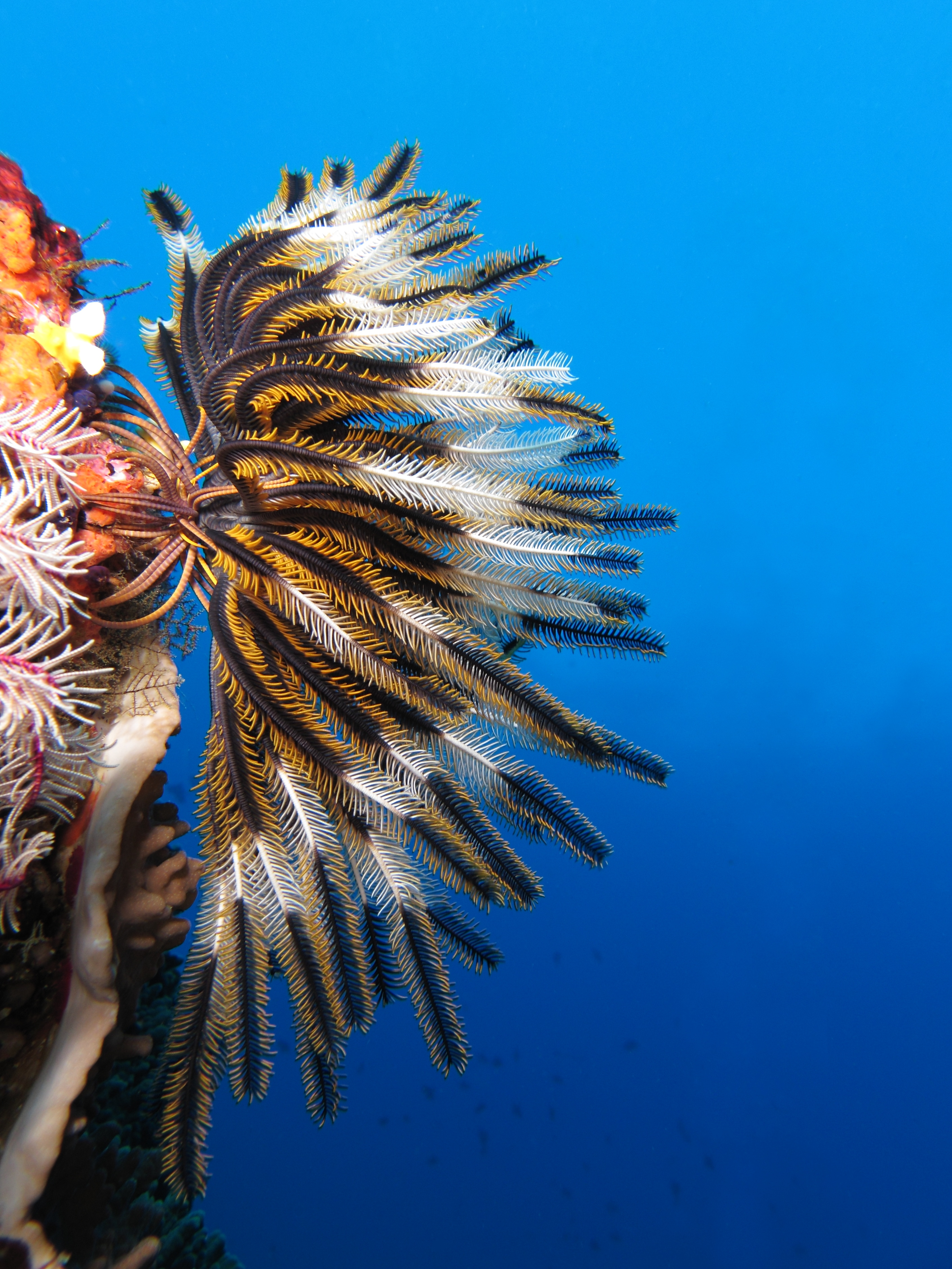
Crinoid

- Subclass Articulata (540 species)
  - Order Bourgueticrinida
  - Order Comatulida
  - Order Cyrtocrinida
  - Order Hyocrinida
  - Order Isocrinida
  - Order Millericrinida
- Subclass †Flexibilia
- Subclass †Camerata
- Subclass †Disparida
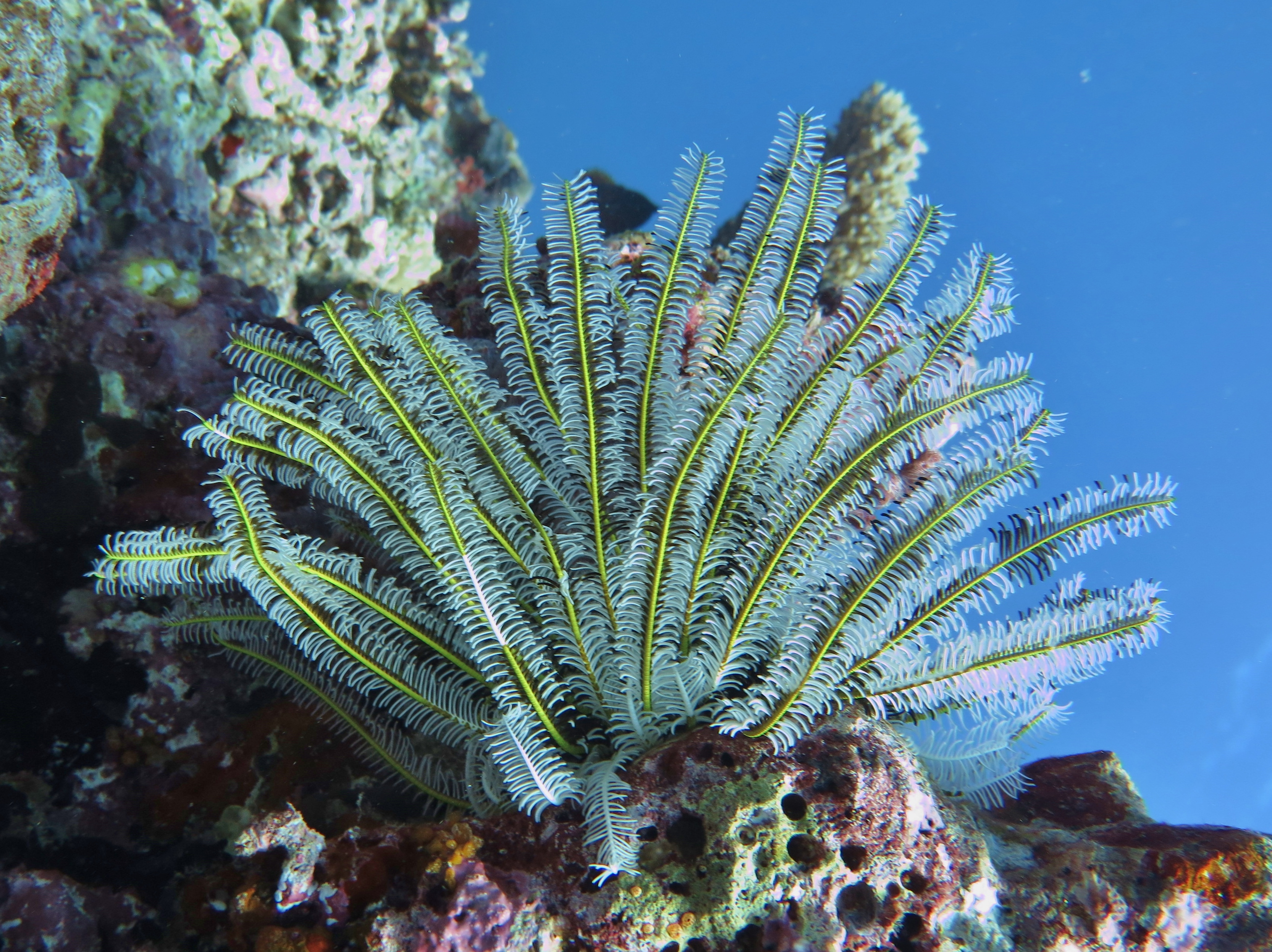
Comaster schlegelii (Comatulida)

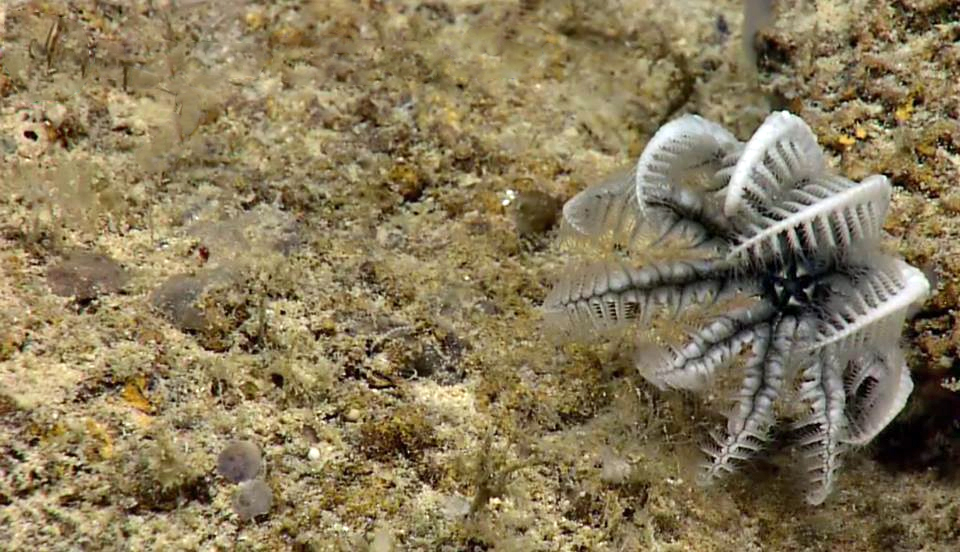
Holopus sp. (Cyrtocrinida)

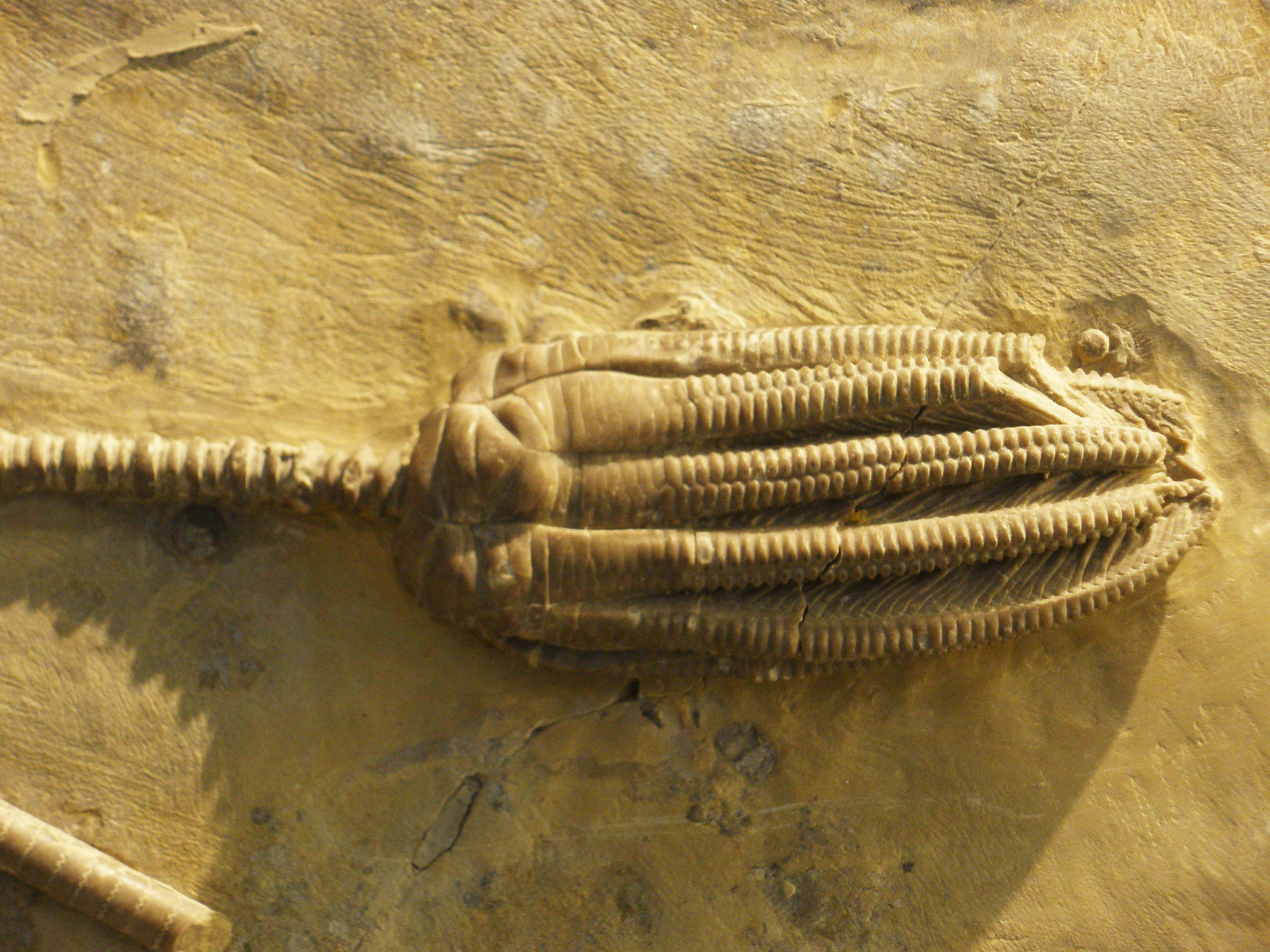
Encrinus liliiformis (Encrinida)

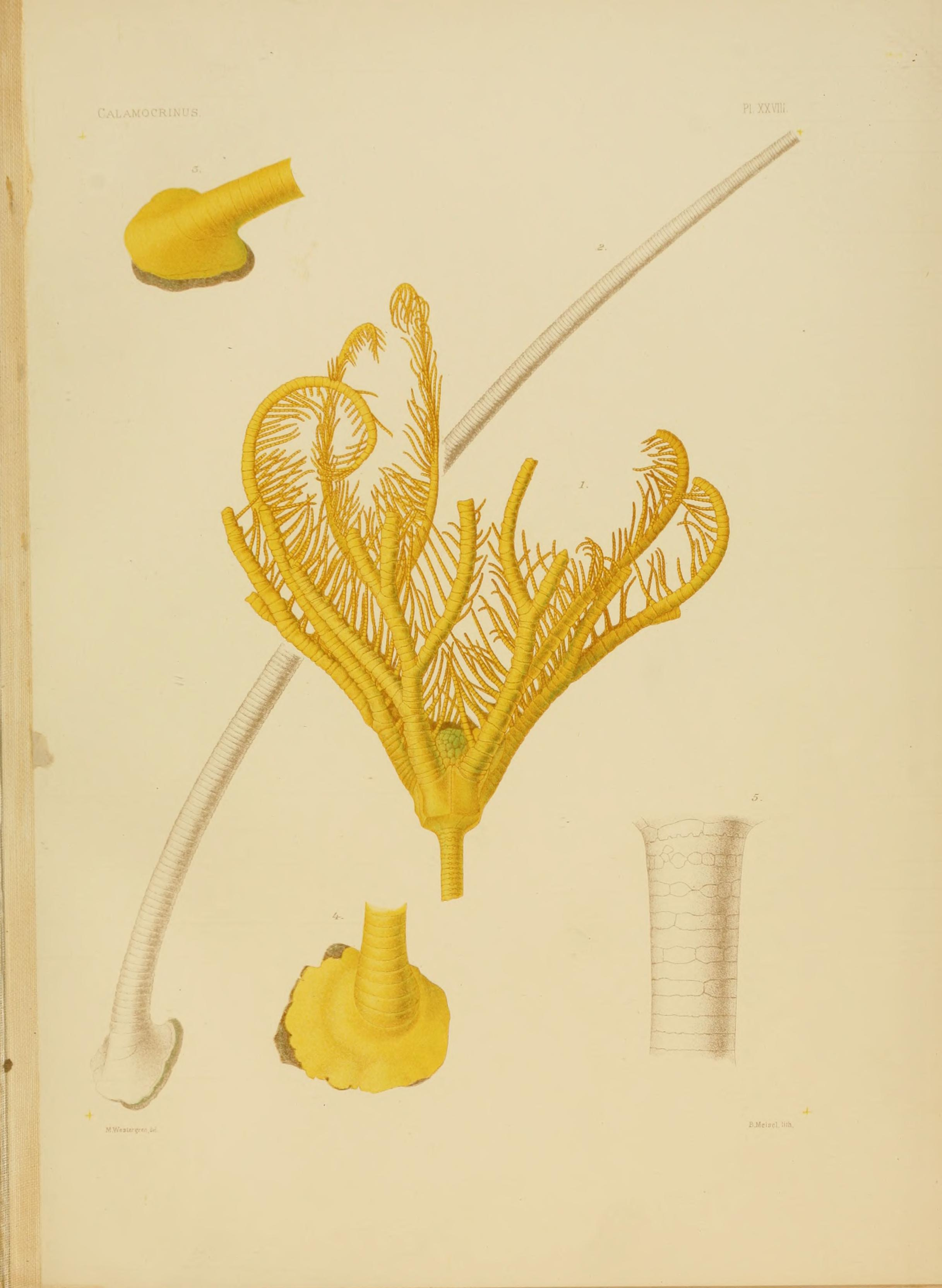
Calamocrinus diomedae (Hyocrinida)

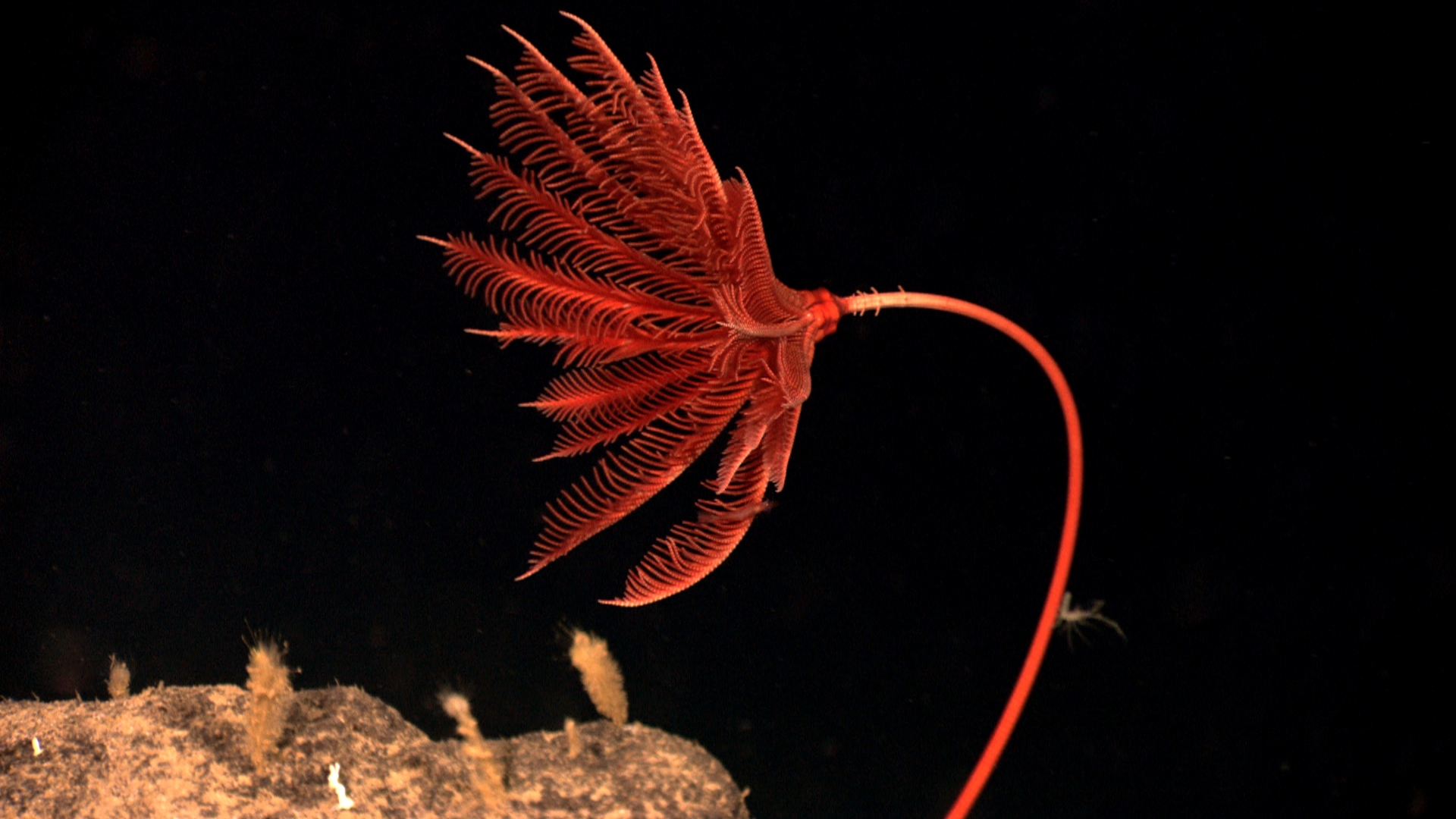
Proisocrinus ruberrimus (Isocrinida)

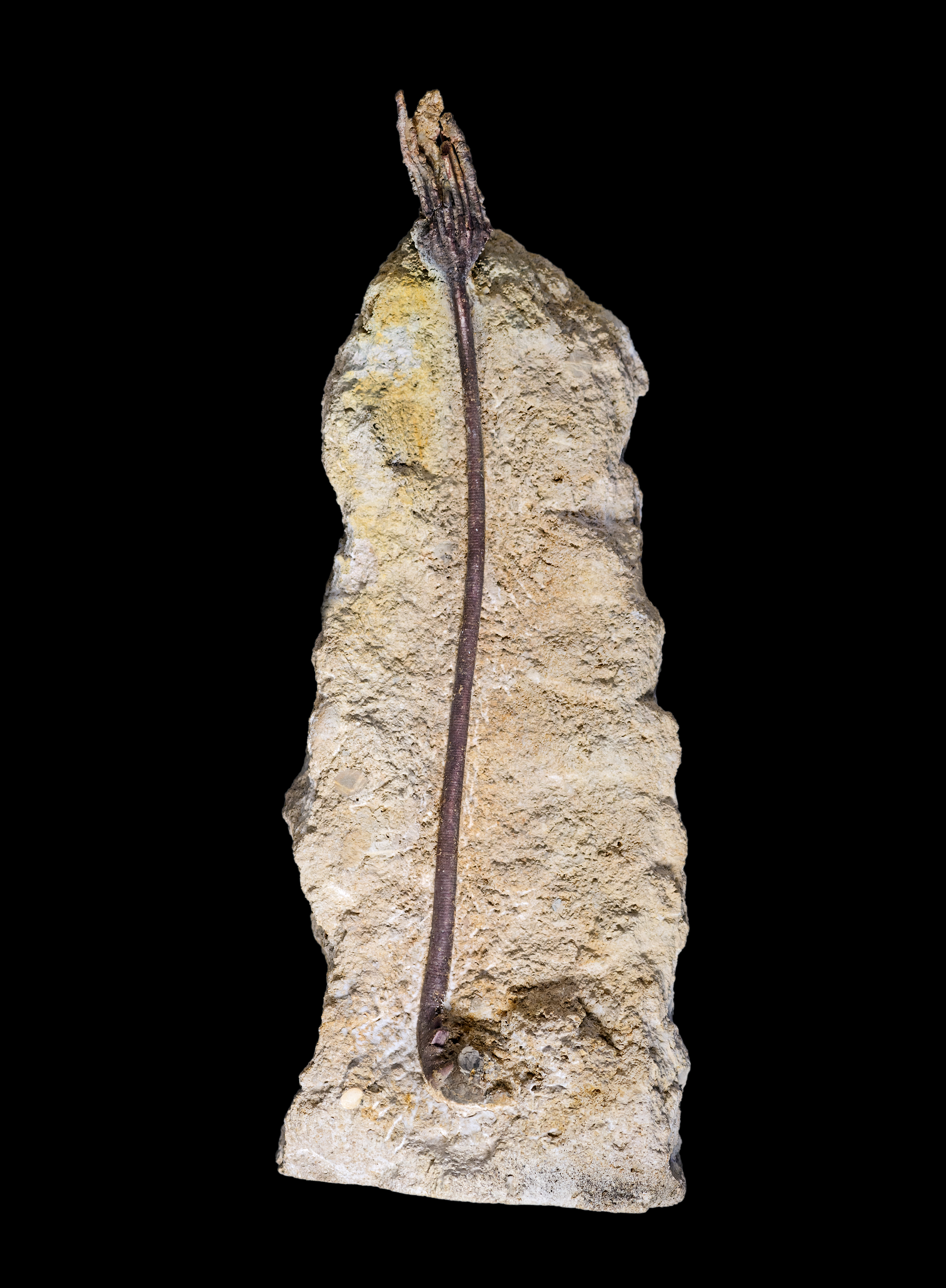
Liliocrinus polydactylus (Millericrinida)

=== ? Class Camptostromatoidea † ===
Recent research has found weak support for the recovery of Camptostroma as the sister group of the crinoids. However, other phylogenies are ambiguous regarding whether it is closer to the crinoids, eocrinoids, or eleutherozoans.

== Subphylum Asterozoa ==
=== Class Ophiuroidea (Brittle stars) ===
- order Euryalida
- order Ophiurida
- order Amphilepidida
- order Ophiacanthida
- order Ophioleucida
- order Ophioscolecida
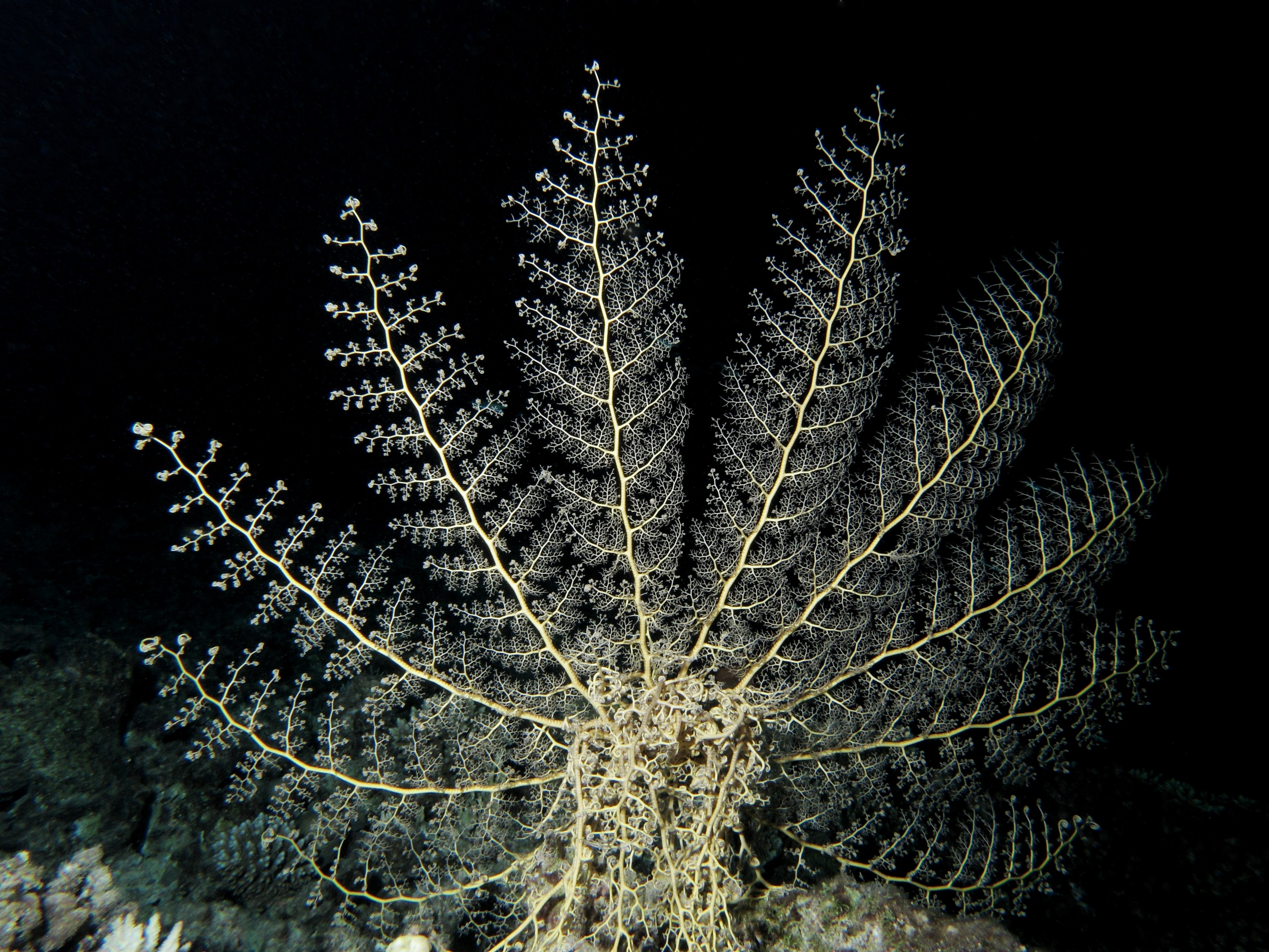
Astroboa nuda (Euryalida)

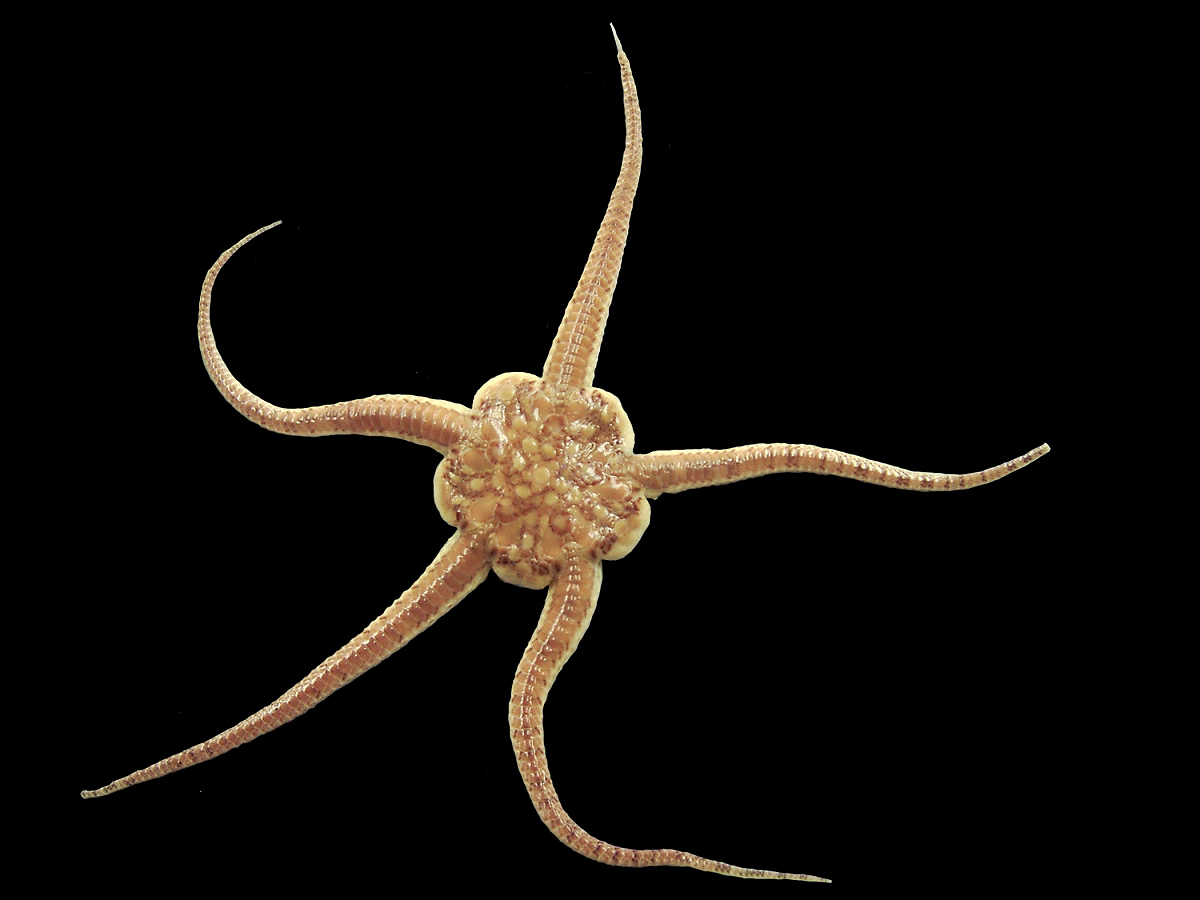
Ophiura ophiura (Ophiurida)

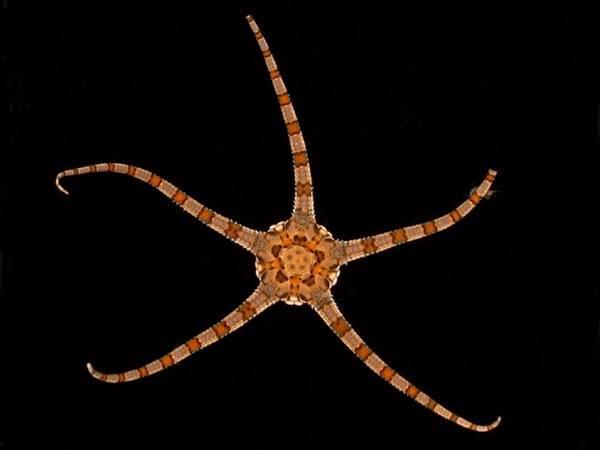
Ophiolepis elegans (Amphilepidida)

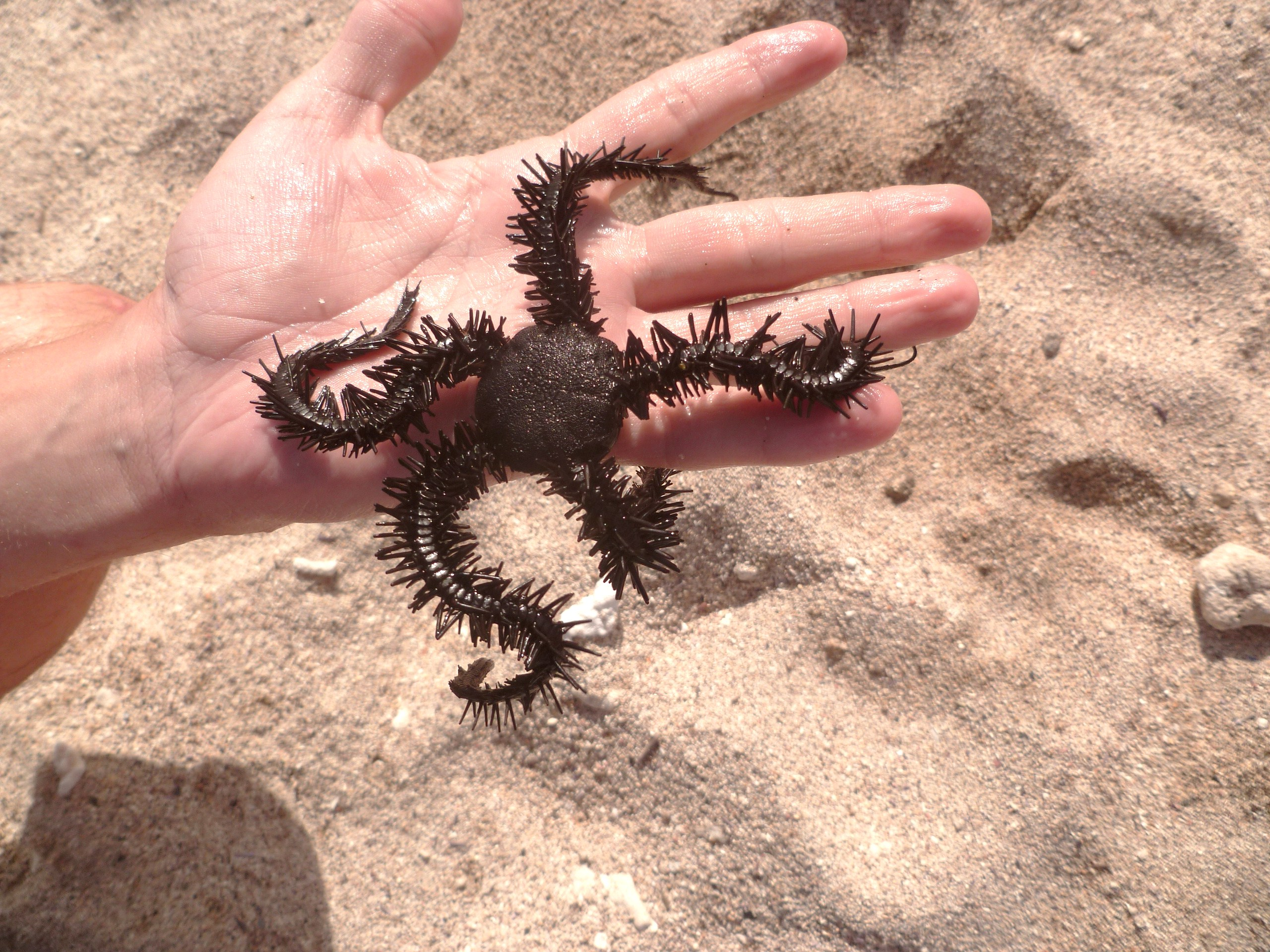
Ophiocoma erinaceus (Ophiacanthida)

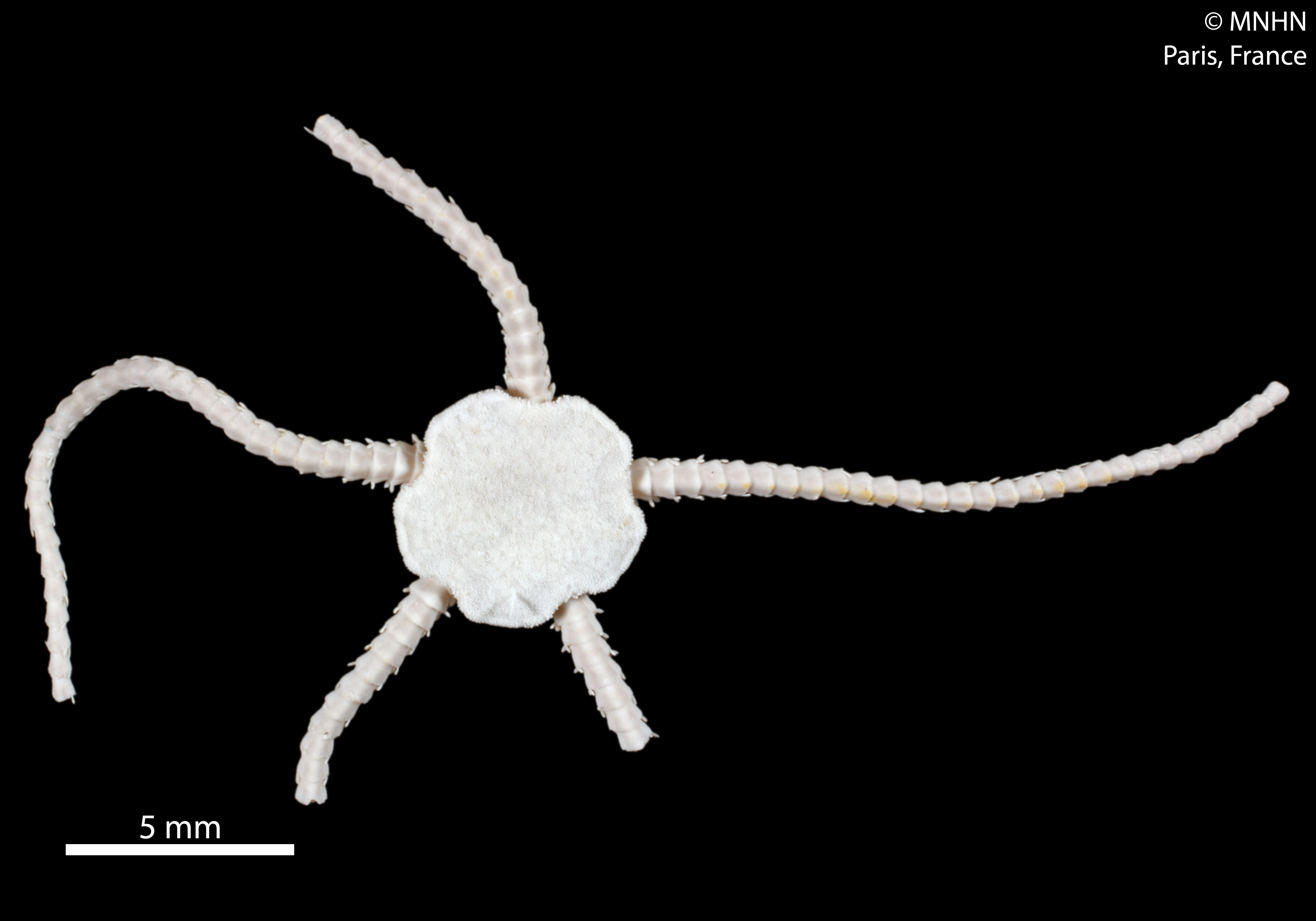
Ophioleuce seminudum (Ophioleucida)

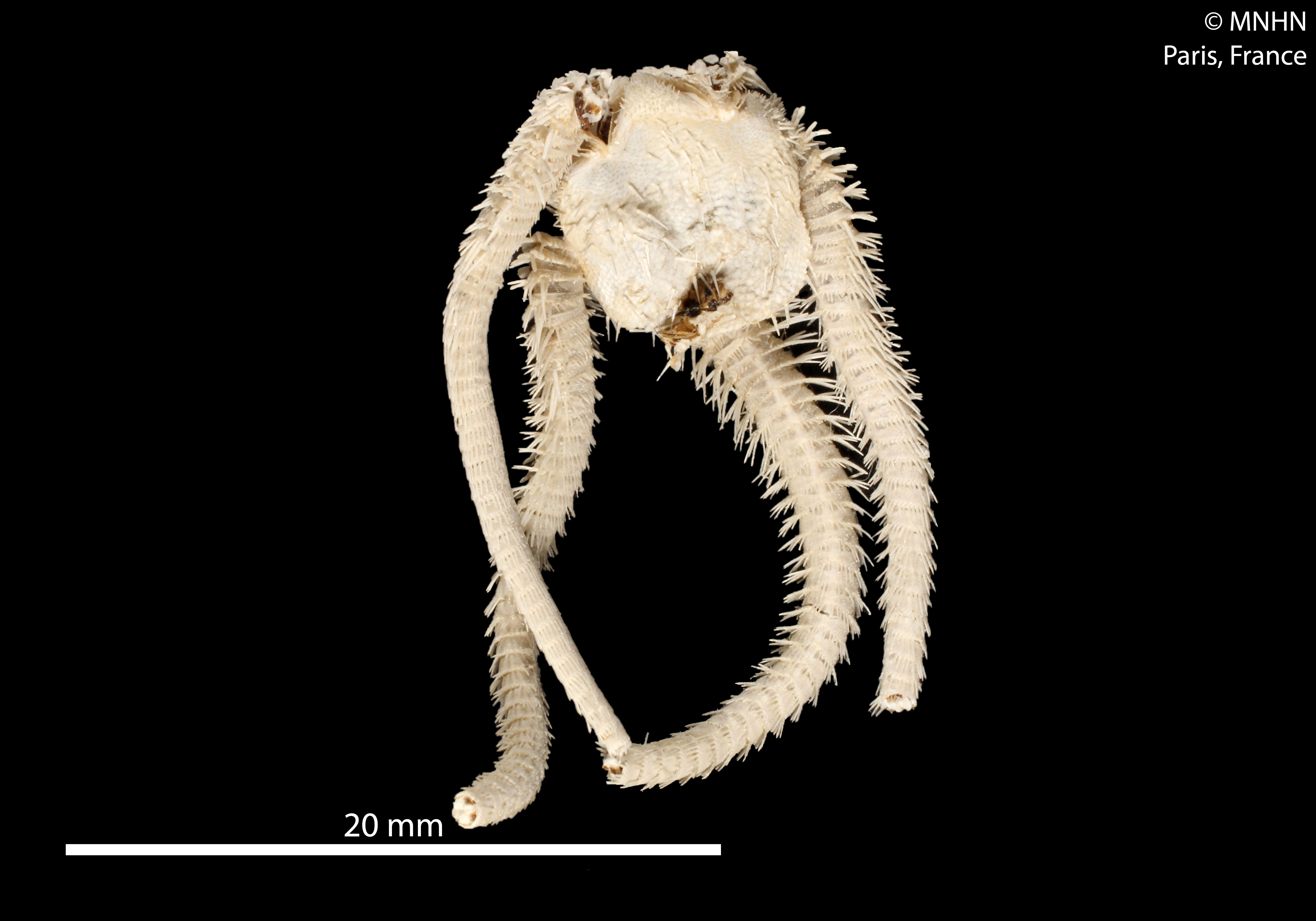
Ophiomyces frutectosus (Ophioscolecida)

=== Class Asteroidea (Starfish) ===
- Infraclass Concentricycloidea
  - Peripodida
- Superorder Forcipulatacea
  - Brisingida
  - Forcipulatida
- Superorder Spinulosacea
  - Spinulosida
- Superorder Valvatacea
  - Notomyotida
  - Paxillosida
  - Valvatida
- Velatida
- † Calliasterellidae
- † Trichasteropsida
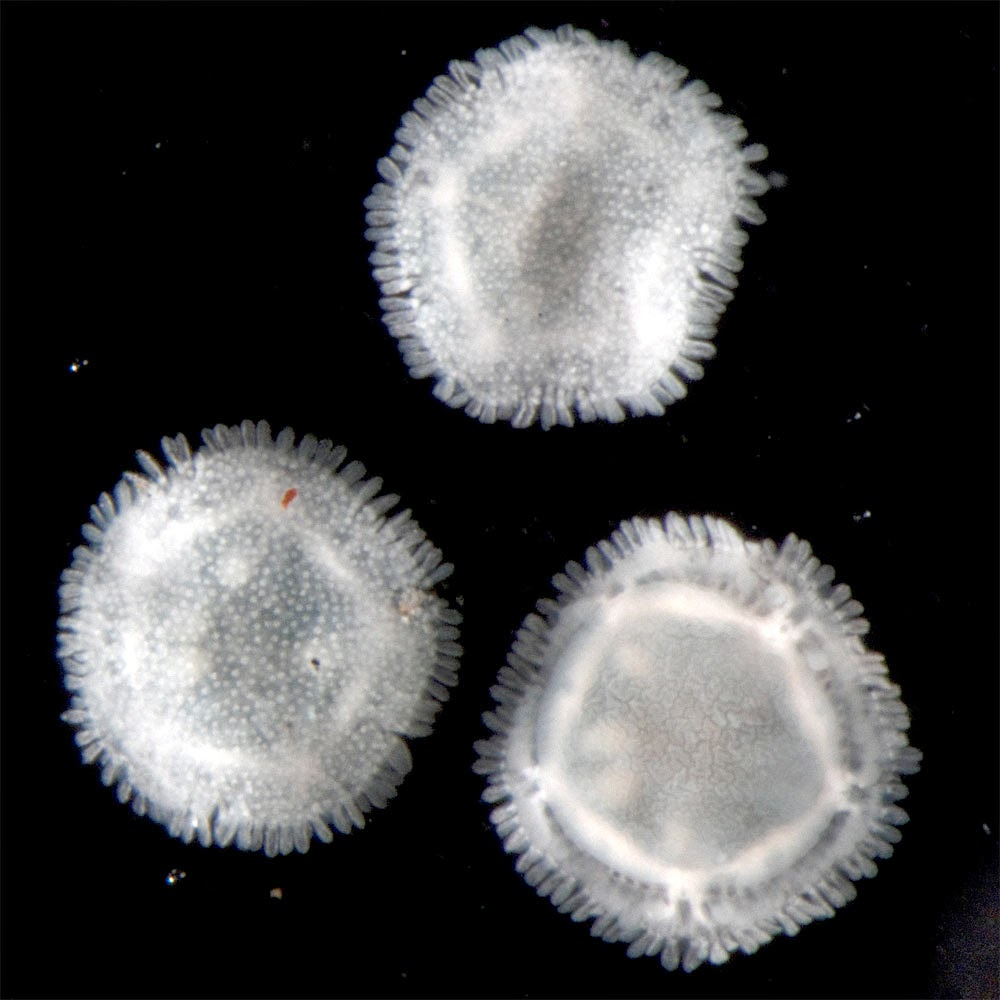
Xyloplax janetae (Peripodida)

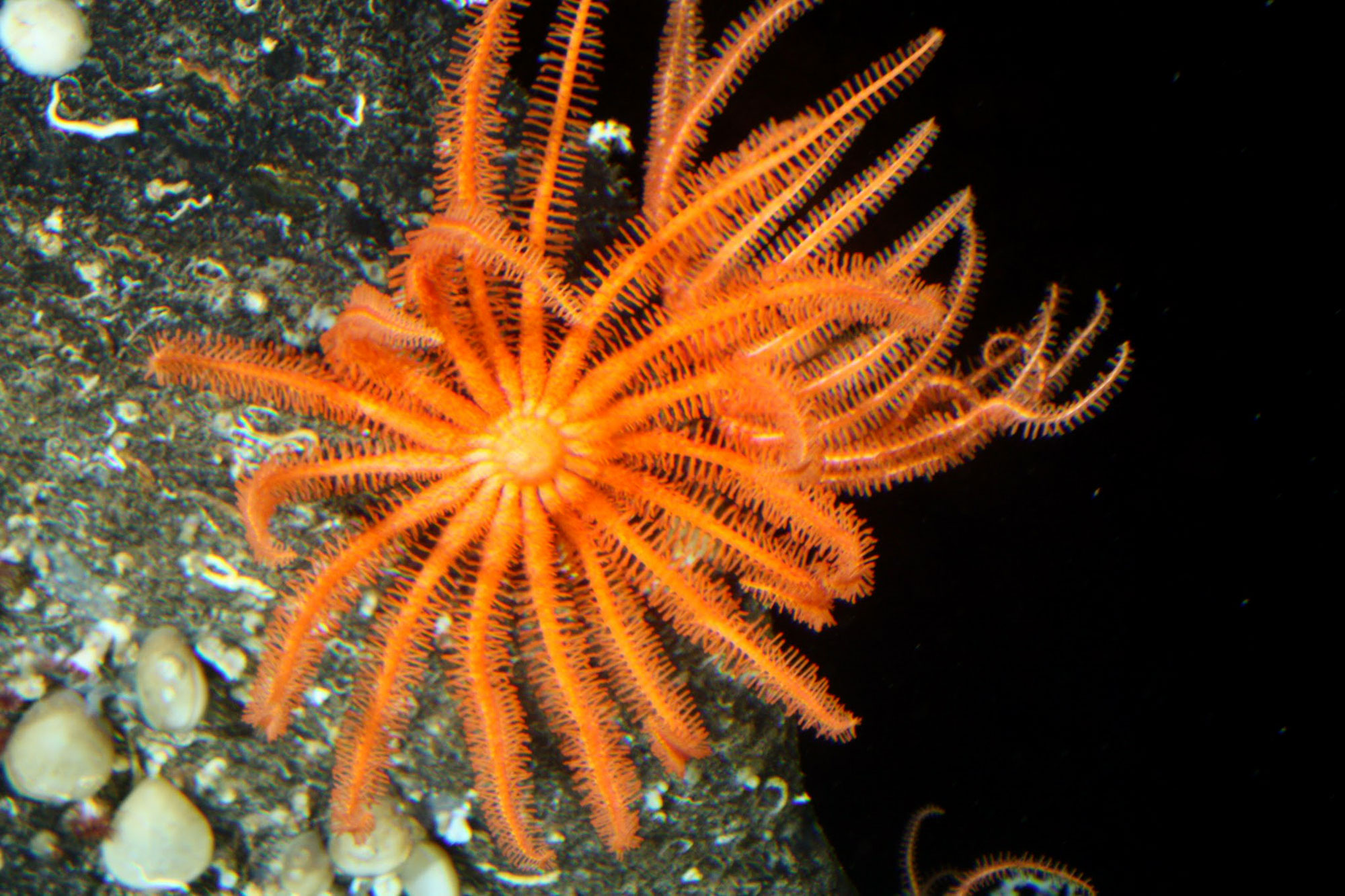
Novodinia antillensis (Brisingida)

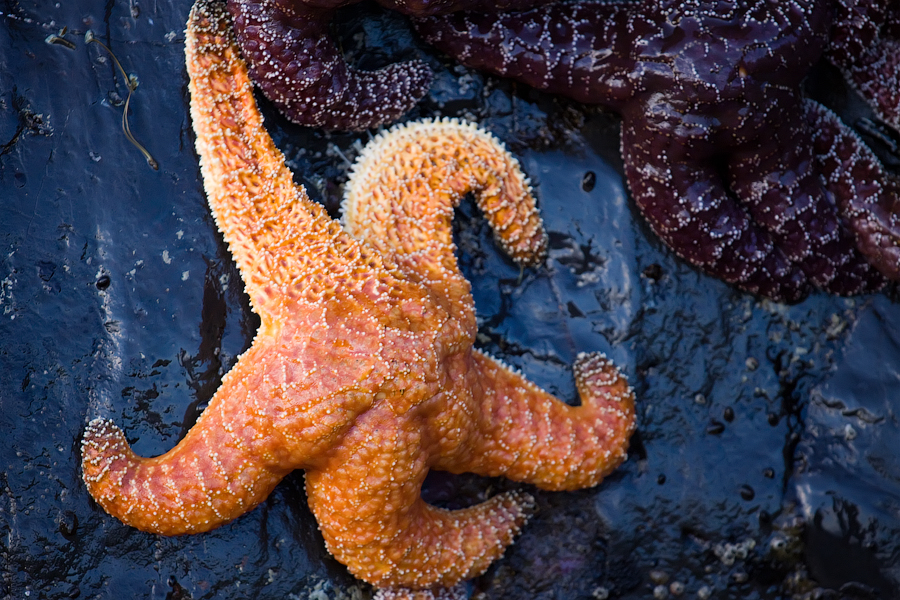
Pisaster ochraceus (Forcipulatida)

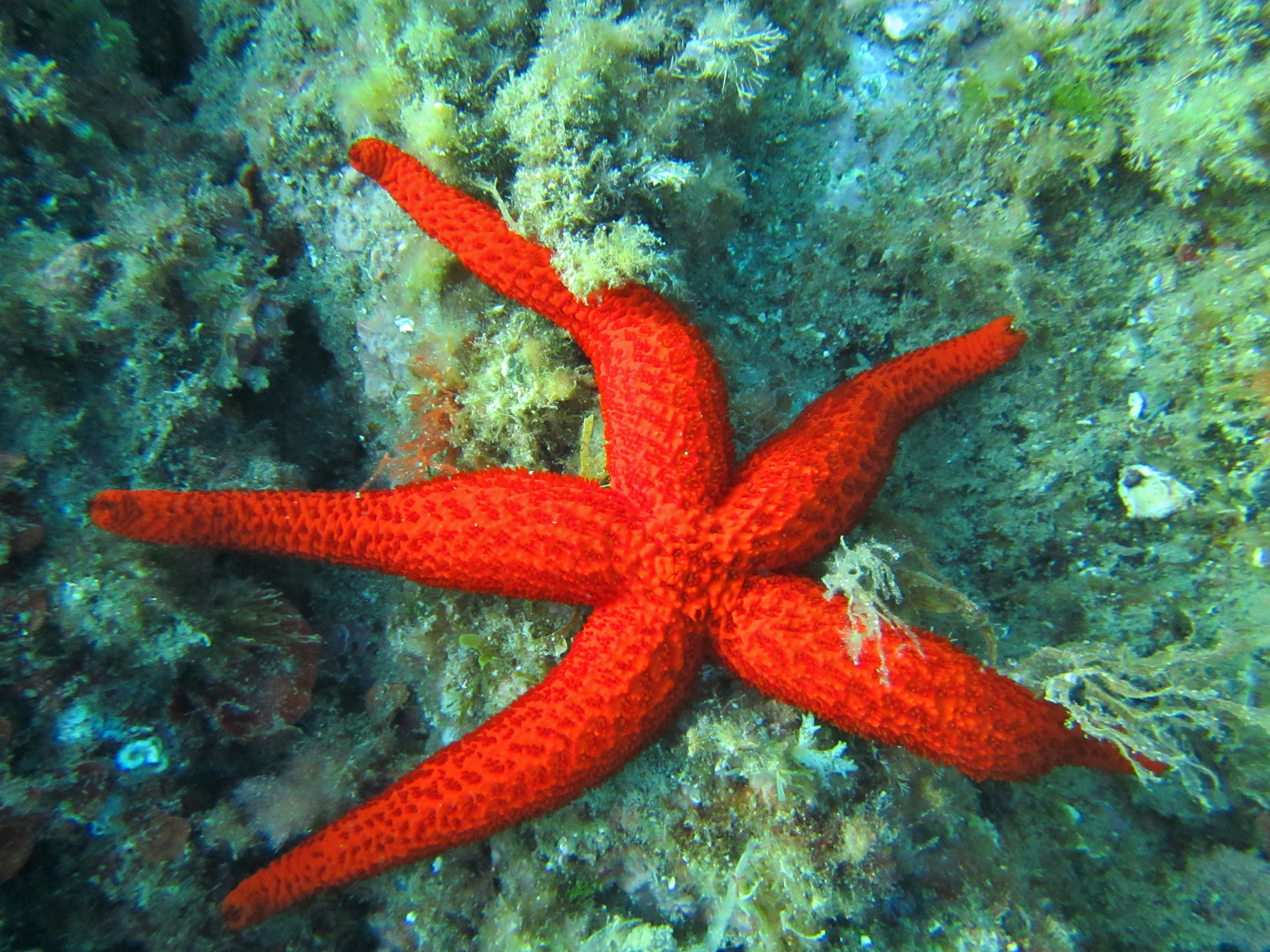
Echinaster sepositus (Spinulosida)

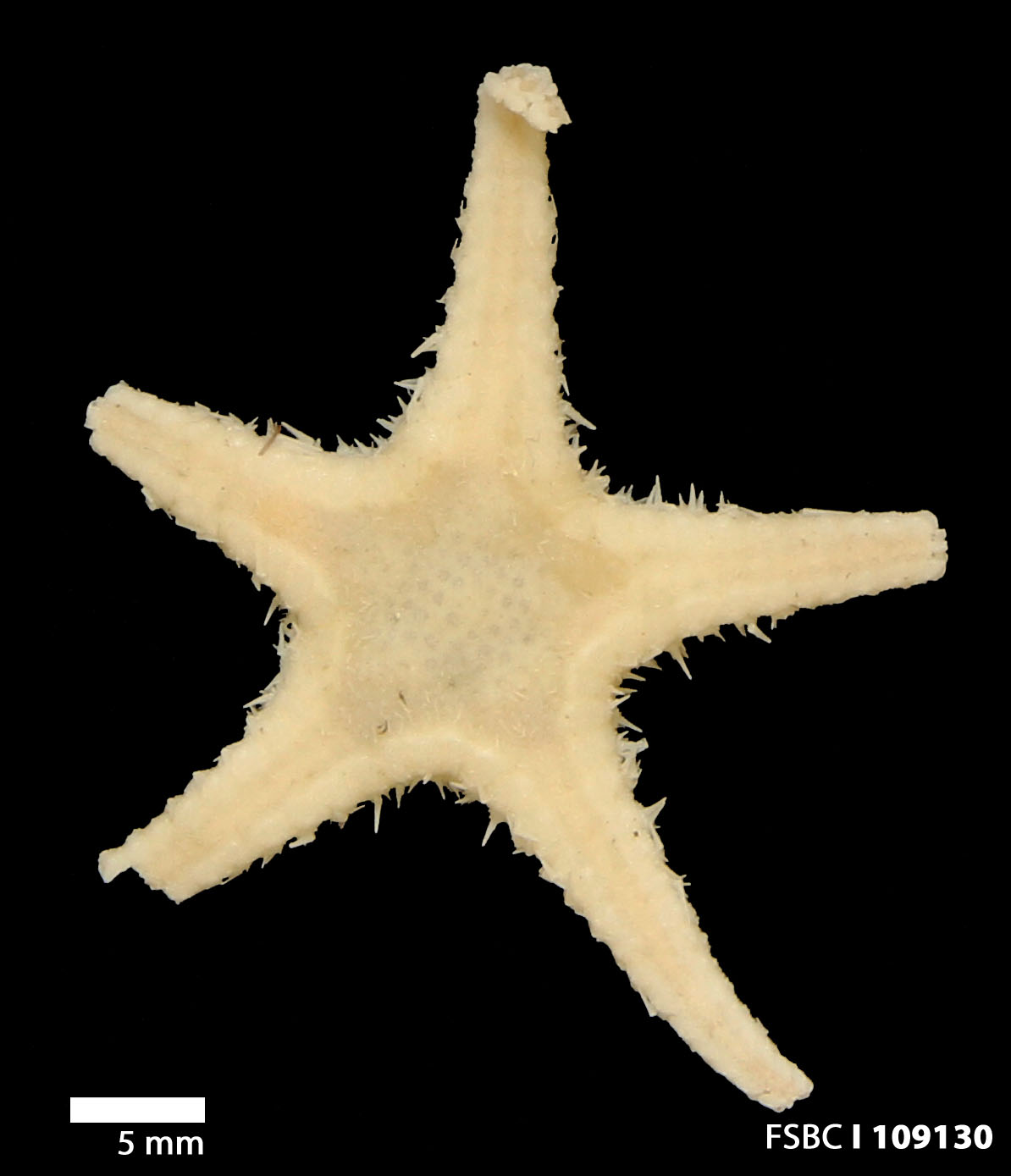
Cheiraster echinulatus (Notomyotida)

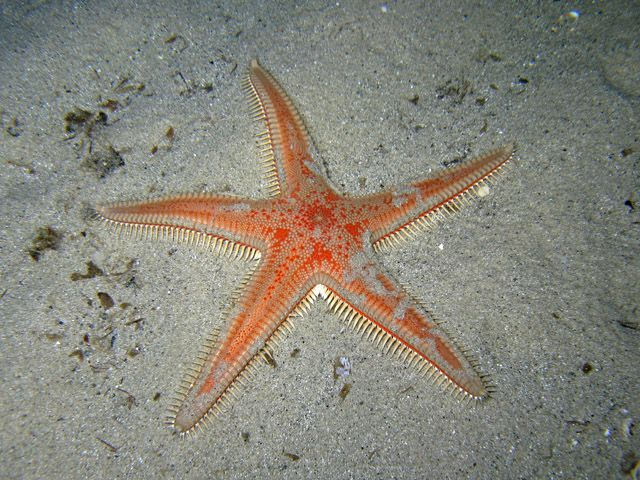
Astropecten aranciacus (Paxillosida)

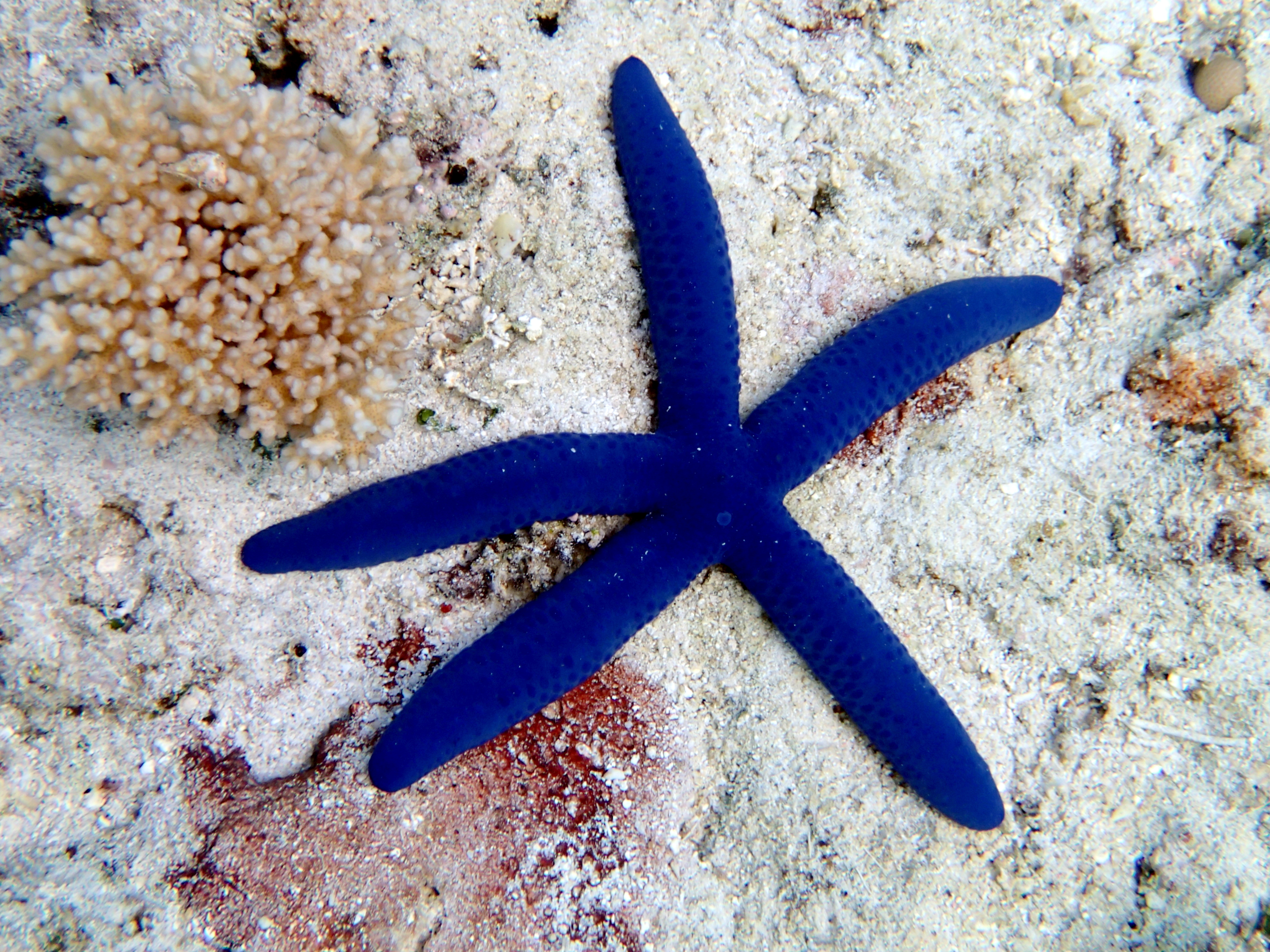
Linckia laevigata (Valvatida)

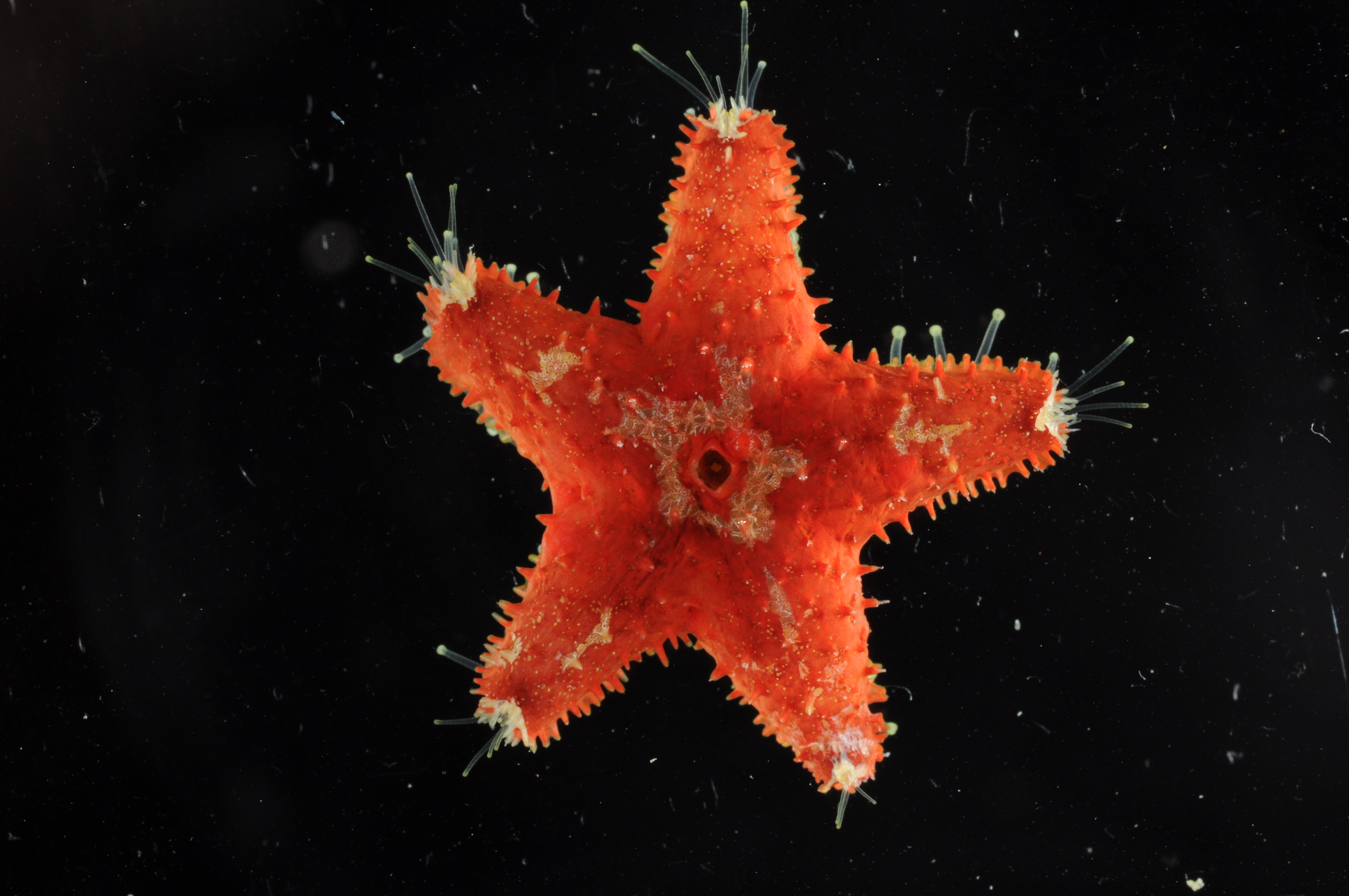
Euretaster insignis (Velatida)

== Subphylum Echinozoa ==
=== Class Echinoidea (Sea urchins) ===
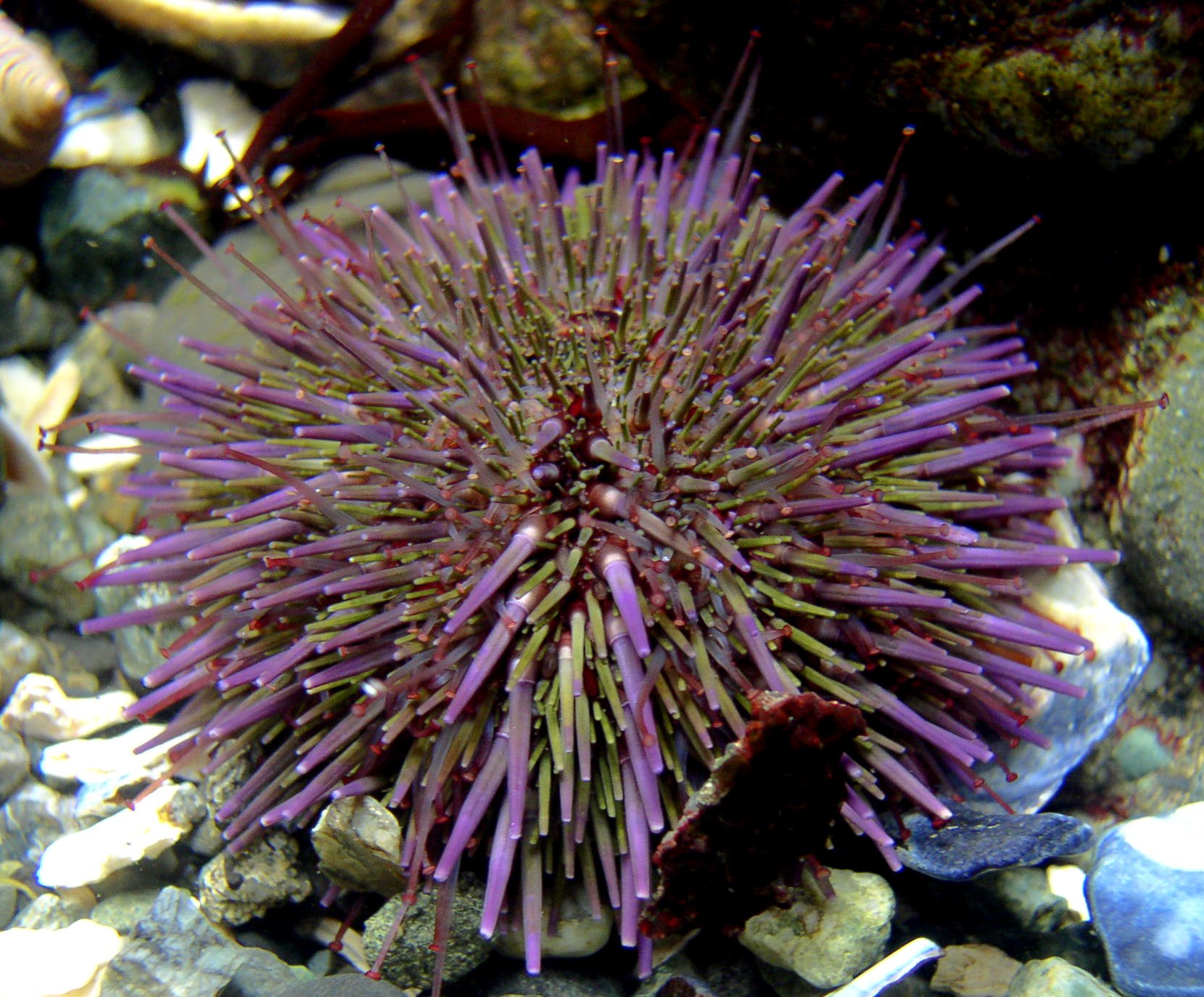
Strongylocentrotus purpuratus, a well-armoured sea urchin

- Superorder Diadematacea
  - Order Diadematoida
  - Order Echinothurioida
  - Order Pedinoida
- Superorder Echinacea
  - Order Arbacioida
  - Order Echinoida
  - Order Phymosomatoida
  - Order Salenioida
  - Order Temnopleuroida
- Superorder Gnathostomata
  - Order Clypeasteroida (sand dollars)
  - Order Holectypoida
- Superorder Atelostomata
  - Order Holasteroida
  - Order Spatangoida (heart urchins)
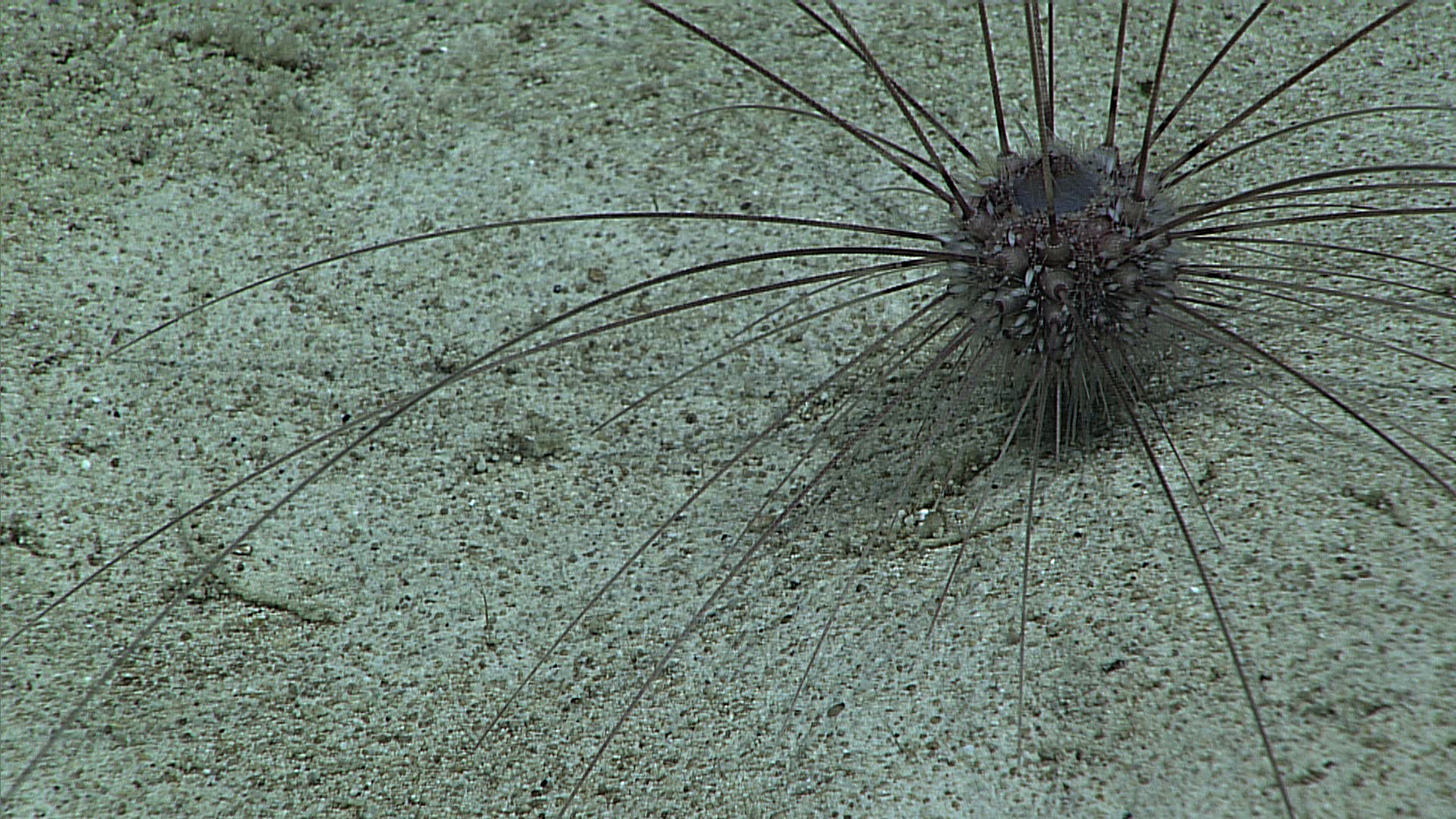
Aspidodiadema hawaiiense, an Aspidodiadematoida

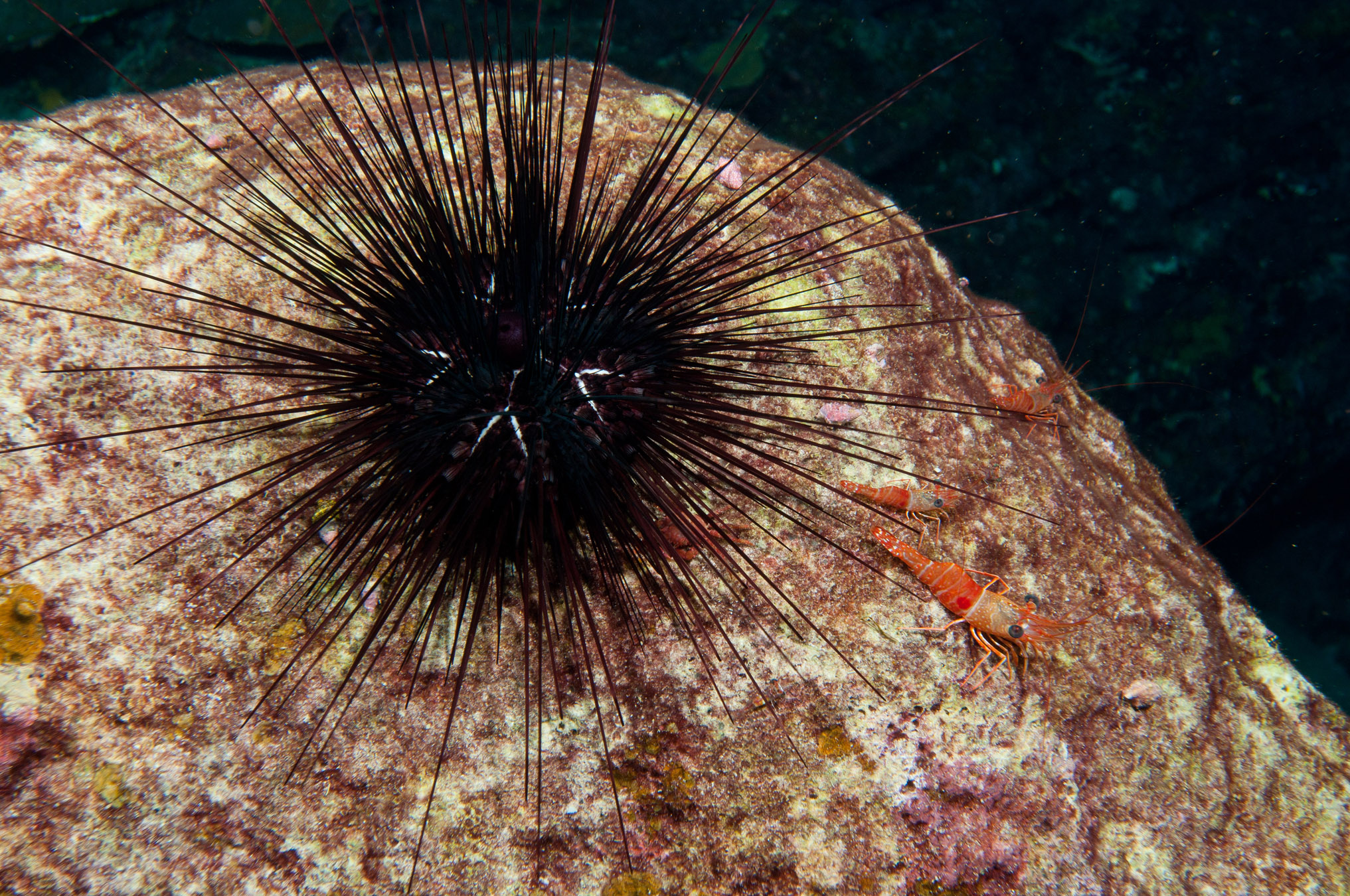
Diadema antillarum, a Diadematoida

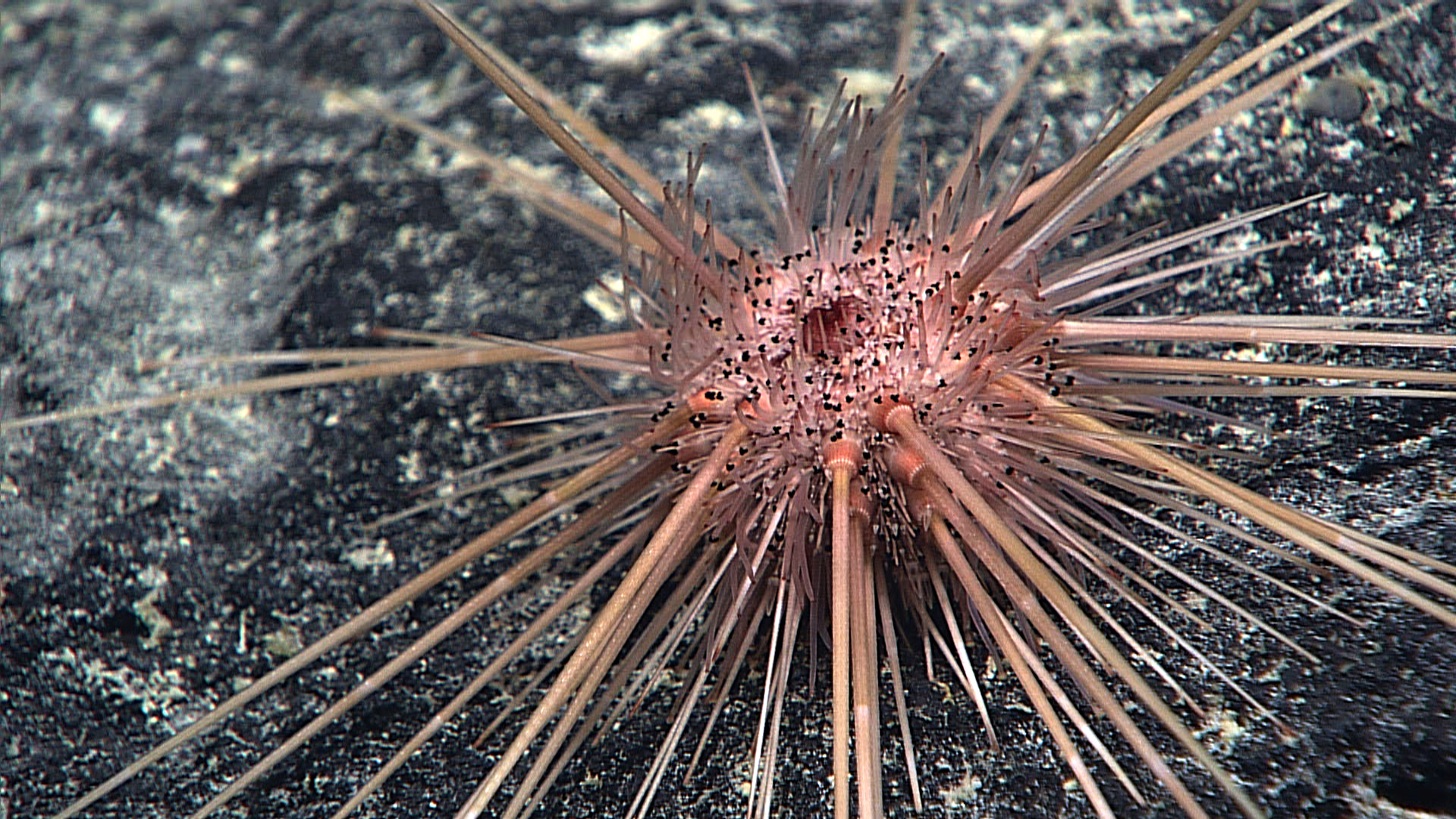
Caenopedina hawaiiensis, a Pedinoida

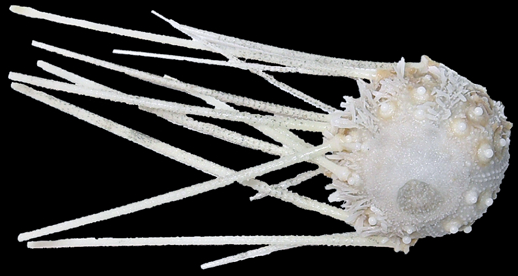
Salenocidaris hastigera, a Salenioida

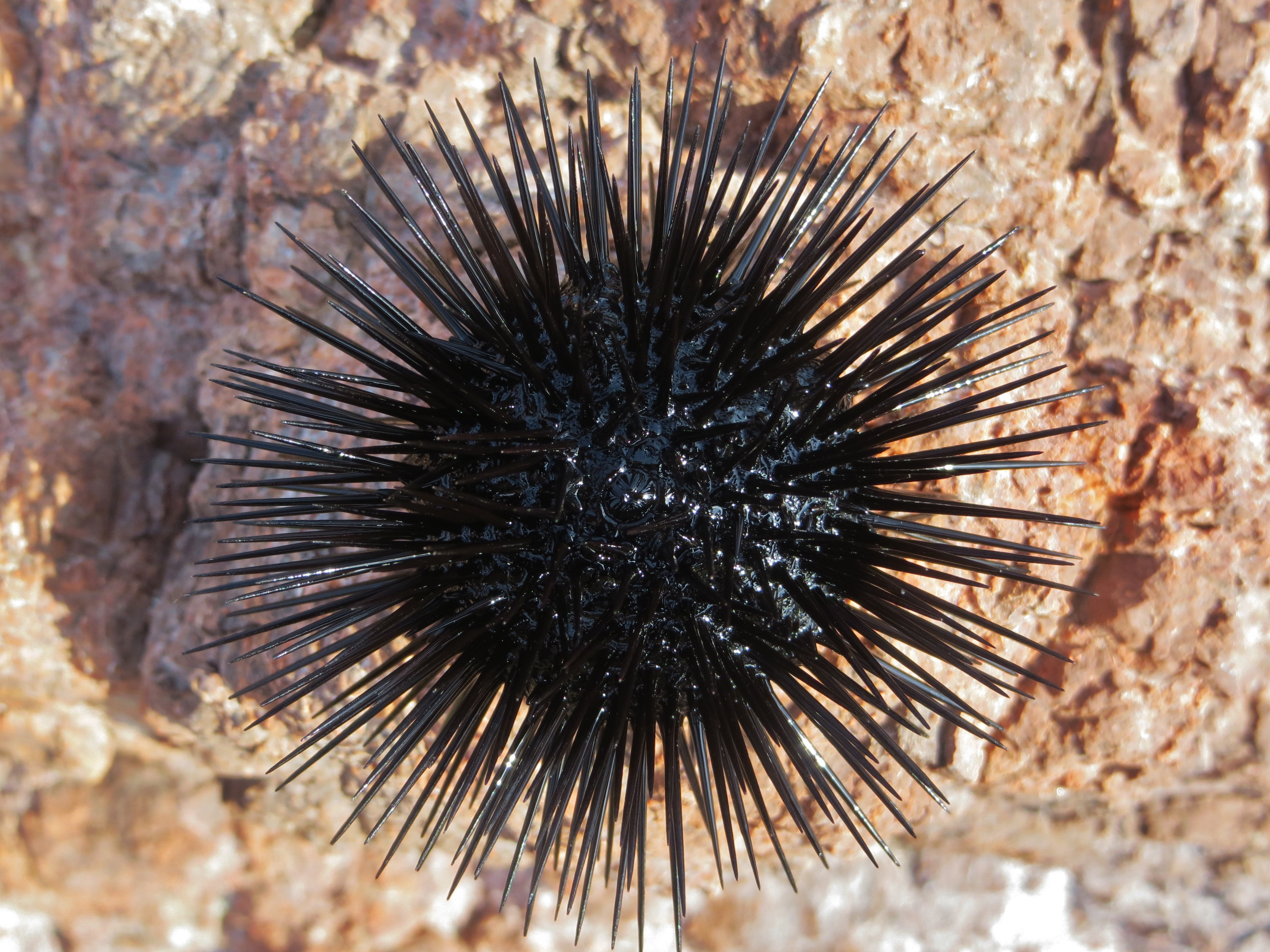
Arbacia lixula, an Arbacioida

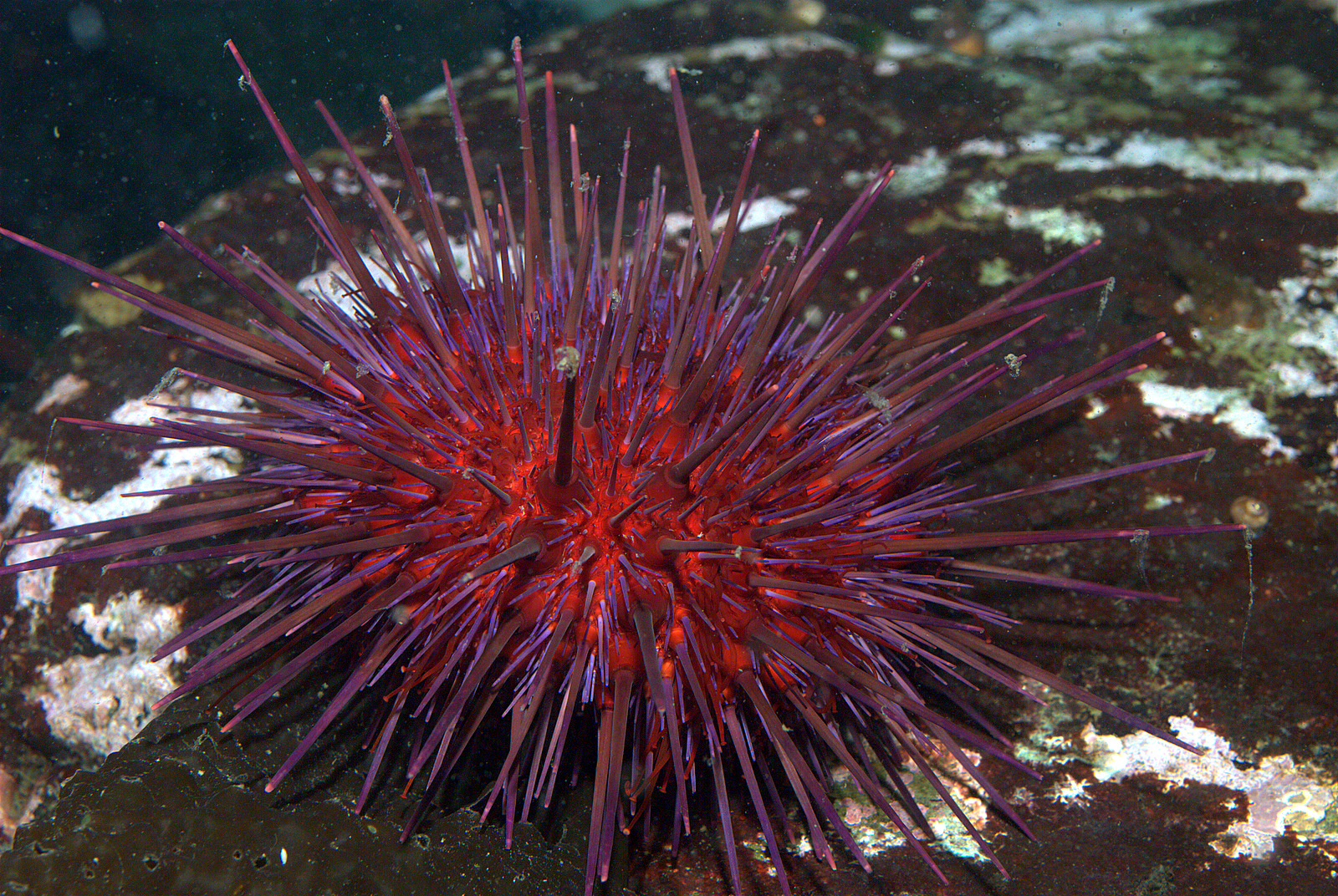
Strongylocentrotus franciscanus, a Camarodonta

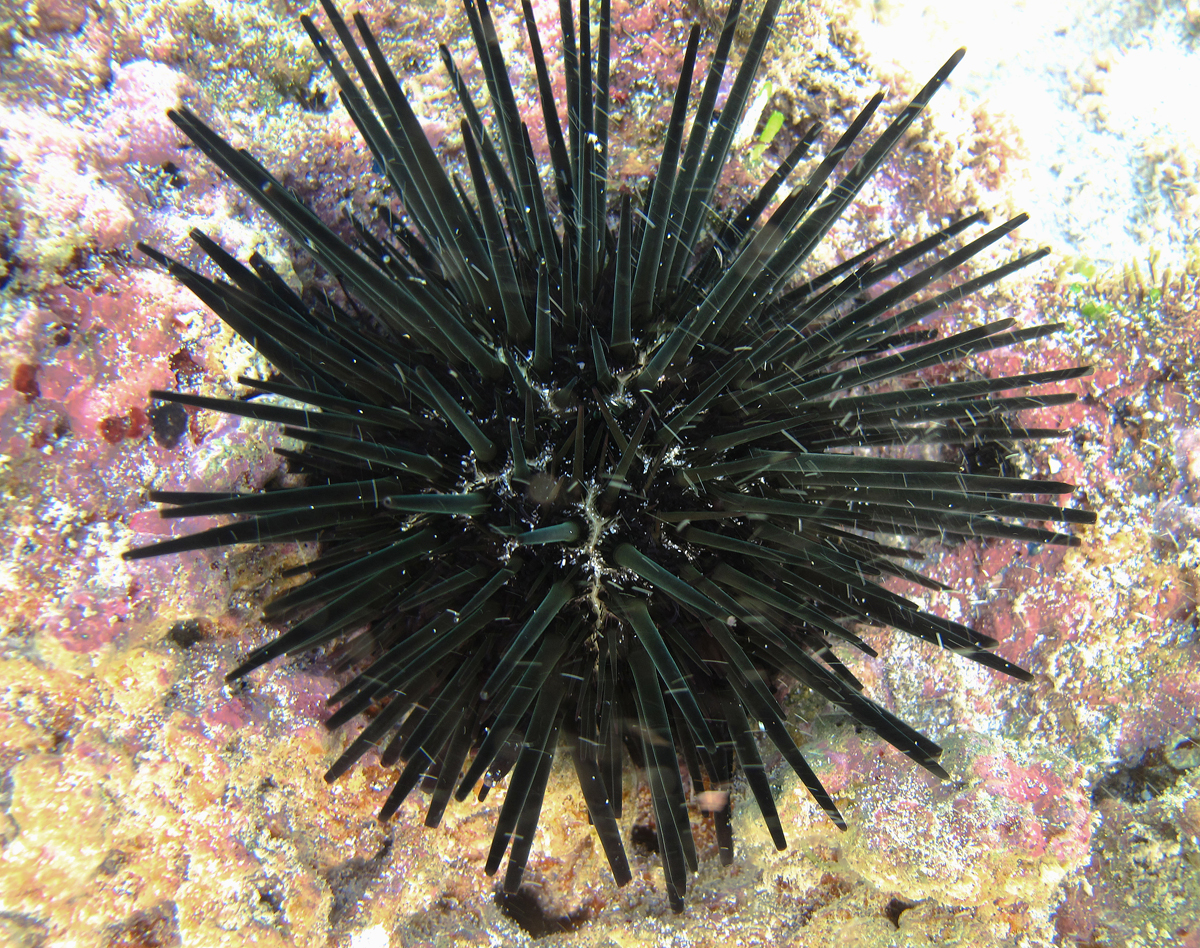
Stomopneustes variolaris, a Stomopneustoida

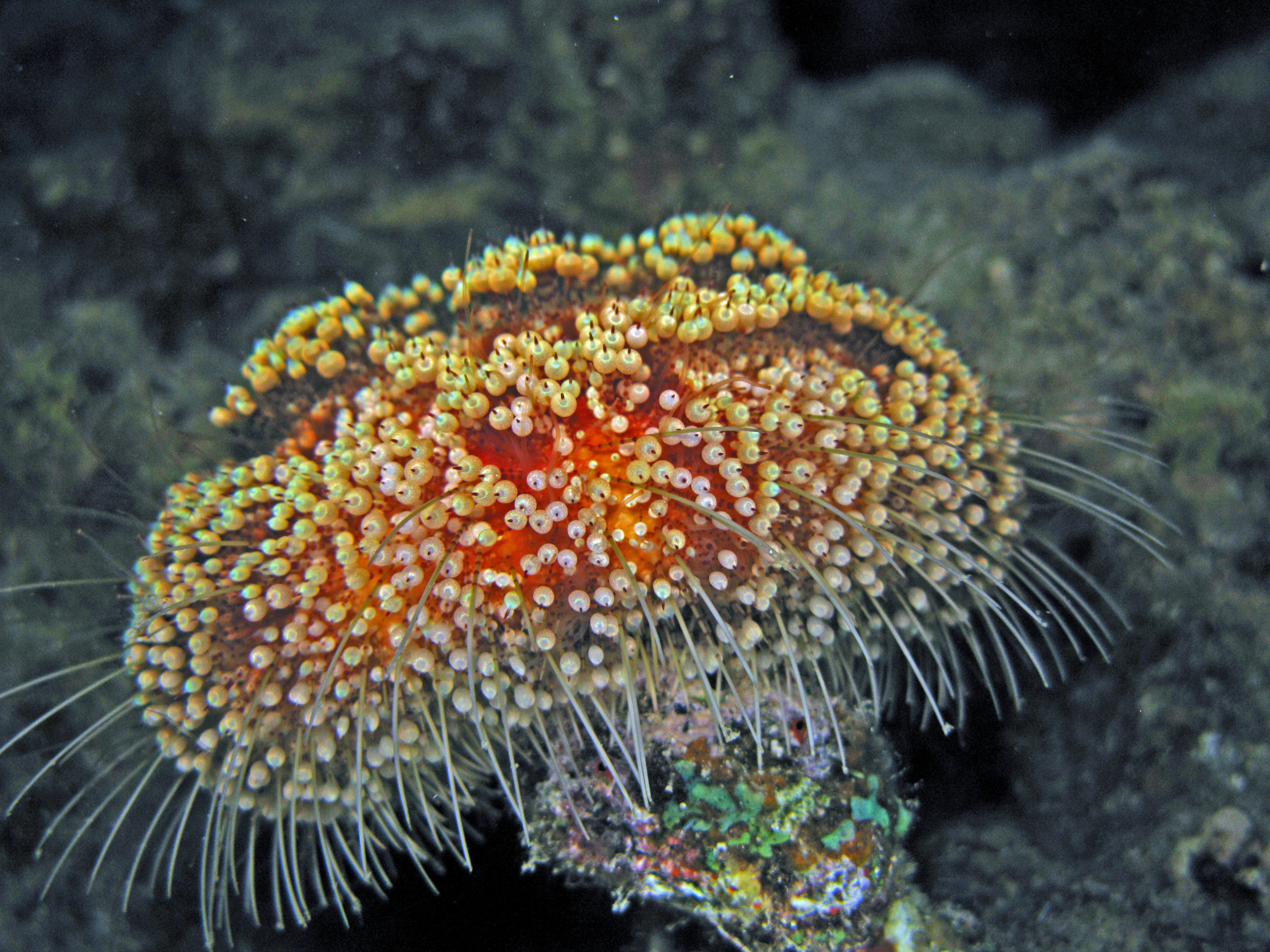
Asthenosoma marisrubri, an Echinothurioida

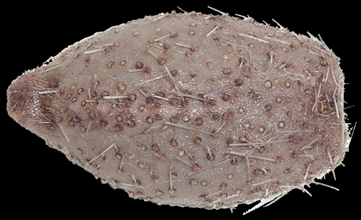
Pourtalesia wandeli, a Holasteroida

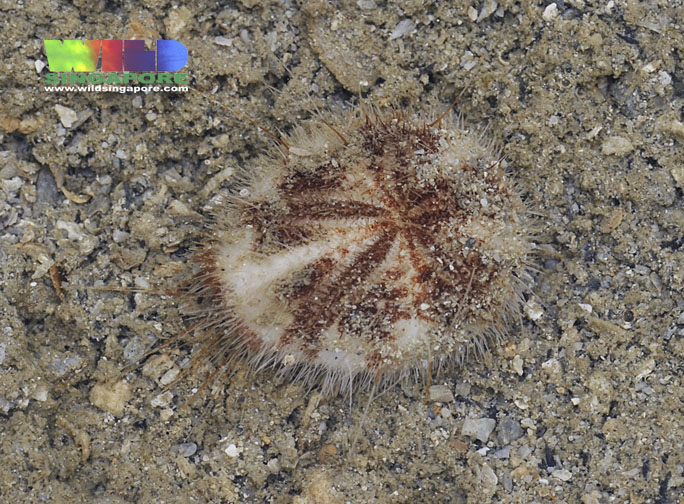
Maretia planulata, a Spatangoida

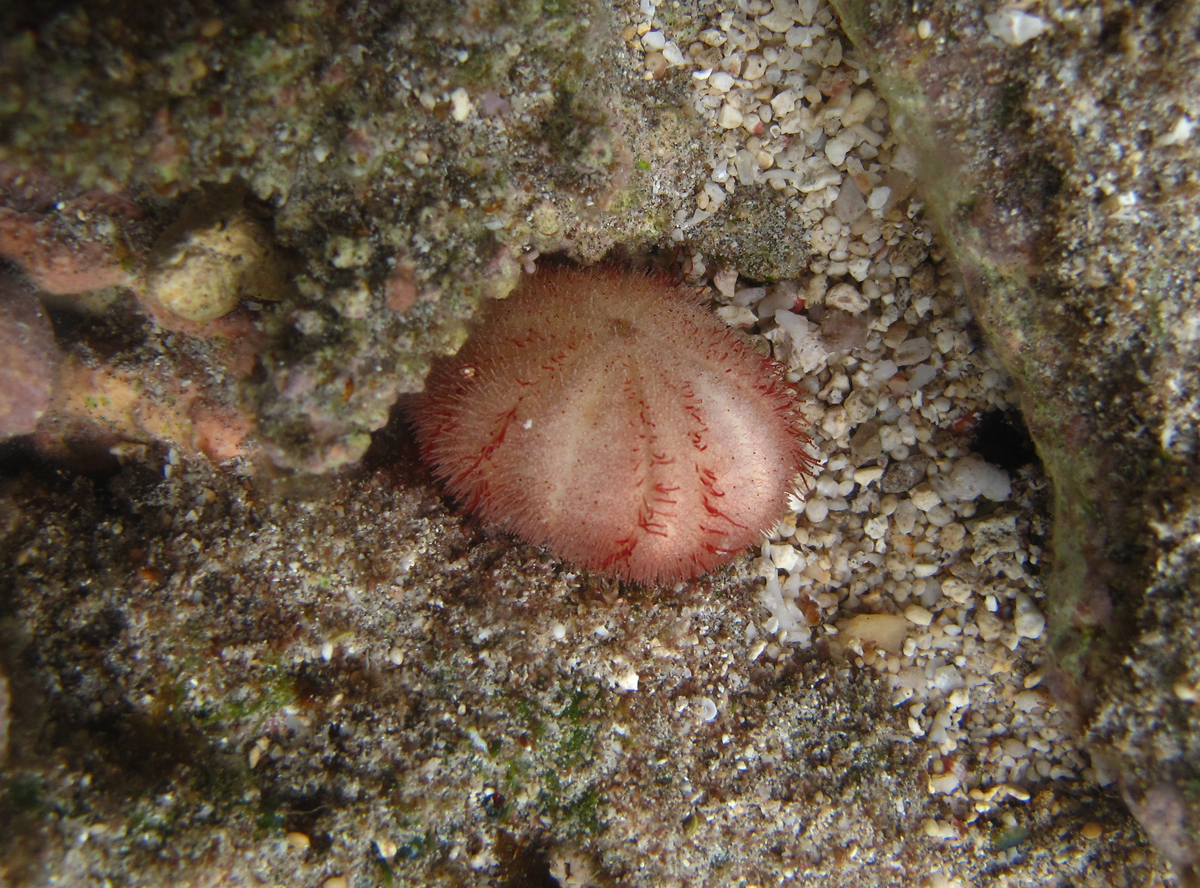
Echinoneus cyclostomus, an Echinoneoida

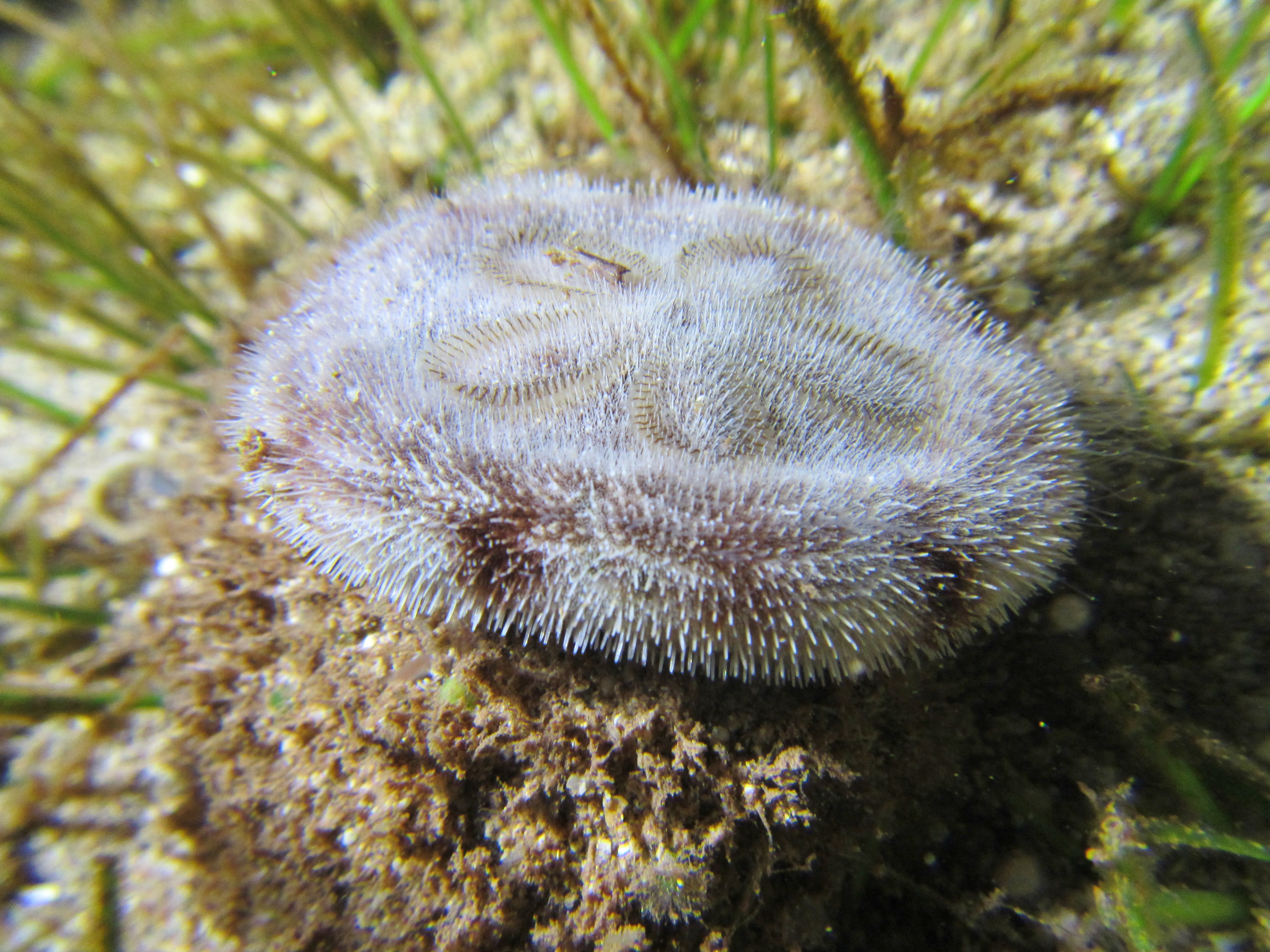
Clypeaster reticulatus, a Clypeasteroida

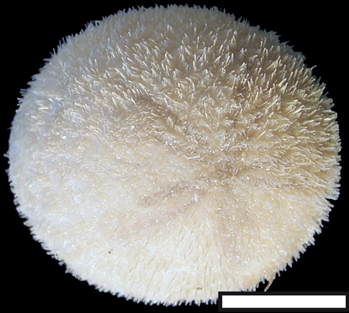
Echinolampas depressa, an Echinolampadoida

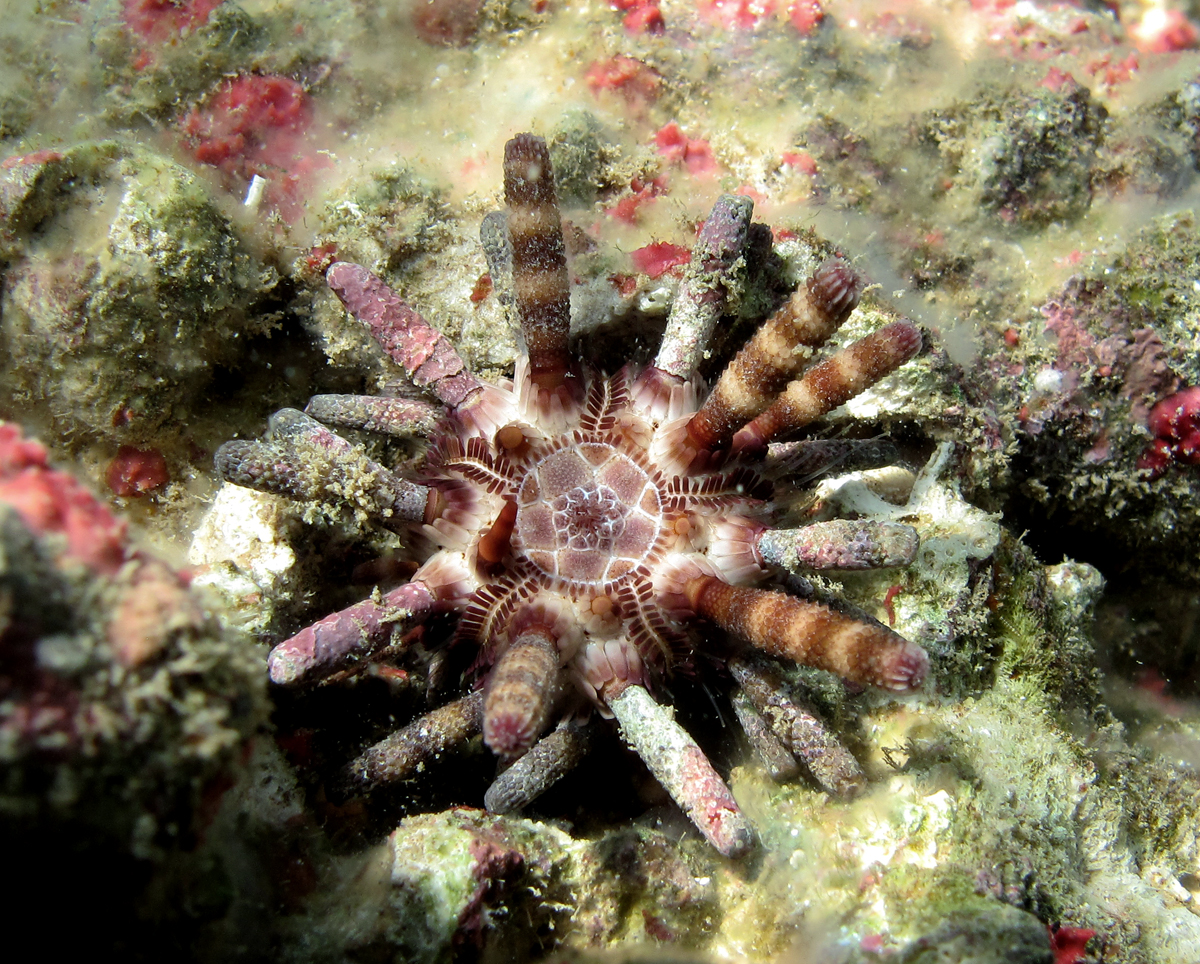
Eucidaris metularia, a Cidaroida

=== Class Holothuroidea (Sea cucumbers) ===
- Order Apodida
- Order Dendrochirotida
- Order Elasipodida
- Order Holothuriida
- Order Molpadida
- Order Persiculida
- Order Synallactida
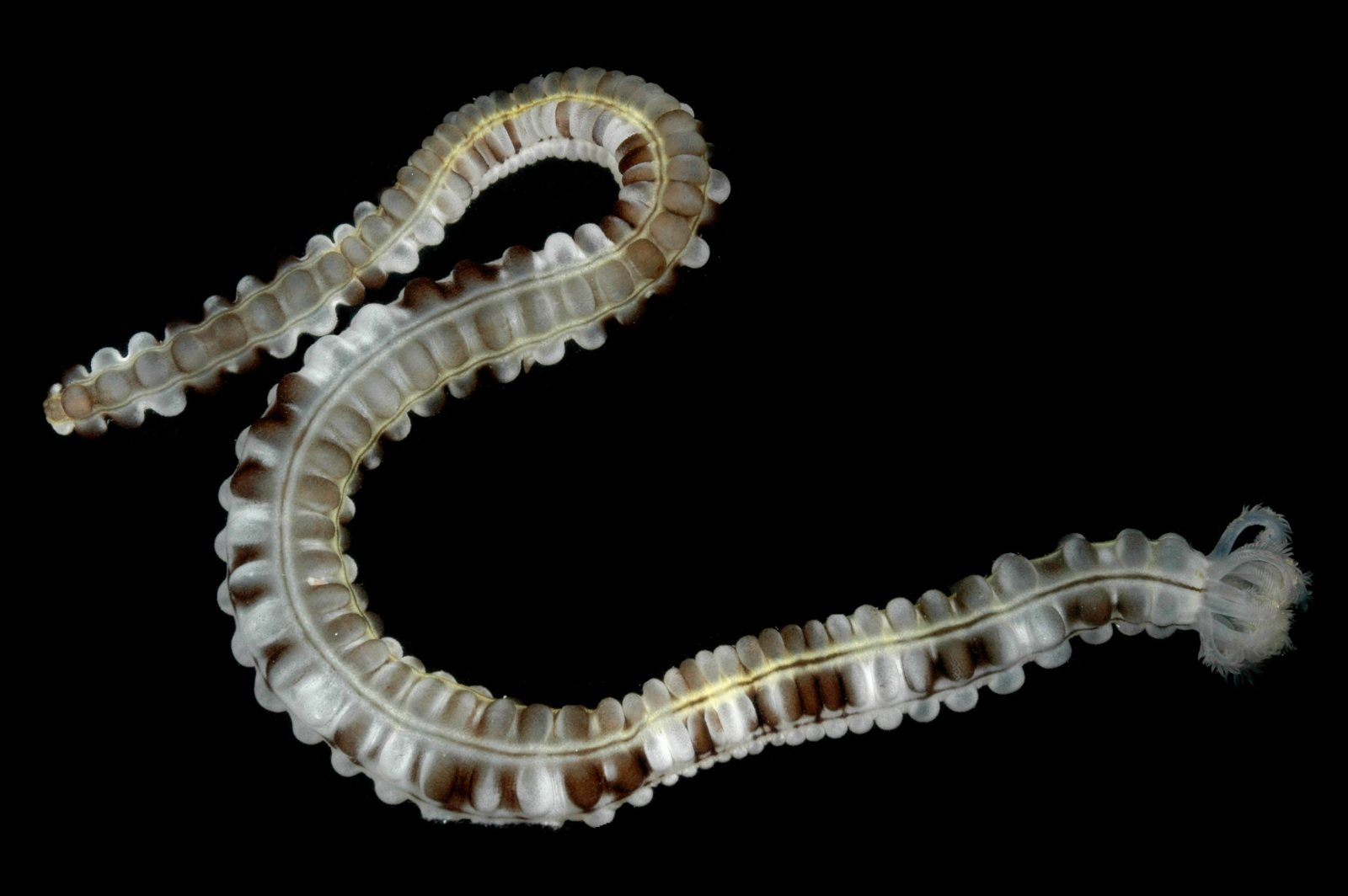
Euapta godeffroyi (Apodida)

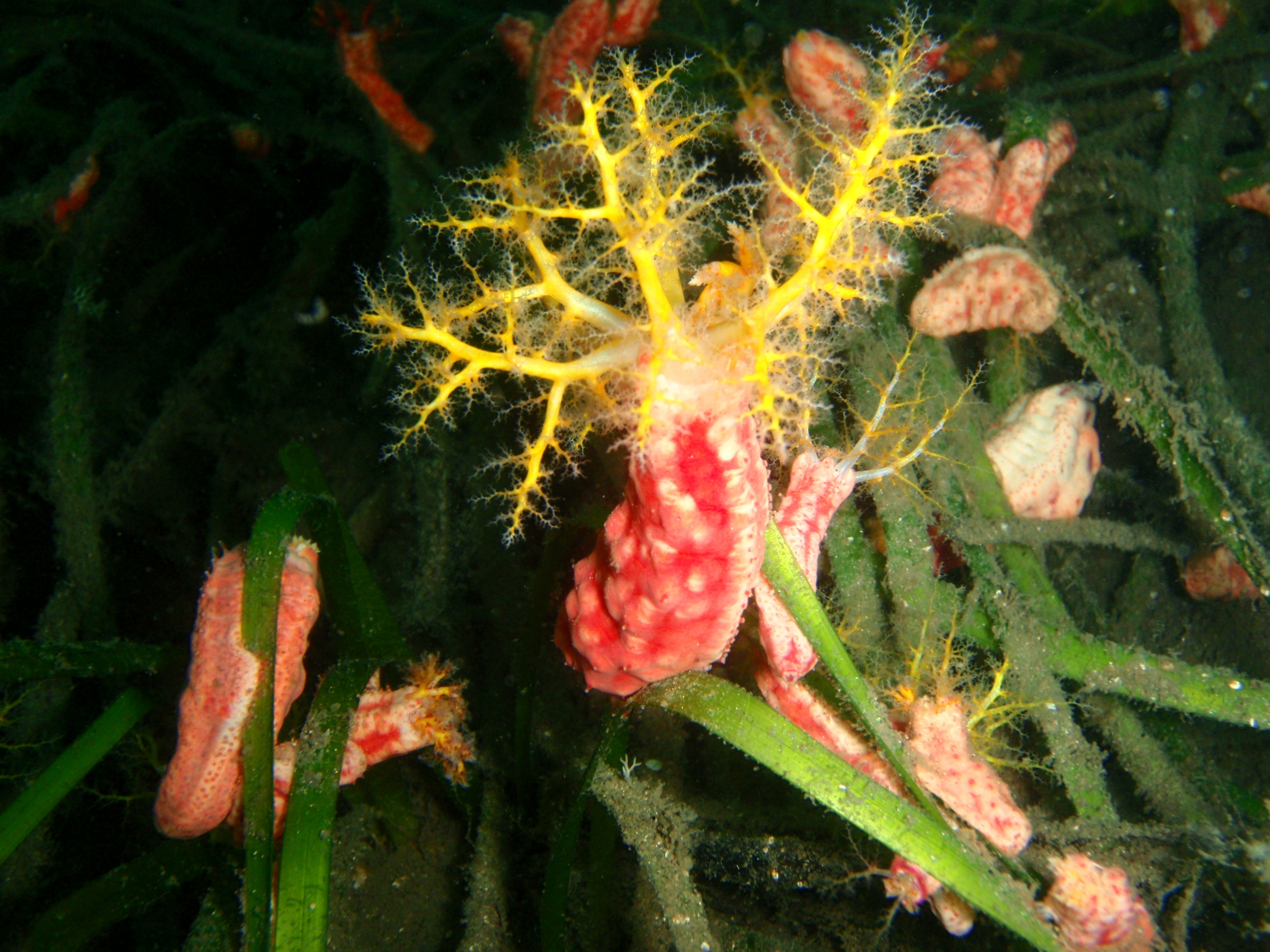
Cercodemas anceps (Dendrochirotida)

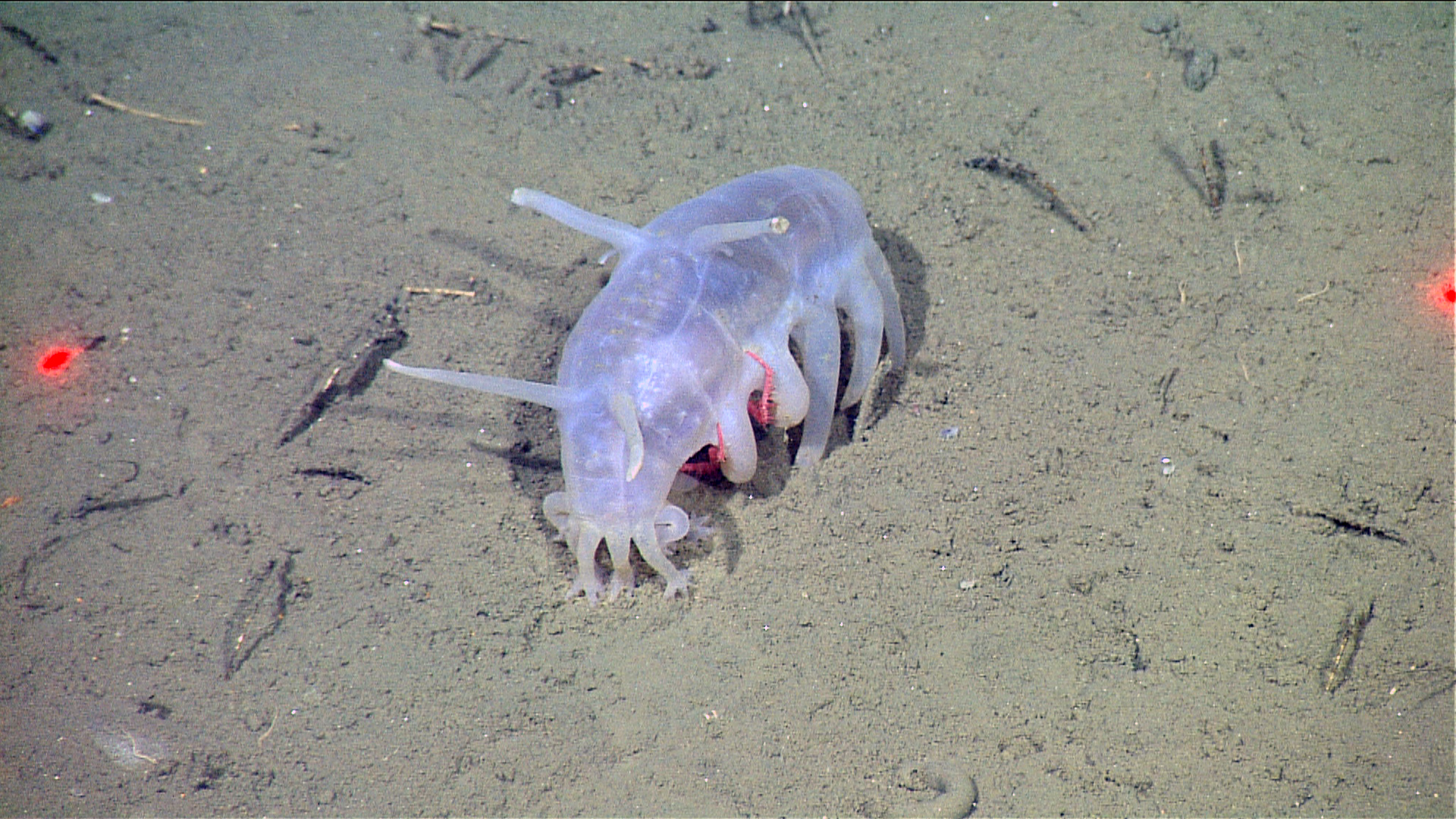
Scotoplanes globosa (Elasipodida)

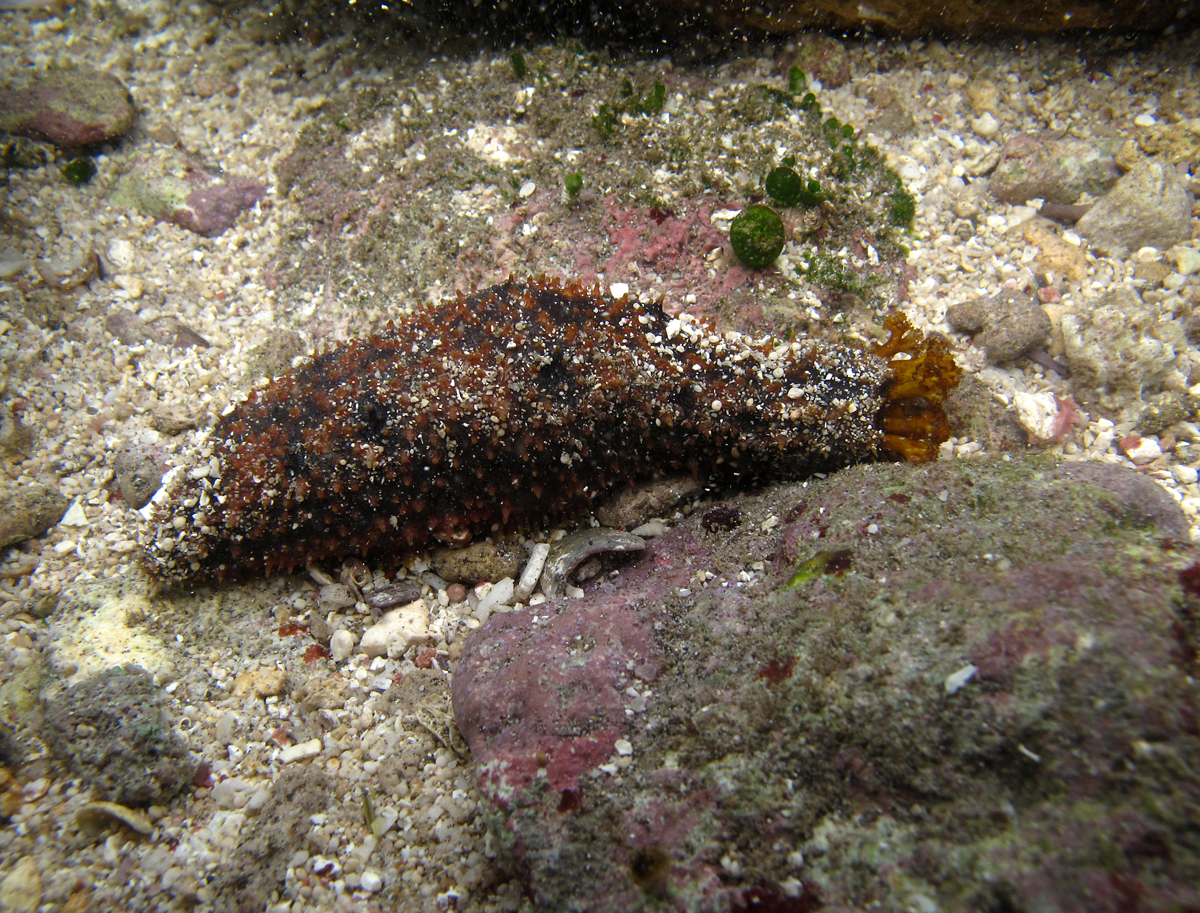
Holothuria cinerascens (Holothuriida)

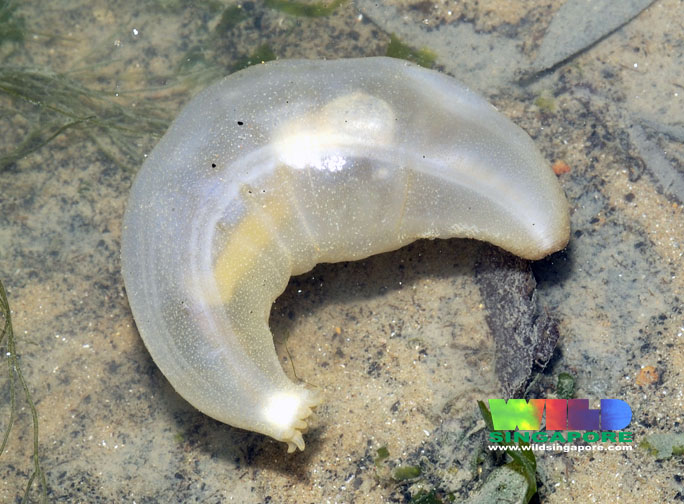
Paracaudina australis (Molpadida)

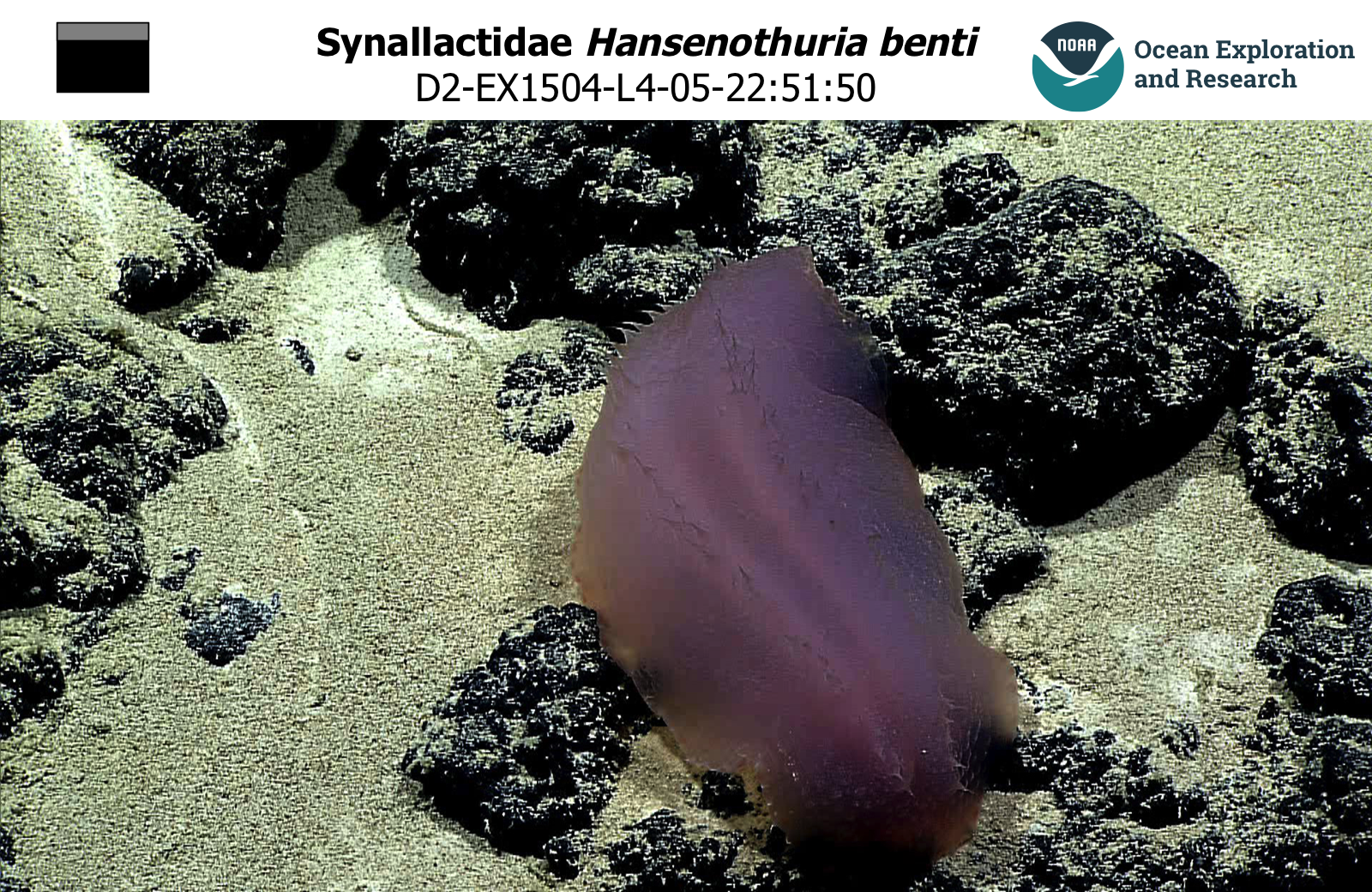
Hansenothuria benti (Persiculida)

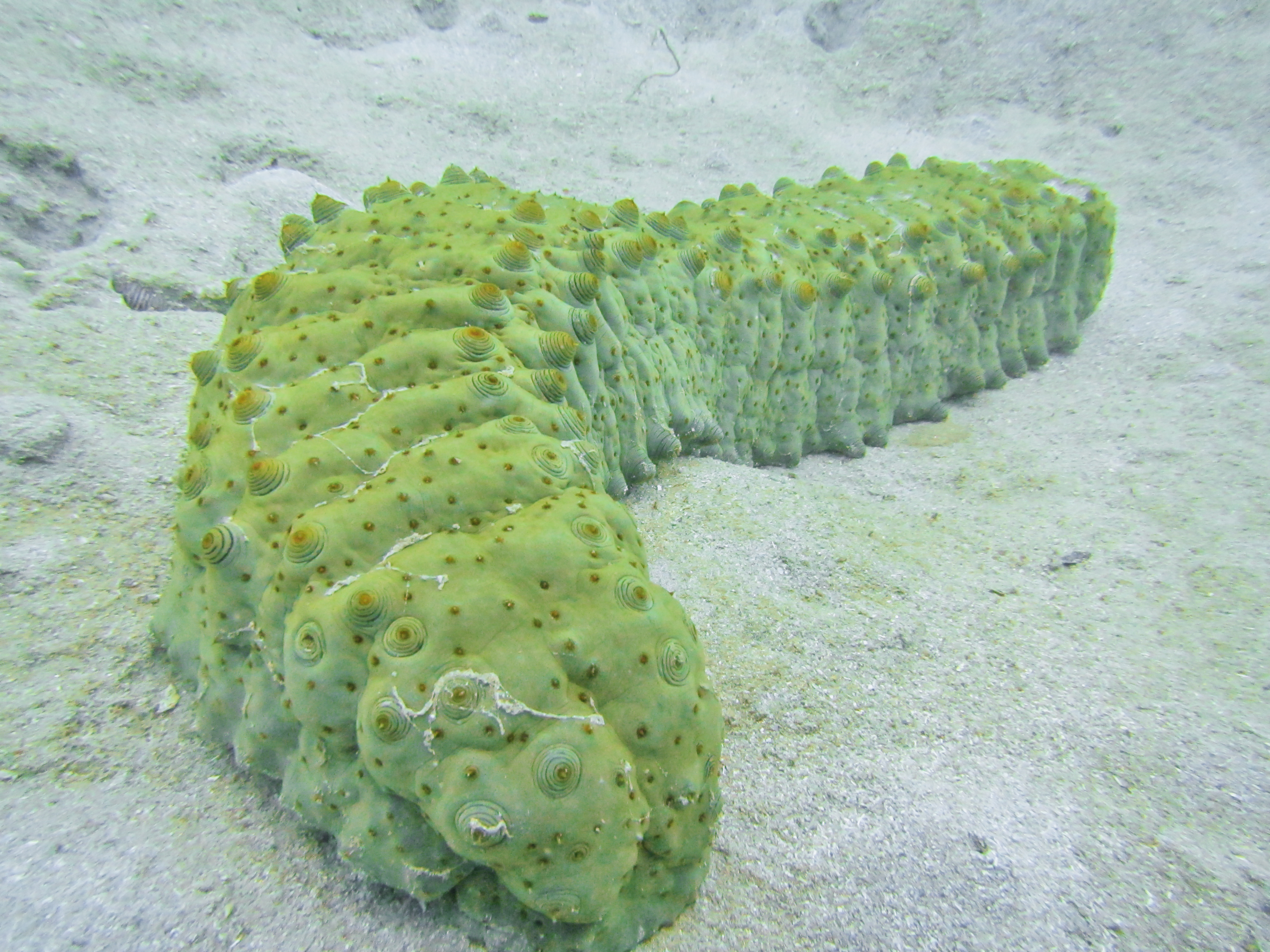
Stichopus herrmanni (Synallactida)

=== Class Ophiocistioidea † ===
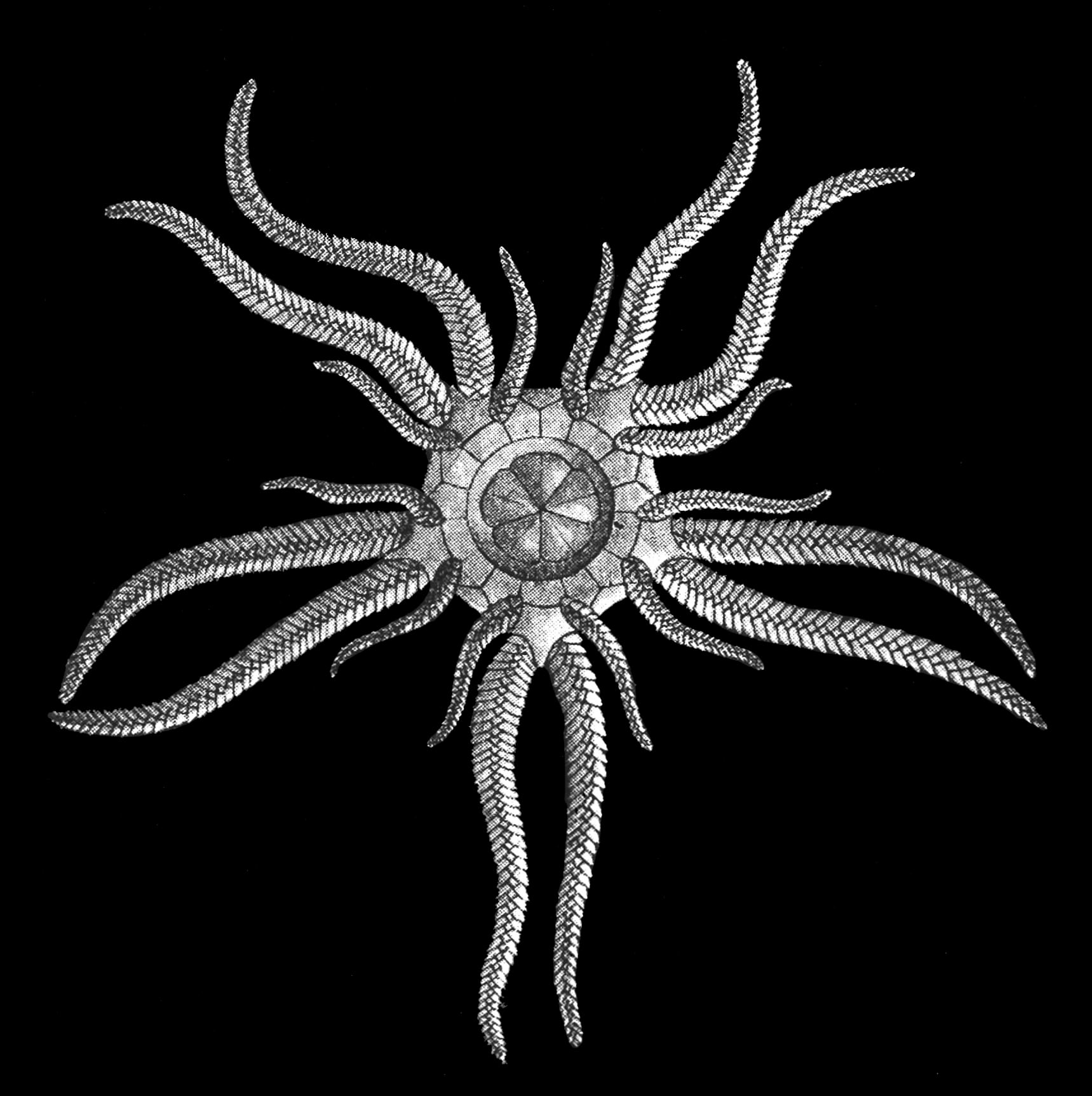
Euthemon

No orders recognized: class is divided up into four families, Eucladiidae, Sollasiniidae, Volchoviidae, and Rhenosquamidae. The inclusion of Rhenosquamidae within Ophiocistioidea is doubtful, as the organs identified in fossils of Rhenosquamus as the characteristic "scaly podia" otherwise diagnostic of ophiocistioids may not, in fact, be such structures.

=== Class Edrioasteroidea † ===
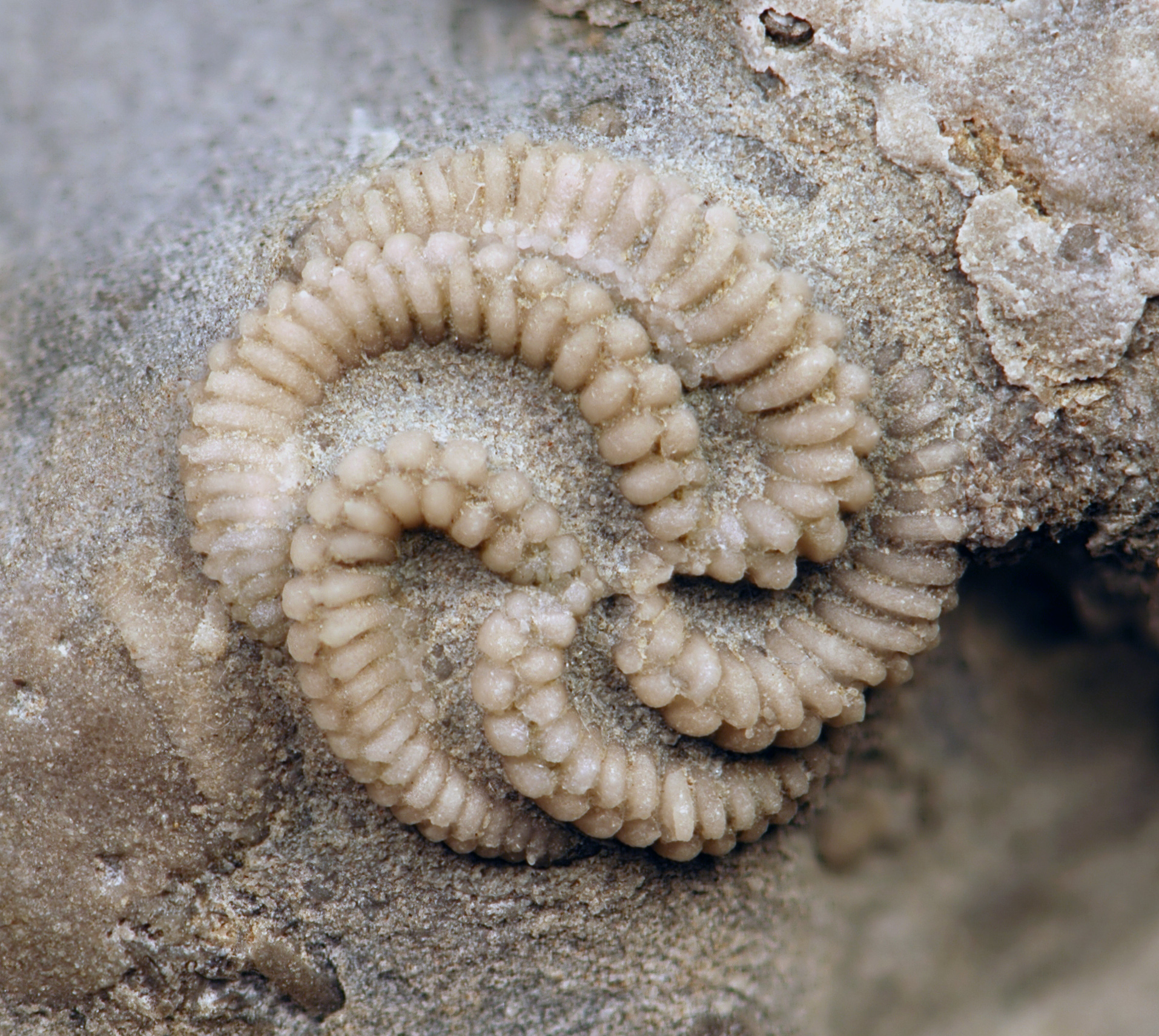
Streptaster vorticellatus (Edrioasteroidea)

- order Stromatocystitida
- order Edrioasterida
- order Isorophida

=== Class Helicoplacoidea † ===
No known orders, 2 known species, Helicoplacus curtisi and H. guthi

== Subphylum Blastozoa ==
=== Class Blastoidea † ===
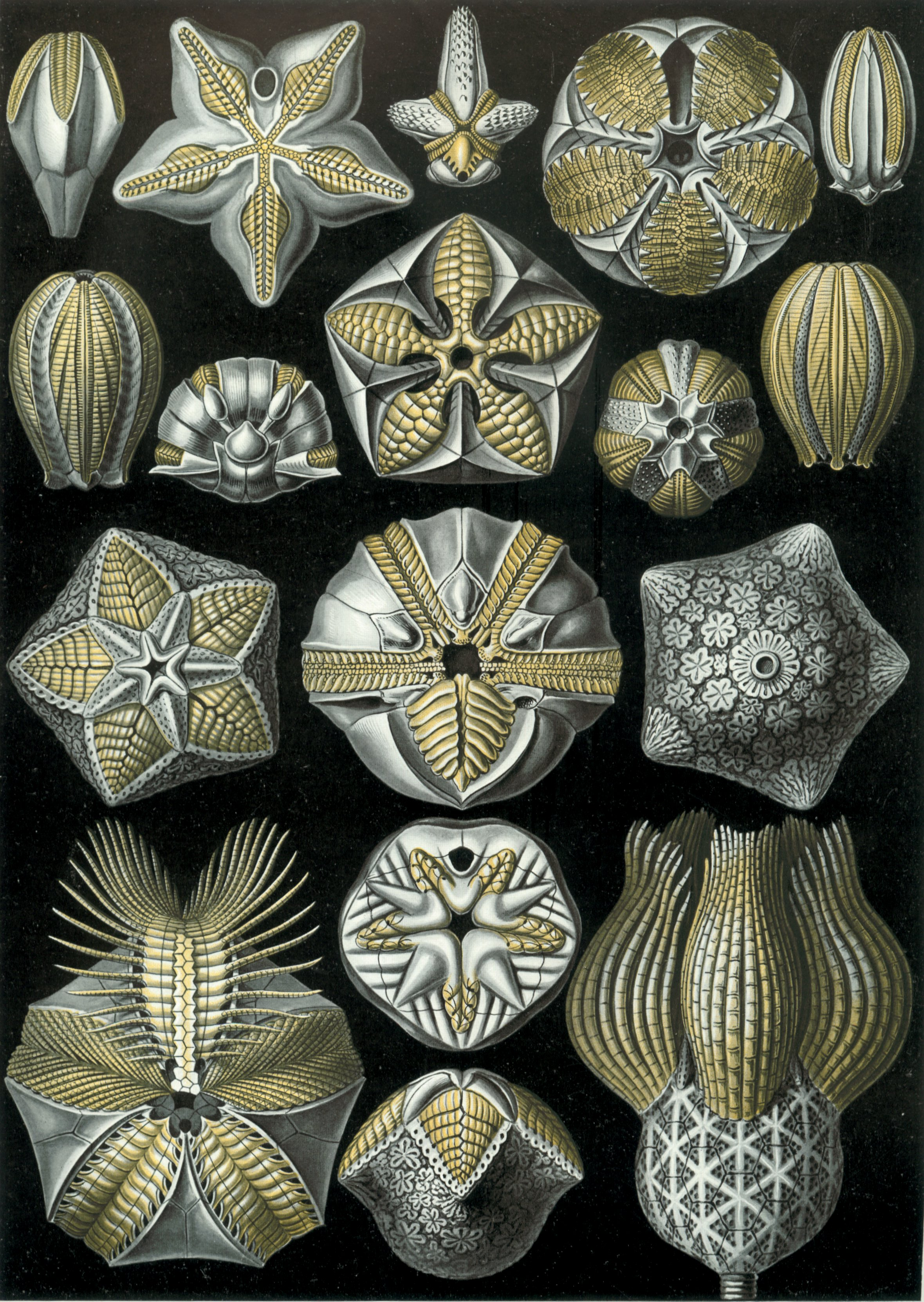
Blastoidea

- Order Coronata †
- Order Fissiculata †
- Order Spiraculata †
- basal Macurdablastus †

=== Class Eocrinoidea † ===
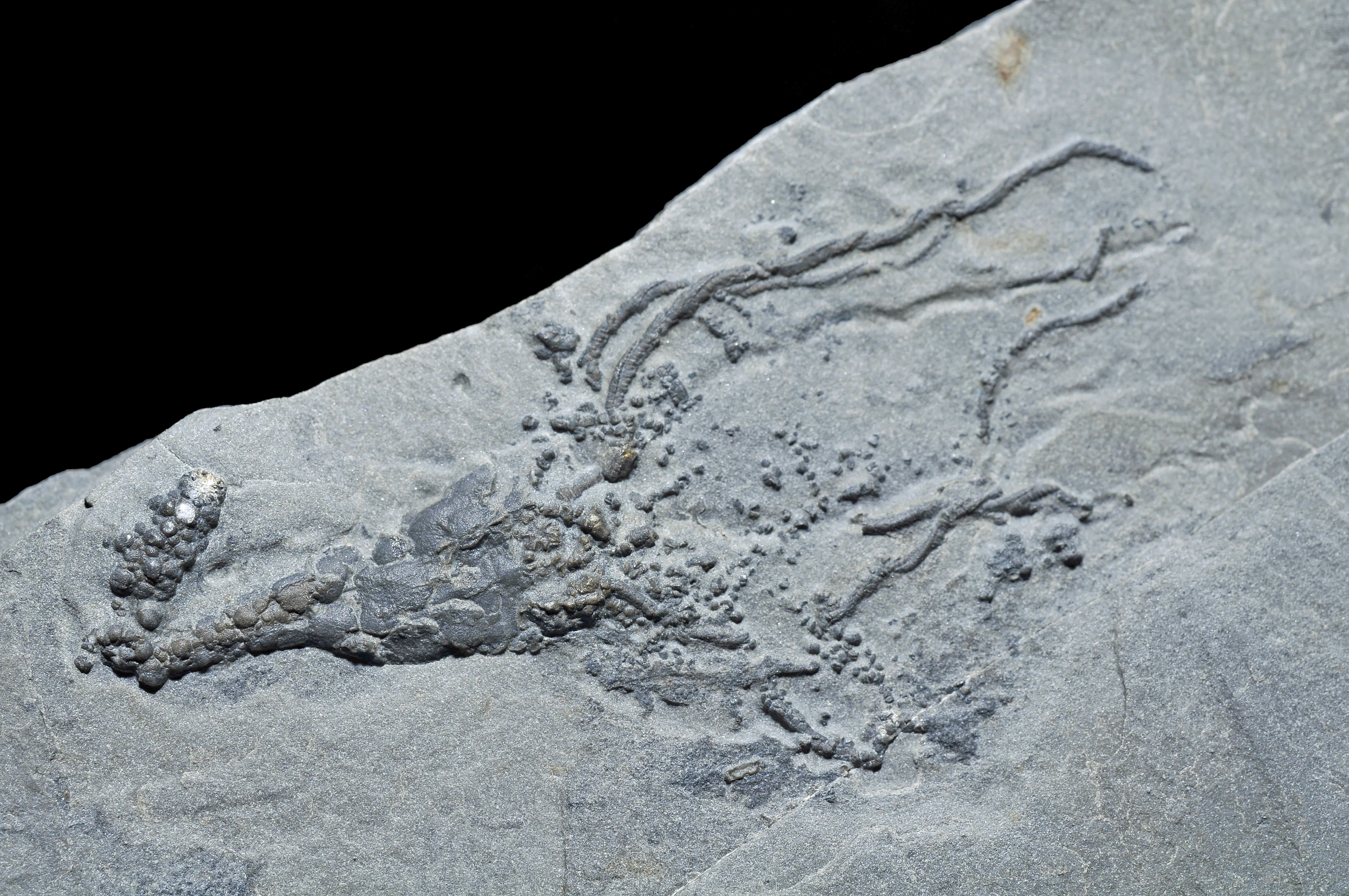
Gogia spiralis (Eocrinoidea)

- Order Ascocystida †
- Order Gogiida †
- Order Imbricata †
- Order Trachelocrinida †

=== Class Paracrinoidea † ===
- order Comarocystitida †
- order Platycystitida †

=== Class Rhombifera † ===
Note that Rhombiferans are often included in the informal group (and former class) Cystoidea†.

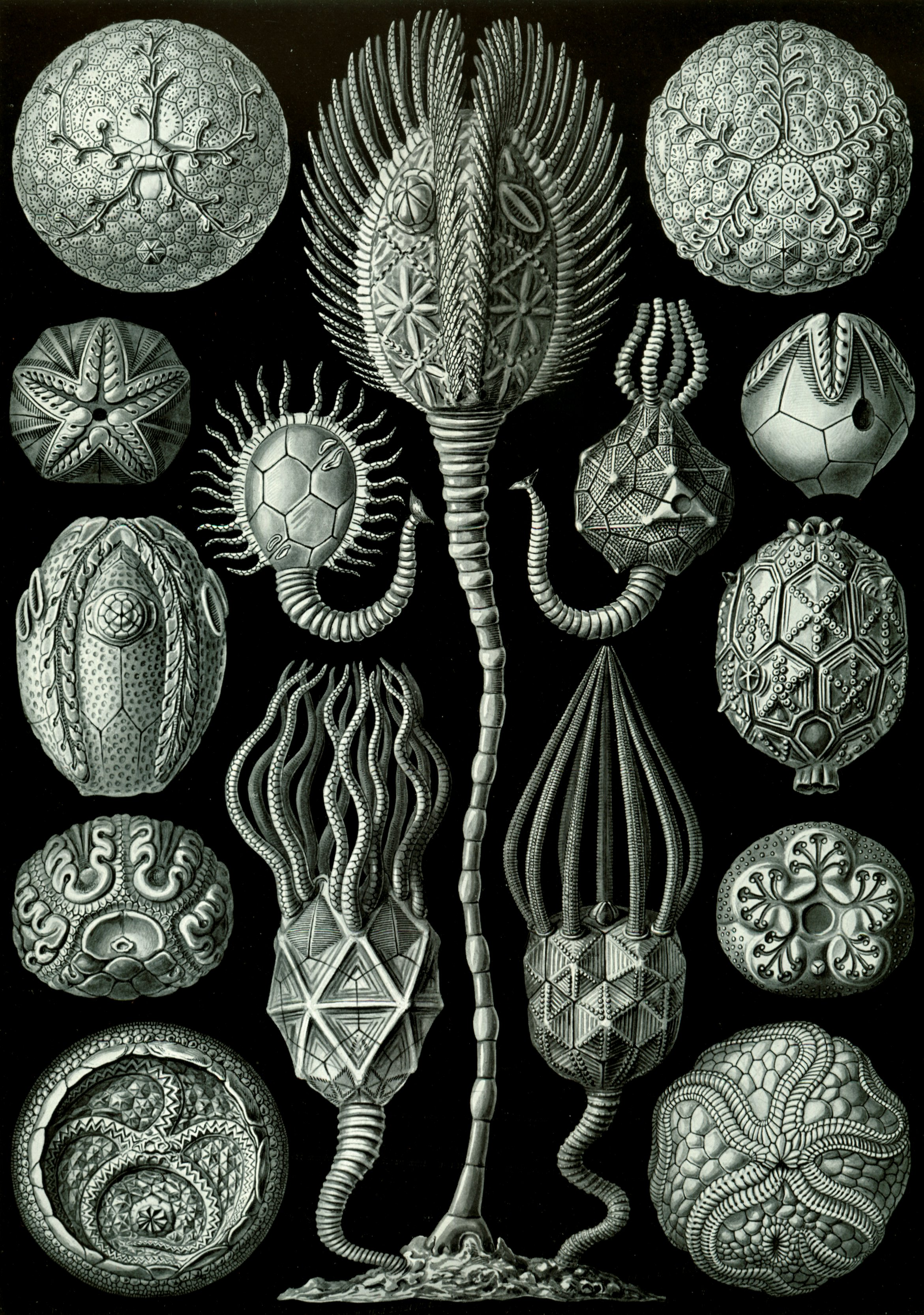
Cystoidea (Rhombifera and Diploporita)

- Order Dichoporita†
- Order Fistuliporita†

=== Class Diploporita † ===
Note that Diploporitans are often included in the informal group (and former class) Cystoidea†.

- order Aristocystitida
- order Asteroblastida
- order Glyptosphaeritida
- order Sphaeronitida

== Subphylum Homalozoa † ==
Corthurnocystis, a Stylophora.

=== Class Ctenocystoidea † ===
- order Ctenocystida †

=== Class Soluta † ===
Sometimes treated as Class Homoiostelea, Order Soluta

=== Class Cincta † ===
Sometimes treated as Class Homostelea, Order Cincta

=== Class Stylophora † ===
- order Cornuta †
- order Mitrata †
