= List of crinoid genera =

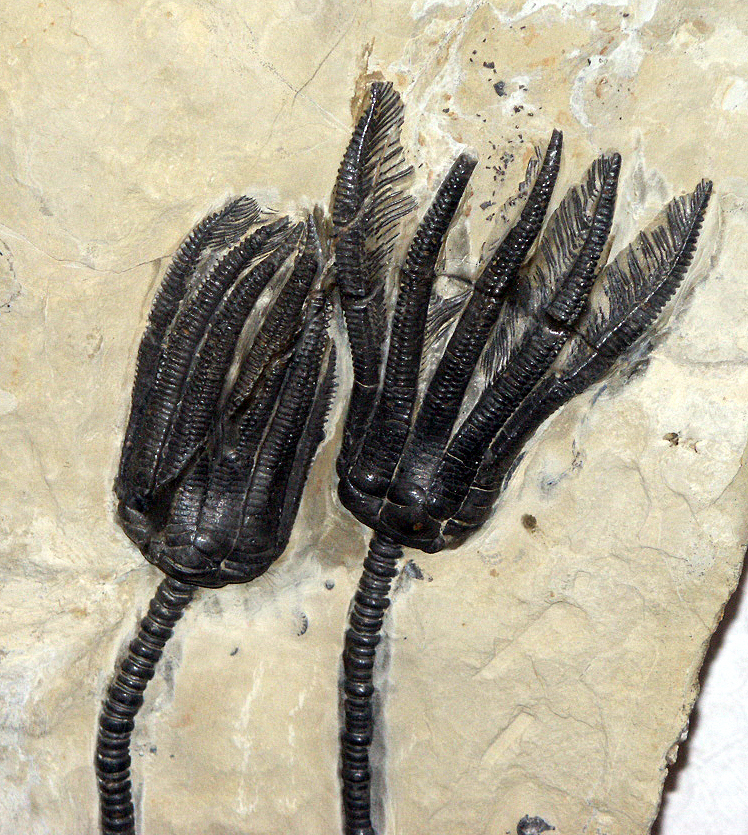
Fossil crinoid

This list of crinoid genera is an attempt to create a comprehensive listing of all genera that have ever been considered to be crinoids, excluding purely vernacular terms. The list includes all commonly accepted genera, but also genera that are now considered invalid, doubtful (nomina dubia), or were not formally published (nomina nuda), as well as junior synonyms of more established names, and genera that are no longer considered crinoids.

== Naming conventions and terminology ==
Naming conventions and terminology follow the International Code of Zoological Nomenclature (ICZN). Technical terms used include:

- Junior synonym: A name which describes the same taxon as a previously published name. If two or more genera are formally designated and the type specimens are later assigned to the same genus, the first to be published (in chronological order) is the senior synonym, and all other instances are junior synonyms. Senior synonyms are generally used, except by special decision of the ICZN, but junior synonyms cannot be used again, even if deprecated. Junior synonymy is often subjective, unless the genera described were both based on the same type specimen.
- Nomen nudum (Latin for "naked name"): A name that has appeared in print but has not yet been formally published by the standards of the ICZN. Nomina nuda (the plural form) are invalid, and are therefore not italicized as a proper generic name would be. If the name is later formally published, that name is no longer a nomen nudum and will be italicized on this list. Often, the formally published name will differ from any nomina nuda that describe the same specimen.
- Nomen oblitum (Latin for "forgotten name"): A name that has not been used in the scientific community for more than fifty years after its original proposal.
- Preoccupied name: A name that is formally published, but which has already been used for another taxon. This second use is invalid (as are all subsequent uses) and the name must be replaced. As preoccupied names are not valid generic names, they will also go unitalicized on this list.
- Nomen dubium (Latin for "dubious name"): A name describing a fossil with no unique diagnostic features. As this can be an extremely subjective and controversial designation, this term is not used on this list.

== Columnals ==
Stukalina proposed a classification of columnals. Most families in this classification are based on a single genus. It may also be that separate families have been erected for different parts of the stem of a single crinoid genus. No families have been added for columnal genera in the initial input of data in the following table. These genera may be identified by the use of "[columnal]" in the family column of the table. It should also be noted that, where the same generic name has been used for columnals and cups/crowns, there is often considerable uncertainty that they actually belong in the same genus. As studies of columnals continue, it is hoped that things will improve and a classification will emerge that is based on the whole animal.

== The list ==
Genus	Authors	Year	Type species	Family	Status	Age	Location	Notes
Aacocrinus	Bowsher	1955	A. nododorsatus Bowsher, 1955	Actinocrinitidae	extinct	Mississippian (Toumaisian), Pennsylvanian (Bashkirian)	United States, Algeria	
Aaglaocrinus (not to be confused with Aglaocrinus Strimple, 1961)	Webster	1981	Ethelocrinus expansus Strimple, 1938	Cromyocrinidae	extinct	Pennsylvanian	United States	
Aatocrinus	Moore & Plummer	1940	Zeacrinus? robustus Beede, 1900	Pirasocrinidae	extinct	Permian (mid Wolfcampian)	United States	
Abacocrinus	Angelin	1878	Actinocrinites tesseracontadactylus Goldfuss, 1831	Abacocrinidae	extinct	Silurian (Llandoverian, Wenlockian)	Sweden, Germany, Canada	
Abactinocrinus (incorrectly spelled Abactinocrinites by Lane, Maples & Waters, 2001)	Laudon & Severson	1953	A. rossei	Actinocrinitidae	extinct	Devonian (Famennian), Mississippian (Tournaisian)	United States, China	
Abathocrinus	Strimple	1963	Mariacrinus? rotundus Springer, 1926	uncertain (Monobathrid)	extinct	Silurian (Niagaran)	United States	
Abatocrinus	Lane	1963	Actinocrinus turbinatus Hall, 1858	Batocrinidae	extinct	Devonian (Frasnian) & Mississippian (Tournaisian-Viséan)	Germany, United States	
Abbreviatocrinites (jun. syn. of Halocrinites)	Bohatý	2005	Cuppressocrinus abbreviatus Goldfuss, 1839					
Abludoglyptocrinus	Kolata	1982	Glyptocrinus charltoni Kolata, 1975	Glyptocrinidae	extinct	Ordovician (Sandian-Katian)	United States, Canada	
Abrachiocrinus	Wanner	1920	Sycocrinites clausus Austin & Austin, 1843	Codiacrinidae	extinct	Mississippian (Tournaisian), Permian	United Kingdom, Timor	
Abracrinus (jun. syn. of Carpocrinus)	d'Orbigny	1849						
Abrotocrinus	Miller & Gurley	1890	A. cymosus Miller & Gurley, 1890	Staphylocrinidae	extinct	Mississippian (Tournaisian, Viséan)	United States, Ireland, Algeria	
Abyssocrinus	Strimple	1963	Synbathocrinus antiquus Strimple, 1952	Ramacrinidae	extinct	Silurian (Niagaran)	United States	
Acacocrinus	Wachsmuth & Springer	1897	A. elrodi Wachsmuth & Springer, 1897	Periechocrinidae	extinct	Silurian (Llandoverian & Niagaran), Devonian (Givetian)	United States	
Acanthocrinus	Roemer	1850	A. longispina Roemer, 1850	Rhodocrinitidae	extinct	Devonian, Mississippian	Europe, North America, North Africa	
Acanthodocrinus	Yeltsychewa	1979	A. rakverensis Yeltyschewa, 1979	[columnal]	extinct	Ordovician (Katian)	Estonia	
Acariaeocrinus Nomina dubia; nom. nov. pro Microcrinus Terquem & Piette, 1865 (not to be confused with Acaraiaiocrinus Wanner, 1924)	Biese	1935	Microcrinus liasinus Terquem & Piette, 1865		extinct	Jurassic (Sinemurian)	France	
Acariaiocrinus	Wanner	1924	A. clavulus Wanner, 1924	Streblocrinidae	extinct	Permian	Timor	
Acbastaucrinus (incorrectly spelled Acbastaurcrinus by Sisova, 1979) (jun. syn. of Floricyclus)	Sisova	1979	A. acbastauensis Sisova, 1979	[columnal]				
Achradocrinus (incorrectly spelled Acradocrinus by Apringer in Zittel, 1913)	Schultze	1866	A. ventrosus Schultze, 1866	Cyathocrinidae	extinct	Devonian (Eifelian)	Germany	
Aclistocrinus	Eckert & Brett	2001	A. capistratus Eckert & Brett, 2001	Eucalyptocrinitidae	extinct	Silurian (Llandoverian)	United States	
Acolocrinus	Kesling & Paul	1971	A. hydraulicus Kesling & Paul, 1971	Acolocrinidae	extinct	Ordovician (Darriwilian, Sandbian)	United States	
Acrochordocrinus (incorrectly spelled as Acrochordorrinus on p113)	Trautschold	1859	A. insignis Trautschold, 1859	Cyclocrinidae	extinct	Jurassic (Bajocian) to Cretaceous (Albian)	France, Germany, Poland, Russia, Switzerland, England	
Acrocrinus	Yandell	1855	A. shumardi Yandell, 1855	Acrocrinidae	extinct	Mississippian (Viséan)	United States, Europe	
Actinocrinites (incorrectly spelled Actinus by Phillips, 1836)	Miller	1821	A. triacontadactylus Miller, 1821	Actinocrinitidae	extinct	Devonian, Mississippian & Permian	Europe, North Africa, Australia, North America, Japan, Timor	
Actinometra (jun. syn. of Comatula) [incorrect spellings include: Aetinometra Carpenter, 1881, 204; Actinomedra von Graff, 1883, 132; Actynometra Filhol, 1885, 213; Actrinometra Hartlaub, 1891, 97; Actinometer Springer, 1903, 220 & Actinomerta Clark, 1912, 91.]	Müller	1841						
Acylocrinus	Kirk	1947	A. tumidus Kirk, 1947	Decadocrinidae	extinct	Mississippian (Tournaisian & Viséan)	United States	
Adacrinus	Pabian & Strimple	1985	Oklahomacrinus loeblichi Moore, 1939	Ampelocrinidae	extinct	Pennsylvanian	United States, Canada	
Adelatelecrinus	Messing	2013	.	Atelecrinidae	extant	Quaternary (Holocene)	Indonesia	
Adelocrinus	Phillips	1841	A. hystrix Phillips, 1841	Hexacrinidae	extinct	Devonian (Famennian)	United Kingdom, Germany	
Adelometra	Clark	1907	Antedon angustiradia Carpenter, 1888	Antedonidae	extant	Quaternary (Holocene)	Indonesia	
Adelphicrinus	Guensburg & Sprinkle	2003	A. fortuitus Guensburg & Sprinkle, 2003	uncertain (Camerata)	extinct	Ordovician (Floian)	United States	
Adiakritocrinus	Webster	1997	A. oviatti Webster, 1997	uncertain (Cladida)	extinct	Mississippian (Tournasian)	United States	
Adinocrinus	Kirk	1938	Zeacrinus nodosus Wachsmuth & Springer, 1885	Adinocrinidae	extinct	Mississippian (Viséan)	United States	
Aenigmocrinus	Strimple	1973	Poteriocrinus anomalus Wetherby, 1880	uncertain (Cladida)	extinct	Mississippian (Viséan-Serpukhovian)	United States	
Aesiocrinus	Miller & Gurley	1890	A. magnificus Miller & Gurley, 1890	Aesiocrinidae	extinct	Mississippian (Serpukhovian) & Pennsylvanian	United States, Russia	
Aethocrinus	Ubaghs	1969	A. moorei Ubaghs, 1969	Aethocrinidae	extinct	Ordovician (Tremadocian-Floian)	France	
Aetocrinus	Ausich & Copper	2010	A. gracilis Ausich and Copper, 2010	Dendrocrinidae	extinct	Silurian (Llandoverian)	Canada	
Aexitrophocrinus	Strimple & Watkins	1969	Synerocrinus formosus Moore & Plummer, 1940	Dactylocrinidae	extinct	Mississippian (Viséan & Serpukhovian) & Pennsylvanian	United States, Russia, United Kingdom	
Affinocrinus	Knapp	1969	A. concavus Knapp, 1969	Pirasocrinidae	extinct	Pennsylvanian (Morrowan & Atokan)	United States	
Agaricocrinus (incorrectly spelled Agaricocrinites by Troost, 1850)	Hall	1858	A. tuberosus Hall, 1858	Coelocrinidae	extinct	Mississippian (Tournaisian & Viséan)	United States	
Agassizocrinus (incorrectly spelled Agassizocrinites by Troost, 1850)	Owen & Shumard	1852	A. conicus Owen & Shumard, 1852	Agassizocrinidae	extinct	Mississippian (Viséan & Serpukhovian)	United States	
Agathocrinus	Schewtschenko	1967	A. globosus Schewtschenko, 1967	Parahexacrinidae	extinct	Devonian	China, Kyrgyzstan	
Aglaocrinus (not to be confused with Aaglaocrinus Webster, 1981)	Strimple	1961	Ethelocrinus magnus Strimple, 1949	Cromyocrinidae	extinct	Pennsylvanian (Morrowan to Virgilian)	United States	
Aglaometra	AH Clark	1913	Antedon valida Carpenter, 1888	Thalassometridae	extant	Quaternary (Holocene)	Indonesia	
Agnostocrinus	Webster & Lane	1967	A. typus Webster & Lane, 1967	Staphylocrinidae	extinct	Permian (Wolfcampian, Wordian)	United States	
Agostocrinus	Kesling & Paul	1971	A. xenus Kesling & Paul, 1971	Agostocrinidae	extinct	Ordovician (Sandbian)	United States	
Agriocrinus (jun. syn. of Hapalocrinus)	Jaekel	1895	A. frenchi Jaekel, 1895					
Aidemocrinus (jun. syn. of Kallimorphocrinus)	Weller	1930	A. odiosus Weller, 1930					
Ailsacrinus	Taylor	1983	A. abbreviatus Taylor, 1983	Millericrinidae	extinct	Jurassic (Bathonian)	England	
Ainacrinus (incorrectly spelled Ainocrinus by Webster, 1993)	Wright	1939	Synerocrinus smithi Wright, 1934	Euryocrinidae	extinct	Mississippian (Viséan)	United Kingdom	
Ainigmacrinus	Hagdorn	1988	Ainigmacrinus calyconodalis Hagdorn, 1988	Ainigmacrinidae	extinct	Triassic (Ladinian to Carnian)	southern Alps	
Aishacrinus	Prokop	2010	A. carus Prokop, 2010	Aishacrinidae	extinct	Silurian (Ludlovian)	Czech Republic	
Aithriocrinus	Donovan & Veltkamp	1993	A. strahani Donovan & Veltkamp, 1993	Uncertain (Cladida)	extinct	Ordovician (Katian)	United Kingdom	
Akiyoshicrinus	Hashimoto	1995	A. isensis Hashimoto, 1995	Erisocrinidae	extinct	Pennsylvanian (Atokan)	Japan	
Alcimocrinus	Kirk	1938	Zeacrinus girtyi Springer, 1926	Zeacrinitidae	extinct	Mississippian (Serpukhovian) & Pennsylvanian (Morrowan-Atokan)	United States	
Alecto (nomen dubium - not identifiable) (incorrectly spelled Alectro by Say, 1825)	Leach	1815	Alecto horrida Leach, 1815	uncertain (Comatulida)	extant	Quaternary (Holocene)	unknown	
Algabascocrinus	Stukalina & Tujutjan	1970	A. obtusus Stukalina & Tujutjan, 1970	[columnal]	extinct	Ordovician (Sandbian)	Kazakhstan	
Alisocrinus	Kirk	1929	Mariacrinus warreni Ringueberg, 1888	Melocrinitidae	extinct	Ordovician (Hirnantian) & Silurian (Ludlovian & Niagaran)	North America	
Alisometra	AH Clark	1947	Colobometra owstoni Clark, 1912	Colobometridae	extant	Quaternary (Holocene)	Western Pacific	
Allagecrinus	Carpenter & Etheridge	1881	A. austinii Carpenter & Etheridge, 1881	Allagecrinidae	extinct	Devonian (Famernnian) to Pennsylvanian (Bashkirian)	North America, United Kingdom	
Allionia [wiki link is to a plant, not the crinoid]	Michelotti	1861	A. oblita Michelotti, 1861	Antedonidae (Heliometrinae)	extinct	Neogene (Miocene)	Italy	
Allocatillocrinus	Wanner	1937	Allagecrinus carpenteri Wachsmuth, 1882	Allagecrinidae	extinct	Mississippian (Viséan-Serpukhovian) & Permian (Artinskian)	United States, Russia, United Kingdom	
Allocrinus	Wachsmuth & Springer	1890	A. typus Wachsmuth & Springer, 1890	Patelliocrinidae	extinct	Silurian	United States	
Alloeocomatella	Messing	1995	A. polycladida Messing, 1995	Comatulidae	extant	Quaternary (Holocene)	Indo-western Pacific	
Alloprosallocrinus	Casseday & Lyon	1862	A. conicus Casseday & Lyon, 1862	Batocrinidae	extinct	Mississippian (Viséan)	United States	
Allosocrinus	Strimple	1949	A. bronaughi Strimple, 1949	Calceolispongiidae	extinct	Pennsylvanian (Desmoinesian-Missourian)	United States	
Allosycocrinus	Wanner	1924	A. pusillus Wanner, 1924	Cycocrinitidae	extinct	Permian	Timor	
Allozygocrinus	Witzke and Strimple	1981	A. dubuquensis Witzke and Strimple, 1981	Dimerocrinitidae	extinct	Silurian (Wenlockian & Llandoverian)	United States, Canada	
Alopocrinus	Ausich and Copper	2010	A. parvus Ausich and Copper 2010	Glyptocrinidae	extinct	Silurian (Llandoverian)	Canada	
Alphacrinus	Guensburg	2010	A. mansfieldi Guensburg 2010	Alphacrinidae	extinct	Ordovician (Tremadocian)	United States	
Alsopocrinus (jun. syn. of Lecanocrinus)	Tansey	1924	A. anna Tansey, 1924					
Altimarginalicrinus	Stukalina	1979	Pentagonocyclicus altimarginalis Yeltyschewa, 1955	[columnal]	extinct	Ordovician & Silurian	Russia, Canada, Poland	
Amabilicrinus	Webster et al.	2003	A. iranensis Webster et al., 2003	Amabilicrinidae	extinct	Mississippian (Tournaisian)	Iran	
Amadeusicrinus	Waters et al.	2003	Pachylocrinus subpentagonalis Lane, Waters & Maples, 1997	Sostronocrinidae	extinct	Devonian (Famennian)	China	
Amaltheocrinus	Klikushin	1984	Apiocrinites amalthei Quenstedt, 1852	Uncertain (originally in Cyclocrinidae)	extinct	Jurassic (Pliensbachian)	Germany	
Amazaricrinus	Kurilenko	2001	A. ildicanensis Kurilenko, 2001	[columnal]	extinct	Devonian (Pragian)	Russia	
Ambicocrinus	Kirk	1945	Thysanocrinus arborescens Talbot, 1905	Dimerocrinitidae	extinct	Silurian-Devonian	United States	
Amblacrinus	d'Orbigny	1849	Platycrinus rosaceus Roemer, 1844	Haplocrinitidae	extinct	Devonian (Eifelian-Givetian)	Europe	
Ambonacrinus	Cole et al.	2017	A. decorus Cole et al., 2017	Rhodocrinitidae	extinct	Ordovician (Katian)	Spain	
Ameliacrinus (jun. syn. of Opsiocrinus)	Kesling	1968	A. benderi Kesling, 1968					
Ammonicrinus	Springer	1926	A. wanneri Springer, 1926	Calycocrinidae	extinct	Devonian & Permian	Europe, north Africa, Russia	
Amonohexacrinus	Schewtschenko	1967	A. adelius Schewtschenko, 1967	Parahexacrinidae	extinct	Devonian	Tajikistan	
Ampelocrinus	Kirk	1942	Poteriocrinus kaskaskiensis Worthen, 1882	Ampelocrinidae	extinct	Mississippian (Viséan & Serpukhovian) & Pennsylvanian (Morrowan)	United States, United Kingdom	
Ampheristocrinus	Hall	1879	A. typus Hall, 1879	Euspirocrinidae	extinct	Silurian (Niagaran)	United States	
Amphicrinus	Springer	1906	A. scotius Springer, 1914	Euryocrinidae	extinct	Mississippian & Pennsylvanian	United States, Russia, United Kingdom	
Amphimetra	AH Clark	1909	Comatula (Alecto) milberti Müller, 1846 [jun. syn. of Amphimetra tessellata (Müller, 1841)]	Himerometridae	extant	Quaternary (Holocene)	Sri Lanka, through Indonesia, to Japan	
Amphipsalidocrinus	Weller	1930	A. scissurus Weller, 1930	Platycrinitidae	extinct	Permian (Artinskian) through Devonian (Givetian)	United States, Russia, Ireland, Iran	
Ampholenium	Moore & Jeffords	1968	A. apolegma Moore & Jeffords, 1968	[columnal]	extinct	Mississippian (Tournaisian & Viséan)	Poland, United States	
Amphoracrinus (incorrectly spelled Amphoricrinus by Zittel, 1880)	Austin	1848	Actinocrinus gilbertsoni Miller, 1836	Amphoracrinidae	extinct	Mississippian (Tournaisian & Viséan)	United States, Europe, China, Morocco	
Amphoracrocrinus	Moore & Strimple	1969	Acrocrinus amphora Wachsmuth and Springer, 1897	Acrocrinidae	extinct	Mississippian (Viséan & Serpukhovian)	United States	
Amphorometra	Gislén	1924	Glenotremites conoideus Goldfuss, 1840	Conometridae	extinct	Cretaceous (Cenomanian) to Paleogene (Danian)	Czech Republic, Denmark, England, Germany, Netherlands & Tunisia	
Ampullacrinus	Webster et al.	2004	A. marieae Webster et al., 2004	Scytalocrinidae	extinct	Mississippian (Serpukhovian)	Algeria	
Amsdenanteris	Moore & Jeffords	1968	A. tennesseensis Moore & Jeffords, 1968	[columnal]	extinct	Silurian (Niagaran)	United States	
Amurocrinus	Dubatolova	1971	Pentagonocyclicus imatschensis Yeltyschewa & Dubatolova, 1971	[columnal]	extinct	Devonian (Emsian, Eifelian & Frasnian)	Russia, Germany, France, Poland	
Anachalypsicrinus	A.M. Clark	1973	A. nefertiti A.M. Clark, 1973	Hyocrinidae	extant	Quaternary (Holocene)	north Atlantic	
Anaglyptocrinus	Webster & Jell	1999	A. willinki Webster & Jell, 1999	Euspirocrinidae	extinct	Permian (Artinskian)	Australia	
Analcidometra	A.H. Clark	1918	Antedon armata Pourtalès, 1869	Colobometridae	extant	Quaternary (Holocene)	Caribbean	
Anamesocrinus	Goldring	1923	A. lutheri Goldring, 1923	Anamesocrinidae	extinct	Devonian (Givetian & Famennian)	United States, China	
Anarchocrinus	Jaekel	1918	A. rossicus Jaekel, 1918	Cyathocrinidae	extinct	Ordovician (Sandbian-Katian)	Estonia	
Anartiocrinus	Kirk	1940	A. lyoni Kirk, 1940	Agassizocrinidae	extinct	Mississippian (Viséan & Serpukhovian)	United States	
Ancalocrinus	Webster & Lane	1987	Actinocrinus spinobrachiatus Hall, 1859	Amphoracrinidae	extinct	Mississippian (Viséan)	United States	
Ancepsicrinus	Salamon & Gorzelak	2010	Ancepsicrinus parvus Salamon & Gorzelak, 2010	Uncertain	extinct	Jurassic (Tithonian)	Poland	
Anchicrinus	Strimple & Watkins	1969	A. toddi Strimple & Watkins, 1969	Laudonocrinidae	extinct	Pennsylvanian	North America	
Ancistrocrinus	Wanner	1924	A. vermistriatus Wanner, 1924	Prophyllocrinidae	extinct	Permian	Timor	
Ancoracrinus	Webster & Lane	1987	A. typus Webster & Lane, 1987	Euryocrinidae	extinct	Mississippian (Viséan)	United States	
Ancyrocrinus (incorrectly spelled Ancynocrinus by Cieszkowski, 1979)	Hall	1862	A. bulbosus Hall, 1862	Gasterocomidae	extinct	Devonian (Pragian, Givetian & Eifelian)	Canada, France	
Anderkenicrinus	Stukalina	1985	A. antiquus Stukalina, 1985	[columnal]	extinct	Ordovician (Sandbian)	Kazakhstan	
Andrometra	AH Clark	1917	Antedon psyche AH Clark, 1908	Antedonidae	extant	Quaternary (Holocene)	Andaman Islands to Japan	
Anechocrinus	Webster	1990	A. nalbiaensis Webster, 1990	Stellarocrinidae	extinct	Permian (Artinskian)	Australia	
Anemetocrinus (incorrectly spelled Anematocrinus by Lane & Sevastopulo, 1990)	Wright	1938	A. biserialis Wright, 1938	Scytalocrinidae	extinct	Mississippian (Viséan)	United Kingdom	
Angelinocrinus (jun. syn. of Briarocrinus)	Jaekel	1918	Briarocrinus angustus Angelin, 1878					
Angulocrinus	Rollier	1911	Millericrinus nodotianus d'Orbigny, 1841	Millericrinidae	extinct	Jurassic (Callovian to Kimmeridgian)	France, Germany, Portugal, Switzerland, Crimea	
Angusticrinus	Stukalina	1980	A. excisus Stukalina, 1980	[columnal]	extinct	Ordovician (Darriwilian)	Kazakhstan	
Anisocrinus	Angelin	1878	A. interradiatus Angelin, 1878	Homalocrinidae	extinct	Ordovician (Hirnantian) & Silurian (Wenlockian & Ludlovian)	United States, Canada, Sweden	
Anisometra	John	1939	A. frigida John, 1939	Antedonidae	extant	Quaternary (Holocene)	Antarctic	
Annacrinus (jun syn of Endoxocrinus)	AH Clark	1923a	Pentacrinus wyvillethomsoni Thomson, 1872					
Annametra	A.H. Clark	1936	Cominia occindentalis AH Clark, 1915	Antedonidae	extant	Quaternary (Holocene)	South Africa, Japan	
Anneissia	Summers, Messing & Rouse	2014	Alecto bennetti Müller, 1841	Comatulidae	extant	Quaternary (Holocene)	western Pacific	
Annulocolumnus	Donovan	1989	A. annulus Donovan, 1989	[columnal]	extinct	Ordovician (Dapingian, Sandbian & Katian)	United Kingdom	
Anobasicrinus	Strimple	1961	A. bulbosus Strimple, 1961	Anobasicrinidae	extinct	Pennsylvanian	United States	
Anomalocrinus (incorrectly spelled Anamalocrinus by Ausichm, 1988)	Meek & Worthen	1865	Heterocrinus (A.) incurvus Meek & Worthen, 1865	Anomalocrinidae	extinct	Ordovician (Sandbian & Katian)	United States	
Anthinocrinus	Yeltyschewa & Sisova (in Stukalina)	1961	A. ludlowicus Stukalina, 1961	[columnal]	extinct	Silurian, Devonian & Mississippian	Russia, Estonia, Poland	
Antedon	de Fréminville	1811	A. gorgonia de Fréminville, 1811 [jun. syn. of A. bifida bifida (Pennant, 1777)]	Antedonidae	extant	Quaternary (Holocene)	worldwide	
Anthemocrinus	Wachsmuth and Springer	1881	Eucrinus venustus Angelin, 1878	Anthemocrinidae	extinct	Silurian (Wenlockian)	Sweden	
Anthometra - junior homonym of Anthometra Boisduval, 1840 (Lepidoptera) - see Anthometrina [link removed as it takes you to the lepidopteran.]	Clark	1915	.	.	.	.	.	
Anthometrina	Eléaume, Hess & Messing, 2011	2011	Antedon adriani Bell, 1908	Antedonidae	extant	Quaternary (Holocene)	Antarctica	
Anthocrinus (jun. syn. of Crotalocrinites)	Müller	1853	A. loveni Müller, 1853					
Anthracocrinus	Strimple and Watkins	1955	A. primitivus Strimple and Watkins, 1955	Anthracocrinidae	extinct	Ordovician (Sandbian)	United States	
Antihomocrinus	Schmidt	1934	Homocrinus tenuis Bather, 1893	Mastigocrinidae	extinct	Silurian & Devonian	Europe, Australia	
Anulocrinus	Ramsbottom	1961	A. thraivensis Ramsbottom, 1961	Calceocrinidae	extinct	Ordovician (Sandbian-Katian) & Silurian (Niagaran)	United States, United Kingdom	
Aonodiscus	LeMenn (in Chaulvel & LeMenn)	1972	A. spinosus Le Menn	[columnal]	extinct	Ordovician (Katian)	France, Italy	
Aorocrinus	Wachsmuth and Springer	1897	Dorycrinus immaturus Wachsmuth and Springer, 1889	Coelocrinidae	extinct	Devonian (Givetian) & Mississippian (Tournaisian & Viséan)	North America	
Apertocrinus	Stukalina	1968	A. apertus Yeltyschewa & Stukalina in Stukalina, 1968	[columnal]	extinct	Ordovician (Darriwilian)	Kazakhstan	
Aphanocomaster	Messing	1995	Comaster pulcher AH Clark, 1912	Comatulidae	extant	Quaternary (Holocene)	Kei Islands (Indonesia)	
Apektocrinus	Guensburg and Sprinkle	2009	A. ubaghsi Guensburg and Sprinkle, 2009	Apektocrinidae	extinct	Ordovician (Tremadocian)	United States	
Aphelecrinus	Kirk	1944	A. elegans Kirk, 1944	Aphelecrinidae	extinct	Devonian (Famennian) & Mississippian	United States, United Kingdom	
Apiastrum	Moore & Jeffords	1968	A. candidum Moore & Jeffords, 1968	[columnal]	extinct	Ordovician (Katian) & Devonian (Lochkovian)	United States, Russia	
Apiocrinites (= Apiocrinus Agassiz, 1836: 195 nomen vanum)	Miller	1821	Encrinites parkinsoni v. Schlotheim, 1820 (=A. rotundus Miller, 1821)	Apiocrinitidae	extinct	Lower Jurassic to Lower Cretaceous	Europe, Algeria, Mexico	
Apiocrinites (jun. syn. of Enallocrinus) [The wiki link refers to Apiocrinites Miller, not Apiocrinites Hisinger]	Hisinger (non Miller)	1828	Apiocrinites scriptus Hisinger, 1828					
Apiocrinus (emend. pro Apiocrinites Miller, 1821)	Agassiz	1836						
Apletoanteris	Webster & Delattre	1993	A. bajaensis Webster & Delattre, 1993	[columnal]	extinct	Permian (Leonardian)	Mexico	
Apoarchaeocrinus	Ausich and Copper	2010	A. anticostiensis Ausich and Copper, 2010	Rhodocrinitidae	extinct	Silurian (Llandoverian)	Canada	
Apodasmocrinus	Warn and Strimple	1977	A. daubei Warn and Strimple, 1977	Homocrinidae	extinct	Ordovician (Darriwilian & Sandbian)	United States	
Apographiocrinus (incorrectly spelled Apiographiocrinus by Webster & Jell, 1993)	Moore and Plummer	1940	A. typicalis Moore and Plummer, 1940	Apographiocrinidae	extinct	Mississippian, Pennsylvanian & Permian	United States, United Kingdom, Australia, Thailand, Timor, Greece	
Apokryphocrinus	Webster	1997	A. wellsvillensis Webster, 1997	Aphelecrinidae	extinct	Mississippian (Tournaisian)	United States	
Apollocrinus (jun. syn. of Stellarocrinus)	Moore & Plummer	1940	A. geometricus Moore & Plummer, 1940					
Aporometra	H.L. Clark	1938	Himerometra paedophora HL Clark, 1909	Aporometridae	extant	Quaternary (Holocene)	Australia	
Aporretocrinus (incorrectly spelled Apporretocrinus by Stukalina, 1986)	Dubatolova	1971	Entrochus ligatus Quenstedt, 1876	[columnal]	extinct	Devonian	Russia, Germany	
Appalachiacrinus (jun. syn. of Laudonocrinus)	Burke	1974	A. erwini Burke, 1974					
Applinocrinus	Peck	1973	Saccocoma cretacea Bather, 1924	Saccocomidae	extinct	Cretaceous (Campanian - Maastrichtian)	USA, India, Belgium, England, Germany, Jamaica, Mexico, Netherlands	
Apsidocrinus (not to be confused with Aspidocrinus Hall, 1858)	Jaekel	1907	Apsidocrinus remesi Jaekel, 1907	Phyllocrinidae	extinct	Jurassic (Kimmeridgian) to Cretaceous (Valanginian)	Czeck Republic, Hungary, Italy, Turkey, Poland	
Apurocrinus	McIntosh	1981	A. sucrei McIntosh, 1981	Dimerocrinitidae	extinct	Devonian	Bolivia	
Arachnocrinus	Meek & Worthen	1866	Cyathocrinus bulbosus Hall, 1862	Crotalocrinitidae	extinct	Devonian (Eifelian & Emsian)	United States	
Araeocrinus	Strimple & Watkins	1969	A. bassus Strimple & Watkins, 1969	Ampelocrinidae	extinct	Pennsylvanian (Atokan)	United States	
Aragonocrinus	LeMenn	1988	A. molinoensis Le Menn, 1988	[columnal]	extinct	Devonian (Emsian)	Spain	
Araxicrinus	Stukalina	1999	A. papillaris Stukalina, 1999	[columnal]	extinct	Permian	Russia, Poland, China	
Archaeocalyptocrinus	Witzke & Strimple	1981	A. nodosus Witzke & Strimple, 1981	Eucalyptocrinitidae	extinct	Silurian (Wenlockian & Niagaran)	United States	
Archaeocrinus	Wachsmuth and Springer	1881	Glyptocrinus lacunosus Billings, 1857	Archaeocrinidae	extinct	Ordovician (Darriwilian, Sandbian & Katian)	North America	
Archaeoisocrinus	Webster & Jell	1999	A. occiduaustralis Webster & Jell, 1999	Isocrinidae	extinct	Permian (Artinskian)	Australia	
Archaeometra	Gislén	1924	Solanocrinus asper Quenstedt, 1858	Solanocrinitidae	extinct	Jurassic (Bajocian) to Cretaceous (Valanginian)	Czeck Republic, England, France, Germany, Switzerland	
Archaetaxocrinus	Lewis	1981	A. burfordi Lewis, 1981	Colpodecrinidae	extinct	Ordovician (Darriwilian & Dapingian)	United States	
Arenariocrinus	Yeltyschewa & Sisova (in Dubatolova & Yeltyschewa)	1961	Cyclocylicus arenarius Yeltyschewa & Schewtschenko, 1960	[columnal]	extinct	Devonian, Mississippian & Permian	Russia, China	
Argoviacrinus	Hess & Spichiger	2001	Argoviacrinus rarissimus Hess & Spichiger, 2001	Thiolliericrinidae	extinct	Jurassic (Oxfordian)	Switzerland	
Argyrometra	A.H. Clark	1917	Iridometra crispa AH Clark, 1908	Antedonidae	extant	Quaternary (Holocene)	Hawaii to New Zealand	
Aristocrinus (jun. syn. of Dactylocrinus)	Rowley	1895	Taxocrinus concavus Rowley, 1893					
Arkacrinus	Knapp	1969	Delocrinus dubius Mather, 1915	Phanocrinidae	extinct	Pennsylvanian (Morrowan)	United States	
Armenocrinus	Stimple & Horowitz	1971	A. watersi Stimple & Horowitz, 1971	uncertain (related to Blothrocrinidae)	extinct	Mississippian (Viséan & Serpukhovian)	United States	
Arrectocrinus	Knapp	1969	Delocrinus abruptus Moore & Plummer, 1940	Catacrinidae	extinct	Pennsylvanian (Virgilian & Missourian) & Permian (Wolfcampian)	United States	
Arroyocrinus	Lane & Webster	1966	A. popenoei Lane & Webster, 1966	uncertain (related to Blothrocrinidae)	extinct	Permian	United States	
Artaocrinus	Ausich & Kammer	2009	Platycrinus pendens Springer, 1926	Platycrinitidae	extinct	Mississippian (Tournaisian)	United States	
Arthroacantha (incorrectly spelled Arthracantha by Hinde, 1886)	Williams	1883	A. ithacensis Williams, 1883	Hexacrinidae	extinct	Devonian	United States	
Artichthyocrinus	Wright	1923	A. springeri Wright, 1923	Euryocrinidae	extinct	Mississippian (Viséan) & early Permian	United Kingdom, Greece	
Articuloramus	Donovan	1995	A. montgomeryensis Donovan, 1995	[columnal]	extinct	Ordovician (Dapingian, Sandbian & Katian)	United Kingdom	
Artificiosocrinus	Stukalina & Yeltyschewa	1982	Pentagonopentagonalis artificiosus Yeltyschewa, 1964	[columnal]	extinct	Ordovician (Dapingian & Darriwilian)	Estonia	
Aryballocrinus	Breimer	1962	Actinocrinus (Megistocrinus) whitei Hall, 1861	Periechocrinidae	extinct	Mississippian (Tournaisian, Viséan)	United States, Europe	
Arzocrinus	Hess	2006	Arzocrinus lenticularis Hess, 2006	Tetracrinidae	extinct	Jurassic (Pliensbachian)	Switzerland	
Asaccocrinus (jun. syn. of Delocrinus)	Wanner	1949	Delocrinus malaianus Wanner, 1916					
Asaphocrinus	Springer	1920	A. bassleri Springer, 1920	Homalocrinidae	extinct	Silurian (Wenlockian, Ludlovian)	North America	
Ascarum	de Gregorio	1930	Pentagonopentagonalis artificiosus Yeltyschewa, 1964	[columnal]	extinct	Ordovician (Dapingian & Darriwilian)	Estonia	
Ascetocrinus	Kirk	1940	Scaphiocrinus rusticellus White, 1863	Cercidocrinidae	extinct	Mississippian (Viséan)	United States	
Ascidicrinus	Hess, Salamon & Gorzelak	2011	Ascidicrinus armatus Hess, Salamon & Gorzelak, 2011	Sclerocrinidae	extinct	Jurassic (Tithonian)	Poland	
Ascocrinus	Jaekel (non Barrande, 1887 [Eocrinoidea] =Ascocystites Barrande, 1887)	1918	A. bohemicus Jaekel, 1918	uncertain (?Homocrinidae?)	extinct	Devonian (Givetian)	Czech Republic	
Asperocrinus	Stukalina	1975	A. giganteus Stukalina, 1975	[columnal]	extinct	Devonian	Europe & Russia	
Aspidocrinus	Hall	1858	A. scutelliformis Hall, 1859	[columnal]	extinct	Devonian (Lochkovian & Emsian)	United States	
Astakocrinus	Ausich & Copper	2010	A. teren Ausich & Copper, 2010	Stelidiocrinidae	extinct	Ordovician (Hirnanatian)	Canada	
Asteriacites (ophiurid ichnogenus)	von Schlotheim	1820						
Asteriatites (Unavailable under Art 20 of ICZN code)	von Schlotheim	1813						
Asterocrinus (jun. syn. of Haplocrinites) (incorrectly spelled Asterocrinites by Roemer, 1851)	Münster	1838	A. murchisoni Münster 1838					
Asterocrinus (jun. hom of Asterocrinus Münster - see Pterotocrinus)	Lyon	1857	A. capitalis Lyon, 1857					
Asterometra	A.H. Clark	1907	Antedon macropoda A.H. Clark, 1907	Asterometridae	extant	Quaternary (Holocene)	western Pacific	
Asteromischus	Moore & Jeffords	1968	A. stellatus Moore & Jeffords, 1968	[columnal]	extinct	Mississippian (Viséan)	United States	
Astracrinites (probably correct spelling of Astrocrinites)	Austin & Austin	1843	A. tetragonus Austin, 1843	Astracrinitidae				
Astrocrinites (jun. syn. of Ctenocrinus) (incorrectly spelled Astrocrinus by Bather, 1900)	Conrad	1841	A. pachydactylus Conrad, 1841					
Astrocrinites (probably a typo for Astracrinites)	Austin & Austin	1843	A. tetragonus Austin, 1843	Astracrinitidae	extinct	? Mississippian	United Kingdom	
Astropoda emend. pro Astropodium (unavailable name)								
Astropodium (convoluted history, but unavailable in all uses)	Lhwyd	1699						
Astroporites	LAmbe	1896	A. ottawaensis Lambe, 1896	[columnal]	extinct	Ordovician (Katian)	North America	
Astylocrinus (jun. syn. of Agassizocrinus)	Roemer	1852–54	A. laevis Roemer, 1855					
Asuturaecrinus	Yakovlev	1956	A. dorofeievi Yakovlev, 1956	uncertain (Flexibilia)	extinct	Permian (Artinskian)	Russia	
Asymmetrocrinus	Wanner	1937	A. poteriocrinoides Wanner, 1937	Codiacrinidae	extinct	Permian	Timor	
Atactocrinus	Weller	1916	A. wilmingtonensis Weller, 1916	Rhodocrinitidae	extinct	Ordovician (Katian)	United States	
Atalocrinus	Eckert & Brett	2001	A. arctus Eckert & Brett, 2001	uncertain (Monobathrida)	extinct	Silurian (Llandoverian)	United States	
Ataxiacrinus (jun. syn. of Anomalocrinus) (incorrectly spelled Ataxocrinus by Miller, 1889)	Lyon	1869	A. caponiformis Lyon, 1869					
Ataxiacrinus (jun. hom. of Ataxiacrinus Lyon, 1869 - see Tarachiocrinus)	Strimple	1961	A. multiramus Strimple, 1961					
Atelecrinus	Carpenter	1881	A. balanoides Carpenter, 1881	Atelecrinidae	extant	Quaternary (Holocene)	Gulf of Mexico & NE Atlantic off Ireland	
Atelestocrinus (incorrectly spelled Atelestrocrinus by Bassler & Moodey, 1943 & Attelesocrinus by Wachsmuth & Springer, 1886 [p147])	Wachsmuth & Springer	1886	A. delicatus Wachsmuth & Springer, 1886	Mastigocrinidae	extinct	Devonian (Givetian) & Mississippian (Viséan)	North America & Ireland	
Athabascacrinus (incorrectly spelled Athabascocrinus by Waters et al., 2003)	Laudon, Parks, and Spreng	1952	A. colemanensis Laudon, Parks, and Spreng, 1952	Periechocrinidae	extinct	Devonian (Famennian) & Mississippian (Tournaisian)	China & Canada	
Athenacrinus	Guensburg et al.	2020	A. broweri Guensburg et al., 2020	Athenacrinidae	extinct	Ordovician (Tremadocian)	United States	
Athlocrinus	Moore & Plummer	1940	A. placidus Moore & Plummer, 1940	Laudonocrinidae	extinct	Pennsylvanian (Morrowan to Missourian)	United States	
Athrypsometra	Messing & White	2001	.	Antedonidae	extant	Quaternary (Holocene)	western Pacific & Indian Ocean	
Atocrinus (jun. syn. of Platycrinites)	M'Coy	1844	A. milleri Goldfuss, 1839					
Atokacrinus	Knapp	1969	A. obscurus Knapp, 1969	Paradelocrinidae	extinct	Pennsylvanian	United States, Spain	
Atopocrinus	A.H. Clark	1912	A. sibogae A.H. Clark, 1912	Atopocrinidae	extant	Quaternary (Holocene)	Indonesia & Japan	
Atopocrinus (jun. syn. of Othneiocrinus)	Lane	1970	A. priscus Lane, 1970					
Atractocrinus (jun. syn. of Atelestocrinus)	Kirk	1948	A. concinnus Kirk, 1948					
Atrapocrinus	Strimple	1975	A. mutatus Strimple, 1975	Scytalocrinidae	extinct	Pennsylvanian (Atokan)	United States	
Atremacrinus	Wanner	1929	A. calyculus Wanner, 1929	Streblocrinidae	extinct	Permian	Timor	
Atuatucametra	Jagt	1999	Atuatucametra annae Jagt, 1999	Pterocomidae	extinct	Paleogene (Danian)	Belgium	
Atyphocrinus (jun. syn. of Dystactocrinus)	Ulrich	1925	Heterocrinus (A.) corryvillensis Ulrich, 1925					
Auliskocrinus	Broadhead	1981	Dichocrinus crassitestus White, 1862	Dichocrinidae	extinct	Permian & Mississippian (Viséan)	United States, Australia	
Aulnocrinus	LeMenn	1970	A. renaudae LeMenn, 1970	Proctothylacocrinidae	extinct	Devonian (Pragian)	France	
Aulocrinus	Wachsmuth & Springer	1897	Scaphiocrinus bellus Miller & Gurley, 1890	Decadocrinidae	extinct	Mississippian (Viséan)	United States	
Aulodesocrinus	Wright	1942	A. parvus Wright, 1942	uncertain (Cladida)	extinct	Mississippian (Viséan)	United Kingdom	
Aureocrinus	Prokop	1982	A. snajdri Prokop, 1982	uncertain (Disparida)	extinct	Devonian (Pragian)	Czech Republic	
Austinocrinus	de Loriol	1889	Austinocrinus komaroffi Loriel, 1889	Isselicrinidae	extinct	Cretaceous (Campian - Maastrichtian)	Europe, Central Asia	
Austrometra	A.H. Clark	1916	Oligometra thetidis H.L. Clark, 1909	Colobometridae	extant	Quaternary (Holocene)	Australia	
Aviadocrinus (jun. syn. of Halocrinites)	Almela & Revilla	1950	A. sampelayoi Almela & Revilla, 1950					
Avicantus	Moore & Jeffords	1968	A. dunbari Moore & Jeffords, 1968	[columnal]	extinct	Devonian (Lochkovian)	United States	
Axicrinus	Kristan-Tollman	1977	A. alexandri Kristan-Tollman, 1977	Axicrinidae	extinct	Triassic (Carnian)	southern Alps	
Azygocrinus	Lane	1963	Acrinocrinus dodecadactylus Meek & Worthen, 1861	Batocrinidae	extinct	Mississippian (Tournaisian & Viséan)	United States	
Babanicrinus	Stukalina	1969	B. tuberosus Stukalina, 1969	[columnal]	extinct	Ordovician (Darriwilian, Sandbian & Katian)	Baltic region & Kazakhstan	
Babiacrinites	Hauser	2007	B. pyramilis Hauser, 2007	Periechocrinidae	extinct	Devonian (Esmian-Eifelian)	Spain	
Bactrocrinites	Schnur in Steininger	1849	Poteriocrinus fusiformis Roemer, 1844	Thalamocrinidae	extinct	Silurian (Niagaran) & Devonian	United States, India, France	
Bactrocrinus (jun. syn. of Bactroctinites)	Quenstedt	1875	.					
Baerocrinus	Volborth	1864	B. ungerni Volborth, 1864	Baerocrinidae	extinct	Ordovician (Darriwilian)	Russia, Estonia	
Baficrinus	Prokop & Nohejlová	2015	B. vigilis Prokop & Nohejlová, 2015	Zophocrinidae	extinct	Devonian (Emsian)	Czech Republic	
Bakanasocrinus	Stukalina & Tujutjan	1970	B. clavatus Stukalina in Stukalina & Tujutjan, 1970	[columnal]	extinct	Ordovician (Katian)	Kazakhstan	
Balacrinus	Ramsbottom	1961	Glyptocrinus basalis M'Coy, 1850	Archaeocrinidae	extinct	Ordovician (Sandbian-Katian)	United Kingdom	
Balanocrinites (jun. syn. of Lampterocrinus) (incorrectly spelled Balanocrinus by Hall, 1861)	Troost	1850	B. sculptus Troost, 1850					
Balanocrinus	Agassiz (in Desor)	1845	Pentacrinus subteres Münster, 1841	Isocrinidae	extinct	Triassic (Anisian) through Quaternary (Miocene)	Europe, Russia, China, Africa	
Balanometra	Clark	1909	Antedon balanoides Carpenter, 1888	Antedonidae	extant	Quaternary (Holocene)	Philippines	
Balearocrinus	Bourrouilh & Termier	1973	B. breimeri Bourrouilh & Termier, 1973	Poteriocrinitidae	extinct	Mississippian (Viséan)	Spain & Algeria	
Baltocrinus	Stukalina	1979	Cyclopentagonalis balticus Yeltyschewa, 1964	[columnal]	extinct	Ordovician (Darriwilian & Sandbian)	Baltic region & Kazakhstan	
Bangtoupocrinus	Stiller	2000	B. kokeni Stiller, 2000	Bangtoupcrinidae	extinct	Triassic (Anisian)	China	
Barrandeocrinus	Angelin	1878	B. spectrum Angelin, 1878	Carpocrinidae	extinct	Silurian (Wenlockian)	Sweden	
Barycrinus	Wachsmuth (in Meek & Worthern)	1868	Cyathocrinus spurius Hall, 1858	Barycrinidae	extinct	Mississippian (Tournaisian & Viséan)	United States, United Kingdom	
Baryschyr	Moore & Jeffords	1968	Cyclopentagonalis balticus Yeltyschewa, 1964	[columnal]	extinct	Pennsylvanian (Atokan) & Permian (Sakmarian & Artinskian)	United States, Australia	
Basilometra	Clark, A.H.	1936	B. bischmai Clark, 1936	Colobometridae	extant	Quaternary (Holocene)	western Pacific	
Basleocrinus	Wanner	1916	B. pocillum Wanner, 1916	Basleocrinidae	extinct	Permian	Russia, Sicily, Timor	
Bassocrinus	Webster et al.	2009	B. abyssus Webster, et al., 2009	Cromyocrinidae	extinct	Pennsylvanian (Moscovian)	China	
Bathericrinus	Jaekel	1918	Botryocrinus ramosus Bather, 1891	Mastigocrinidae	extinct	Silurian (Wenlockian)	United Kingdom	
Bathronocrinus	Strimple	1962	B. turioformis Strimple, 1962	Laudonocrinidae	extinct	Pennsylvanian (Desmoinesian, Missourian & Virgilian)	United States	
Bathycrinus	Thomson	1872	B. gracilis Thomson, 1872	Bathycrinidae	extant	Quaternary (Holocene)		
Bathymetra	Clark	1908	Antedon abyssicola Carpenter, 1888	Antedonidae	extant	Quaternary (Holocene)	Antarctica & south Atlantic	
Batocrinus	Casseday	1854	B. icosidactylus Casseday, 1854	Batocrinidae	extinct	Mississippian (Tournaisian & Viséan)	United States	
Bazaricrinus	Stukalina	1968	B. bazarensis Stukalina, 1968	[columnal]	extinct	Silurian & Devonian	Russia & Kazakhstan	
Becharocrinus	Termier & Termier	1956	Triacrinus paradoxus Termier & Termier, 1950	uncertain (Camerata)	extinct	Pennsylvanian (Westphalian)	Morocco & Algeria	
Becsiecrinus	Ausich & Copper	2010	B. adonis Ausich & Copper, 2010	Dimerocrinitidae	extinct	Silurian (Llandoverian)	Canada	
Beecrinus	Dubatolova	1975	B. amplus Dubatolova, 1975	[columnal]	extinct	Devonian (Givetian)	Russia	
Belanskicrinus	Strimple & Levorson	1969	Bactrocrinus westoni Belanski, 1928	Mastigocrinidae	extinct	Devonian (Frasnian)	United States	
Belashovicrinus	Arendt & Zubarev	1993	B. gjelensis Arendt & Zubarev, 1993	Agassizocrinidae	extinct	Pennsylvanian (Gzhelian & Kasimovian) & Permian (Artinskian)	Russia	
Belemnocrinus	White	1862	B. typus White, 1862	Belemnocrinidae	extinct	Mississippian (Tournaisian & Viséan)	United States	
Belskayacrinus	Arendt	1997	B. turaevoensis Arendt, 1997	uncertain (Disparida)	extinct	Pennsylvanian (Moscovian)	Russia	
Belyaevicrinus	Mironov & Sorokina	1998	Hyocrinus (Belyaevicrinus) latipinnulus Mironov & Sorokina, 1998	Hyocrinidae	extant	Quaternary (Holocene)	Antarctic	
Bennettia (junior homonym of Bennettia Fowler, 1904 [Pisces]) [wiki link removed as it takes to a plant genus]	Clark	1909						
Benthocrinus	Wanner	1937	B. cryptobasalis Wanner, 1937	Timorechinidae	extinct	Permian	Timor	
Bereljicrinus	Stukalina	1980	Tetragonotetragonalis altaicus Yeltyschewa in Avrov and Stukalina, 1964	[columnal]	extinct	Silurian (Wenlockian)	Russia	
Betpakdalacrinus	Sisova	1991	B. cirriferum Sisova, 1991	[columnal]	extinct	Mississippian (Tournaisian)	Kazakhstan	
Beyrichocrinus	Waagen & Jahn	1899	B. humilis Waagen & Jahn, 1899	Periechocrinidae	extinct	Devonian	Czech Republic	
Bichirocrinus (Nomen nudum)	Jaekel	1918	.		extinct	Silurian	North America, Europe	
Biciclocrinus (Nomen nudum)	Ivanov	1926	B. calyciformis Ivanov, 1926		extinct	Pennsylvanian	Russia	
Bicidiocrinus	Strimple	1975	Hydreionocrinus wetherbyi Wachsmuth & Springer, 1886	Zeacrinitidae	extinct	Mississippian (Serpukhovian)	United States	
Bicostulatocrinus	Dubatolova & Yeltyschewa	1969	Cyclocyclicus circumvalatus Yeltyschewa in Dubatolova & Shao, 1959	[columnal]	extinct	Mississippian (Tournaisian) & Permian	Russia & China	
Bicyclocrinus	Sisova	1991	B. polystichus Sisova, 1991	[columnal]	extinct	Mississippian (Tournaisian)	Kazakhstan	
Bihaticrinus	Kristan-Tollmann	1990	B. manipulus Kristan-Tollmann, 1990	uncertain	extinct	Triassic (Norian)	Indonesia	
Bikocrinus	Ausich	1985	B. baios Ausich, 1985	Stelidiocrinidae	extinct	Silurian (Llandoverian)	United States	
Bilaterocolumnus	Donovan	1991	B. pinnatus Donovan, 1989	[columnal]	extinct	Ordovician (Darriwilian)	United Kingdom	
Bilecicrinus	Manni & Nicosia	1990	Bilecicrinus anatolicus Manni & Nicosia, 1990	Tetracrinidae	extinct	Jurassic (Sinemurian - Pliensbachian)	Switzerland, Turkey	
Binariacrinus	Webster et al.	2009	B. alveus Webster et al., 2009	Cromyocrinidae	extinct	Pennsylvanian (Moscovian)	China	
Birgenelocrinus	Jagt	1999	Birgenelocrinus degraafi Jagt, 1999	Roveacrinidae	extinct	Cretaceous (Maastrichtian)	Netherlands	
Blairocrinus	Miller	1891	B. trijugis Miller, 1891	Actinocrinitidae	extinct	Mississippian (Tournaisian & Viséan) & Pennsylvanian (Bashkirian)	United States, Algeria	
Blandicrinus	Stukalina & Dubatolova in Stukalina	1998	Anthinocrinus blandus Dubatolova, 1975	[columnal]	extinct	Devonian (Givetian)	Russia	
Blothrocrinus	Kirk	1940	Poteriocrinus jesupi Whitfield, 1881	Blothrocrinidae	extinct	Mississippian (Tournaisian & Viséan) & Pennsylvanian (Westphalian)	United States, Europe, Russia	
Blothronagma	Moore & Jeffords	1968	B. cinctutum Moore & Jeffords, 1968	[columnal]	extinct	Pennsylvanian (Atokan & Desmoinesian)	United States	
Bodacrinus	Donovan	1986	B. columnus Donovan, 1986	[columnal]	extinct	Ordovician (Katian)	Sweden	
Bogotacrinus	Schmidt	1937	B. scheibei Schmidt, 1937	Hapalocrinidae	extinct	Devonian (Emsian & Eifelian)	Colombia	
Bohemicocrinus (incorrectly spelled Bohemiocrinus by Sharpe, 1899)	Waagen & Jahn	1899	B. pulverens Waagen & Jahn, 1899	Carpocrinidae	extinct	Silurian (Pridolian & Ludlovian)	United States, Czech Republic	
Bohnerticrinus	Bohatý et al.	2014	B. nilsjungi Bohatý et al., 2014	Hexacrinitidae	extinct	Devonian (Eifelian)	Germany	
Bohuslavocrinus	Grygar & Vasícek	1983	B. grandis Grygar & Vašícek, 1983	[columnal]	extinct	Carboniferous (Namurian)	Czech Republic	
Bolbocrinus	Wanner	1916	B. hieroglyphicus Wanner, 1916	Codiacrinidae	extinct	Permian	Timor, Russia	
Bolboporites	Pander	1830	B. mitralis Pander, 1830	uncertain	extinct	Ordovician (Sandbian-Katian & Floian)	North America, Russia	
Bolicrinus	Witzke & Strimple	1981	B. globosus Witzke & Strimple, 1981	Patelliocrinidae	extinct	Silurian (Llandoverian)	United States	
Boliviacrinus	McIntosh	1988	B. isaacsoni McIntosh, 1988	Patelliocrinidae	extinct	Devonian (Eifelian)	Bolivia	
Bollandocrinus	Wright	1951	Poteriocrinus conicus Phillips, 1836	Scytalocrinidae	extinct	Mississippian (Tournaisian & Viséan)	China, United Kingdom	
Boleometra	Clark A.H.	1936	Antedon clio AH Clark, 1907	Antedonidae	extant	Quaternary (Holocene)	Japan	
Bornium	de Gregorio	1930	B. vetustum de Gregorio, 1930	[columnal]	extinct	Permian (Wordian)	Sicily	
Borucrinus	Ausich & Sevastopulo	2001	Dinotocrinus eirensis Wright, 1951	Staphylocrinidae	extinct	Mississippian (Tournaisian)	Ireland, Canada, United States	
Botryocrinus (incorrectly spelled Bothryocrinus by Zittel, 1895)	Angelin	1878	B. ramosissimus Angelin, 1878	Botryocrinidae	extinct	Silurian (Niagaran & Wenlockian) & Devonian	North America, Europe, Russia	
Bourgueticrinus	d'Orbigny	1841	Apiocrinites ellipticus Miller, 1821	Bourgueticrinidae	extinct	Cretaceous (Cenomanian) to Paleogene (Eocene)	Europe, USA	
Bouskacrinus	Prokop	2011	B. solus Prokop, 2011	Gasterocomidae	extinct	Devonian (Pragian)	Czech Republic	
Brabeocrinus	Strimple & Moore	1971	B. christinae Strimple & Moore, 1971	Gasterocomidae	extinct	Permian (Wolfcampian) & Pennsylvanian	United States	
Brachiocrinus (incorrectly spelled Brachyiocrinus by Bigsby, 1868 and Brachyocrinus by Shumard, 1868)	Hall	1858	B. nodosarius Hall, 1858	Myelodactylidae	extinct	Devonian (Lochkovian)	United States	
Brachiomonocrinus	Arendt	1974	Brachiomonocrinus simplex Arendt, 1974	Hemibrachiocrinidae	extinct	Cretaceous (Valanginian to Barremian)	Crimea, Czech Republic	
Brachypus (jun. syn. of Permobrachypus)	Wanner	1929	B. adhaerens Wanner, 1929					
Brahmacrinus (incorrectly spelled Brachmacrinus by Arendt & Hecker, 1964 and Brahamacrinus by Webster, 1993)	Sollas	1900	B. ponderosus Sollas, 1900	Platycrinitidae	extinct	Silurian (Niagaran) & Mississippian (Viséan & Tournaisian)	United States. United Kingdom, China	
Brechmocrinus	Ausich, Bolton, & Cummings	1998	B. eos Ausich, Bolton, & Cummings, 1998	Dendrocrinidae	extinct	Ordovician (Darriwilian)	Canada	
Breimerocrinus	Arendt	2002	B. laevis Arendt, 2002	[columnal]	extinct	Mississippian (Serpukhovian)	Russia	
Briarocrinus	Angelin	1878	B. inflatus Angelin, 1878	Patelliocrinidae	extinct	Silurian (Wenlockian)	Sweden	
Bridgerocrinus	Laudon & Severson	1953	B. fairyensis Laudon & Severson, 1953	Bridgerocrinidae	extinct	Devonian (Frasnian & Famernnian) & Mississippian (Tournaisian)	China, United States	
Briseocrinus	Prokop and Petr	1991	B. sculptilis Prokop and Petr, 1991	uncertain (Codiacrinoidea)	extinct	Devonian (Emsian)	Czech Republic	
Bromidocrinus	Kolata	1982	B. nodosus Kolata, 1982	Rhodocrinitidae	extinct	Ordovician (Sandbian)	United States	
Bronaughocrinus	Strimple	1951	B. figuratus Strimple, 1951	Phanocrinidae	extinct	Mississippian (Viséan & Serphukhovian)	United States	
Browerocrinus	Ausich, Peter & Ettenson	2015	B. arthrikos Ausich, Peter & Ettenson, 2015	Calceocrinidae	extinct	Silurian (Rhuddian)	United States	
Bruennichometra	Rasmussen	1961	Antedon danica Nielsen, 1913	Conometridae	extinct	Paleocene (Danian)	Denmark	
Brutopisocrinus	Prokop & Petr	1989	Pisocrinus bohemicus Bouska, 1956	Pisocrinidae	extinct	Silurian (Ludlovian) & Devonian (Lochkovian)	Czech Republic, Russia	
Brychiocrinus	Moore & Plummer	1940	B. texanus Moore & Plummer, 1940	Stellarocrinidae	extinct	Pennsylvanian (Desmoinesian)	United States	
Buchicrinus (jun. syn. of Isselicrinus Rovereto, 1914)	Klikushin	1977	Pentacrinites buchii Roemer, 1840					
Bucucrinus	Ausich & Copper	2010	B. saccus Ausich & Copper, 2010	Rhodocrinitidae	extinct	Silurian (Llandoverian)	Canada	
Bufalocrinus	Webster et al.	2003	Catactocrinus torus Webster & Hafley, 1999	Amabilicrinidae	extinct	Devonian (Famennian)	United States	
Bulbocrinus	Stukalina	1980	S. bacillaris Stukalina, 1980	[columnal]	extinct	Ordovician (Katian)	Kazakhstan	
Burdigalocrinus	Jaekel	1918	Burdigalocrinus lorioli Roemer, 1840	Thiolliericrinidae	extinct	Jurassic (Oxfordian) to Cretaceous (Berriasian)	Portugal, Crimea	
Burovicrinus	Stukalina & Kurilenko	2002	Pentagonocyclicus burovi Skoropisceva, 1969	[columnal]	extinct	Mississippian (Viséan & Serpukhovian) & Permian	Russia	
Bursacrinus	Meek & Worthen	1861	B. wachsmuthi Meek & Worthen, 1861	Bursacrinidae	extinct	Mississippian (Viséan)	United States	
Bystrowicrinus	Yeltyschewa	1963	Pentagonopentagonalis quinquelobatus Yeltyschewa, 1955	[columnal]	extinct	Ordovician, Silurian & Devonian	Russia, United Kingdom, Latvia, Estonia & Czech Republic	
Bythocrinus (jun. syn. of Democrinus)	Döderlein	1912	Rhizocrinus chuni Döderlein, 1907					Bythocrinus
Cacabocrinites (incorrectly spelled Cacabocrinus by Hall, 1862) (jun. syn. of Dolatocrinus)	Troost	1850	.					
Cactocrinus	Wachsmuth & Springer	1897	Actinocrinus proboscidialis Hall, 1858	Actinocrinitidae	extinct	Mississippian (Tournaisian & Viséan)	North America	
Cadiscocrinus	Kirk	1945	C. southworthi Kirk, 1945	Rhodocrinitidae	extinct	Devonian (Givetian)	Canada	
Cadocrinus	Wanner	1924	Hydreionocrinus variabilis Wanner, 1916	Cadocrinidae	extinct	Permian	Timor, Russia	
Caelocrinus	Xu	1962	C. stellifer Xu, 1962	Euspirocrinidae	extinct	Silurian	China	
Cainocrinus	Forbes	1852	Cainocrinus tintinnabulum Forbes, 1852 emend. Rasmussen, 1972	Cainocrinidae	extinct	Paleogene (Eocene)	England, Italy, Crimea, Poland	
Calamocrinus	Agassiz	1890	C. diomedae Agassiz, 1890	Hyocrinidae	extant	Quaternary (Holocene)	Panama	
Calathocrinus (jun. syn. of Dadocrinus)	von Meyer	1847	Calathocrinus digitatus (syn. Dadocrinus gracilis) von Meyer, 1847					
Calceocrinus	Hall	1852	Cheirocrinus chrysalis Hall, 1860	Calceocrinidae	extinct	Ordovician & Silurian	North America, Europe	
Calceolispongia	Etheridge (as a sponge)	1915	C. hindei Etheridge, 1915	Calceolispongiidae	extinct	Permian	Australia, India, Timor	
Caldenocrinus	Wright	1946	C. curtus Wright, 1946	Euryocrinidae	extinct	Mississippian (Viséan)	United Kingdom	
Caledonicrinus	Avocat & Roux	1990	C. vaubani Avocat & Roux, 1990	Bathycrinidae	extant	Quaternary (Holocene)	Philippines	
Caleidocrinus	Waagen & Jahn	1899	C. multiramus Wright, 1946	Euryocrinidae	extinct	Ordovician	Czech Republic & United States	
Callawaycrinus (jun. syn. of Dactylocrinus)	Rowley	1895	Taxocrinus concavus Rowley, 1893					
Calleocrinus	Dubatolova	1971	Pentagonocyclicus granatus Dubatolova, 1964	[columnal]	extinct	Devonian	France, Russia, Poland, Germany	
Calliocrinus (incorrectly spelled Calliocrinites by Chapman, 1857 & Callicrinus by Angelin, 1878)	d'Orbigny	1850	Eugeniacrinites costatus Hisinger, 1837	Eucalyptocrinitidae	extinct	Silurian & Devonian	United States, Russia, United Kingdom, Sweden	
Callistocrinus	Eckert & Brett	2001	C. tesselatus Eckert & Brett, 2001	Callistocrinidae	extinct	Silurian (Llandoverian)	United States	
Calocrinites (incorrectly spelled Calocrinus by Bather, 1900)	Steiniger	1849	C. emarginatus Steiniger, 1849	uncertain	extinct	Devonian (Eifelian)	Germany	
Calometra	Clark, A.H.	1907	Antedon callista Clark, A.H., 1907	Calometridae	extant	Quaternary (Holocene)	Japan	
Calpiocrinus	Angelin	1878	C. fimbriatus Angelin, 1878	Dactylocrinidae	extinct	Silurian (Wenlockian)	Europe	
Calycanthocrinus	Follman	1887	C. decadactylus Follman, 1887	Pisocrinidae	extinct	Devonian (Emsian & Eifelian)	Germany	
Calycocrinus	Wanner	1916	C. curvatus Wanner, 1916	Calycocrinidae	extinct	Pennsylvanian & Permian	United States, Russia, Timor	
Calyptometra (jun. syn. of Glyptometra)	Clark, A.H.	1916	Charitometra lateralis Clark, AH, 1908					
Carnallicrinus	Hagdorn	2004	Encrinus (Chelocrinus) carnalli Beyrich, 1856	Dadocrinidae	extinct	Triassic (Pelsonian & Illyrian)	Central Europe	
Camarocrinus (incorrectly spelled Camerocrinus by Fric, 1904)	Hall	1879	C. stellatus Hall, 1879	Scyphocrinitidae	extinct	Silurian (Pridoli) & Devonian (Lochkovian)	North America, Europe, China	
Campanulites (jun. syn. of Cleiocrinus)	Troost	1850	B. tesselatus Troost, 1850					
Campbellicrinus	Jell & Willink	1993	C. compactus Jell & Willink, 1993	Corythocrinidae	extinct	Permian (Sakmarian/Artinskian)	Oman	
Camptocrinus	Wachsmuth & Springer	1897	Dichocrinus (C.) myelodactylus Wachsmuth & Springer, 1897	Camptocrinidae	extinct	Mississippian, Pennsylvanian & Permian	United States, United Kingdom, Iran, Russia, Timor, Australian	
Canistrocrinus (incorrectly spelled Canistocrinus by Zittel, 1895)	Wachsmuth & Springer	1885	Glyptocrinus richardsoni Wetherby, 1880	Tanaocrinidae	extinct	Ordovician (Katian) & Silurian (Richmondian)	United States	
Cantharocrinus	Breimer	1962	C. minor Breimer, 1962	Hapalocrinidae	extinct	Devonian (Emsian, Eifelian & Famennian)	Spain, China	
Capillaster	Clark, A.H.	1909	Actinometra sentosa Carpenter, 1888	Comatulidae	extant	Quaternary (Holocene)	Madagascar to northern Australia, the Philippines & Japan	
Carabocrinus	Billings	1857	C. radiatus Billings, 1857	Porocrinidae	extinct	Ordovician	North America, Estonia	
Caragachicrinus	Stukalina	1980	C. quinquepartitus Stukalina, 1980	[columnal]	extinct	Ordovician (Darriwilian & Sandbian)	Kazakhstan	
Carinatocrinus	Arendt	2002	C. carinatus Arendt, 2002	[columnal]	extinct	Mississippian (Serpukhovian)	Russia	
Carcinocrinus	Laudon	1941	C. stevensi Laudon, 1941	Blothrocrinidae	extinct	Mississippian (Serpukhovian)	United States	
Carduoctinus (jun. syn. of Lophocrinus)	von Koenen	1895	C. jaekeli von Koenen, 1895					
Carlopsocrinus	Wright	1933	C. bullatus Wright, 1933	uncertain (Dendrocrinida)	extinct	Mississippian (Viséan)	United Kingdom	
Carolicrinus	Waagen & Jahn	1899	C. barrandei Waagen & Jahn, 1899	Scyphocrinitidae	extinct	Silurian (Pridoli)	Czech Republic, China	
Carpocrinus (incorrectly spelled Carpiocrinites by Geintz, 1846 & Carpiocrinus by Agassiz, 1842)	Müller	1840	Actinocrinites simplex Phillips in Murchison, 1839	Carpocrinidae	extinct	Silurian & Devonian	North America, Europe	
Caryometra	AH Clark	1936	Adelometra AH Clark, 1908	Antedonidae	extant	Quaternary (Holocene)	Caribbean	
Cassianocrinus	Laube	1865	Encrinus (Cassianocrinus) tetarakontadactylus Laube, 1865	Encrinidae	extinct	Triassic (Ladinian & Carnian)	southern Alps	
Castanocrinus (jun. syn. of Melocrinites)	Roemer	1854	Melocrinites gibbosus Goldfuss, 1831					
Castocrinus (incorrectly spelled Castrocrinus by Wachsmuth & Springer, 1891) (jun. syn. of Cremacrinus)	Ringueberg	1889	.					
Catacrinus (jun. syn. of Delocrinus)	Knapp	1969	Delocrinus subhemisphericus Moore & Plummer, 1940					
Catactocrinus	Goldring	1923	C. leptodactylus Goldring, 1923	Glossocrinidae	extinct	Devonian (Frasnian)	United States	
Catagraphiocrinus	Stukalina	1968	C. carinatus Arendt, 2002	[columnal]	extinct	Mississippian (Serpukhovian)	Russia	
Cataractocrinus	Eckert	1984	C. clementi Eckert, 1984	Eustenocrinidae	extinct	Silurian (Llandoverian)	Canada	
Cataraquicrinus	Kolata	1983	C. elongatus Kolata, 1983	Homocrinidae	extinct	Ordovician (Darriwilian)	Canada	
Cathetocrinus	Knapp	1969	Delocrinus stullensis Strimple, 1947	Catacrinidae	extinct	Pennsylvanian (Virgilian)	United States	
Catholicorhachis	Moore & Jeffords	1968	C. multifaria Moore & Jeffords, 1968	[columnal]	extinct	Pennsylvanian (Desmoinesian)	United States	
Catillocrinus (Catillocrinites by Troost, 1850 [nomen nudum] & incorrectly spelled Catillicrinus by Miller, 1889)	Shumard	1865	C. tennesseeae Shumard, 1865	Catillocrinidae	extinct	Pennsylvanian (Virgilian)	United States	
Catoptometra	AH Clark	1908	Antedon harlaubi AH Clark, 1907	Zygometridae	extant	Quaternary (Holocene)	Japan to the Sunda Islands	
Caucacrocrinus	Moore & Strimple	1969	C. urnula Moore & Strimple, 1969	Acrocrinidae	extinct	Pennsylvanian (Missourian)	United States	
Cefnocrinus	Botting	2003	C. samgilmouri Botting, 2003	Rhodocrinitidae	extinct	Ordovician (Darriwilian)	United Kingdom	
Celonocrinus	Lane & Webster	1966	C. expansus Lane & Webster, 1966	Stellarocrinidae	extinct	Pennsylvanian (Desmoinesian & Missourian) & Permian (Wolfcampian)	United States	
Celtocrinus	Donovan & Cope	1989	C. ubaghsi Donovan & Cope, 1989	uncertain (Monobathrida)	extinct	Ordovician (Floian)	United Kingdom	
Cenericrinus	Le Menn	1976	C. tenuis Le Menn, 1976	[columnal]	extinct	Devonian (Pragian)	France	
Cenocrinus	Thomson	1864	Isis asteria Linnaeus, 1767	Isselicrinidae	extant	Quaternary (Holocene)	Caribbean	
Cenolia	AH Clark	1916	Comatula trichoptera Müller, 1846	Comatulidae	extant	Quaternary (Holocene)	Japan, Oceania, Australia, New Zealand, Indian Ocean	
Cenometra	AH Clark	1909	Himerometra unicornis AH Clark, 1908 (now syn. under C. bella)	Colobometridae	extant	Quaternary (Holocene)	Ceylon to Philippines	
Centriocrinus (replacement for Centrocrinus Wachsmuth & Springer, 1881, jun. hom. of Centrocrinus Austin & Austin, 1843)	Bather	1899	Actinocrinus pentaspinus Lyon, 1869	Patelliocrinidae	extinct	Devonian (Emsian)	United States	
Centrocrinus (jun. syn. of Platycrinites)	Austin & Austin	1843	Platycrinites gigas Gilbertson in Phillips, 1836					
Ceramocrinus (jun. syn. of Gasterocoma)	Müller	1855	C. eifeliensis Wirtgen & Zeiler, 1855					
Cerasmocrinus	Strimple & Levorson	1973	Hexacrinus springeri Thomas, 1924	Carpocrinidae	extinct	Devonian (Frasnian)	United States	
Ceratocrinus	Wanner	1937	C. exornatus Wanner, 1937	Cyathocrinitidae	extinct	Permian	West Timor	
Cercidocrinus	Kirk	1938	Poteriocrinus bursaeformis White, 1862	Cercidocrinidae	extinct	Mississippian (Tournaisian & Viséan)	United States	
Ceriocrinus (jun. syn. of Delocrinus)	White	1880	.					
Cestocrinus	Kirk	1940	Cyathocrinus signatus Miller & Gurley, 1893	Lecythocrinidae	extinct	Mississippian (Viséan)	United States	
Chakomicrinus	Stukalina	2000	C. quinquepartitus Stukalina, 2000	uncertain (Dendrocrinoidea)	extinct	Silurian	Russia	
Changninocrinus (jun. syn. of Cantharocrinus)	Chen, Yao & Yu	1985	C. sphaeroides Chen, Yao & Yu, 1985					
Chaosocrinus	Donovan	1993	C. ornatus Donovan, 1993	Rhodocrinitidae	extinct	Silurian (llandoverian)	United Kingdom	
Charactocrinus	Brett	1981	C. pustulosus Brett, 1981	Calceocrinidae	extinct	Ordovician (Hirnantian) & Silurian (Wenlockian)	North America	
Charientocrinus	Goldring	1923	C. ithacensis Goldring, 1923	Glossocrinidae	extinct	Devonian (Givetian & Frasnian)	United States	
Charitometra	Clark	1907	Antedon incisa Carpenter, 1888	Charitometridae	extant	Quaternary (Holocene)	Japan to Australia and South Africa	
Cheirocrinus (jun. syn. of Synchirocrinus)	Salter	1859	C. serialis Salter, 1859					
Cheirocrinus (jun. hom. of Cheirocrinus Eichwald, 1856; jun.syn. of Calceocrinus)	Hall	1860	C. chrysalis Hall, 1860					
Chelocrinus (incorrectly spelled Chelocrinites by Geinitz, 1846)	Meyer	1837	Encrinites schlotheimi Quenstedt, 1835	Encrinidae	extinct	Triassic (Anisian & Carnian)	Europe	
Chenocrinus	Ausich & Copper	2010	C. canadaensis Ausich & Copper, 2010	Stipatocrinidae	extinct	Silurian (Llandoverian)	Canada	
Cherbonniericrinus	Roux, Eléaume & Améziane	2019	Conocrinus cherbonnieri Roux, 1976	Rhizocrinidae	extant	Quaternary (Holocene)	NE Atlantic	
Chicagocrinus	Weller	1900	C. ornatus Weller, 1900	Eucalyptocrinitidae	extinct	Silurian (Niagaran)	United States	
Chinacrinus	Lane, Waters, and Maples	1997	C. xinjiangensis Lane, Waters, and Maples, 1997	Platycrinitidae	extinct	Devonian (Famennian)	China	
Chingizocrinus	Stukalina	1982	Pentagonopentagonalis kokajgirensis Stukalina, 1960	[columnal]	extinct	Silurian (Llandoverian)	Kazakhstan	
Chirocrinus	Angelin	1878	C. gotlandicus Angelin, 1878	Calceocrinidae	extinct	Ordovician (Katian) & Silurian (Llandoverian & Wenlockian)	Canada, United Kingdom, Sweden	
Chiropinna	Moore	1962	Calceocrinus pinnulatus Bather, 1893	Calceocrinidae	extinct	Silurian (Wenlockian)	Sweden	
Chlidonocrinus (incorrectly spelled Chilidonocrinus by Lane & Sevastopulo, 1990)	Strimple & Watkins	1969	C. echinatus Strimple & Watkins, 1969	Ampelocrinidae	extinct	Mississippian (Serpukovian) & Pennsylvanian (Atokan & Missourian)	United States	
Chlorometra	Clark AH	1909	Antedon garrettiana A.H. Clark, 1907	Charitometridae	extant	Quaternary (Holocene)	Meangis Islands to Korea	
Cholocrinus	Springer	1906	Forbesiocrinus obesus Angelin, 1878	Nipterocrinidae	extinct	Silurian (Wenlockian)	Sweden	
Chondrometra	Clark, AH	1916	Chlorometra robusta A.H. Clark, 1911	Charitometridae	extant	Quaternary (Holocene)	Timor to the Philippines	
Chytrocrinus (jun. syn. of Stelidiocrinus)	Jaekel	1918	Stelidiocrinus laevis Angelin, 1878 (part)					
Cibolocrinus	Weller	1909	C. typus Weller, 1909	Mespilocrinidae	extinct	Mississippian, Pennsylvanian & Permian	United States, Russia, Algeria, Bolivia, Sicily, Timor	
Cicerocrinus	Sollas	1900	C. elegans Sollas, 1900	Pisocrinidae	extinct	Silurian (Ludlovian)	United Kingdom, Estonia, Sweden	
Cincinnaticrinus	Warn & Strimple	1977	C. varibrachialus Warn & Strimple, 1977	Cincinnaticrinidae	extinct	Odrovician (Sandbian & Katian)	North America	
Cingocrinus	Mironov	2000	C. radicatus Mironov, 2000	Bathycrinidae	extant	Quaternary (Holocene)	.	
Cionerisma	Moore & Jeffords	1968	C.exile Moore & Jeffords, 1968	[columnal]	extinct	Silurian (Niagaran)	United States	
Circumbrella (nomen nudum) (incorrectly spelled Cyclumbrella on plate explanation)	Termier & Termier	1974	.	[columnal]	extinct	Devonian	Morocco	
Cladocrinites (jun. syn. of Taxocrinus) (incorrectly spelled Cladocrinus by Morris, 1843)	Austin & Austin	1843	Poteriocrinutes egertoni Phillips, 1836					
Cladostoma (unrecognizable)	Rafinesque	1819						
Clarkcomanthus	Rowe, Hoggett, Birtles & Vail	1986	Comanthus luteofuscum HL Clark, 1915	Comatulidae	extant	Quaternary (Holocene)	Western Pacific; Australia & Indonesia to Japan	
Clarkeocrinus	Goldring	1923	Cacabocrinus troosti Hall, 1862	Dolatocrinidae	extinct	Devonian (Givetian & Eifelian)	North America, Germany	
Clarkometra	Gislén	1922	C. elegans Gislén, 1922	Colobometridae	extant	Quaternary (Holocene)	Japan	
Clathrocrinus	Strimple & Moore	1971	C. clathratus Strimple & Moore, 1971	Clathrocrinidae	extinct	Pennsylvanian (Atokan & Missourian)	United States	
Clavaticrinus	Polozhichina	1980	C. lobatus Polozhichina, 1980	[columnal]	extinct	Devonian	Kazakhstan, Russia	
Claviculacrinus	Donovan	1989	C. scoticus Donovan, 1989	uncertain (Dendrocrinida)	extinct	Ordovician (Katian)	United Kingdom	
Cleiocrinus (incorrectly spelled Cliocrinus by Miller, 1892 & Cleistocrinus by Ludwig, 1906)	Billings	1857	C. regius Billings, 1857	Cleiocrinidae	extinct	Ordovician (Darriwilian, Sandbian & Katian)	North America	
Cleistocrinus	Springer	1920	Calpiocrinus humilis Angelin, 1878	Icthyocrinidae	extinct	Silurian (Wenlockian)	Sweden	
Clematidiscus	Moore & Jeffords	1968	C. denotatus Moore & Jeffords, 1968	[columnal]	extinct	Devonian (Pragian)	United States	
Clematocrinus	Jaekel	1898	Actinocrinites retarius Phillips, 1839	Hapalocrinidae	extinct	Silurian & Devonian	United States, United Kingdom, Australia	
Clidochirus (incorrectly spelled Clidocrinus by Wanner, 1916)	Angelin	1878	C. pyrum Angelin, 1878	Icthyocrinidae	extinct	Ordovician (Katian) through Mississippian (Viséan)	United States, Sweden	
Clistocrinus	Kirk	1937	C. pyriformis Kirk, 1937	Streblocrinidae	extinct	Devonian, Pennsylvanian & Permian	United States, Russia	
Clitheroecrinus	Ausich & Kammer	2008	C. wrighti Ausich & Kammer, 2008	Periechocrinidae	extinct	Mississippian (Tournaisian)	United Kingdom	
Clithrocrinus (unnecessary replacement for Clistocrinus)	Kirk	1937						
Clonocrinus	Quenstedt	1876	C. gothlandicus Quenstedt, 1876	Clonocrinidae	extinct	Silurian & Devonian	United States, United Kingdom	
Clonocrinus (jun. syn. of Melocrinites)	Oehlert	1879	C. bigsbyi Oehlert, 1879					
Closterocrinus	Hall	1852	C. elongatus Hall, 1852	Euspirocrinidae	extinct	Silurian (Niagaran)	United States	
Cnemecrinus	Guensburg & Sprinkle	2003	C. fillmorensis Guensburg & Sprinkle, 2003	Reteocrinidae	extinct	Ordovician (Tremedocian)	United States	
Coccocrinus (jun. syn. of Amblacrinus)	Müller	1855	B. rosaceus Roemer, 1844					
Coccometra	Clark, AH	1908	Comatula hagenii Pourtalès, 1868	Antedonidae	extant	Quaternary (Holocene)	Caribbean	
Codiacrinus	Schultze	1866	C. granulatus Schultze, 1866	Codiacrinidae	extinct	Silurian & Devonian	Australia, Europe, North Africa	
Codonocrinites (jun. syn. of Pterotocrinus) (incorrectly spelled Codonocrinus by Shumard, 1866)	Troost	1850	C. gracilis Troost, 1850					
Coeliocrinus	White	1863	Poteriocrinus dilatatus Hall, 1861	Cercidocrinidae	extinct	Mississippian (Viséan) & Permian (Sakmarian)	United States	
Coelocrinus (replacement name for Sphaerocrinus Meek & Worthen, 1865)	Meek & Worthen	1865	Actinocrinus (Amphoracrinus) concavus Meek & Worthen, 1861	Coelocrinidae	extinct	Mississippian (Viséan)	United States	
Coelocrinus (jun. syn. of Rhaphanocrinus)	Salter	1866	.					
Coenocrinus	Valette	1934	C. elegans Valette, 1934	Stachyocrinidae	extinct	Permian (Wormian)	Tunisia	
Coenocystis (incorrectly spelled Coencystis by Peck, 1936)	Girty	1908	C. richardsoni Girty, 1908	Streblocrinidae	extinct	Pennsylvanian (Atokan) & Permian (Guadalupian)	United States, Timor	
Collicrinus	Ausich & Kammer	2009	C. shumardi Ausich & Kammer, 2009	Platycrinitidae	extinct	Mississippian (Tournaisian & Viséan)	United States	
Colobometra	Clark, AH	1909	Antedon perspinosa Carpenter, 1881	Colobometridae	extant	Quaternary (Holocene)	south west Pacific and Red Sea	
Colpodecrinus	Sprinkle & Kolata	1982	C. quadrifinus Sprinkle & Kolata, 1982	Colpodecrinidae	extinct	Ordovician (Sandbian)	United States	
Columbicrinus (incorrectly spelled Columbiacrinus by Ulrich, 1925)	Ulrich	1925	C. crassus Ulrich, 1925	Columbicrinidae	extinct	Ordovician (Sandbian & Katian)	United States	
Comactinia	Clark	1909	Alecto echinoptera Müller, 1840	Comatulidae	extant	Quaternary (Holocene)	Western Atlantic	
Comantheria (jun. syn. of Comanthus)	Clark, AH	1909	Antedon briareus Bell, 1884					
Comanthina (jun. syn. of Comaster)	Clark, AH	1909	Actinometra nobilis Carpenter, 1888					
Comanthocrinus	Springer	1921	Stereocrinus indianensis Miller & Gurley, 1897	Dolatocrinidae	extinct	Devonian (Emsian & Givetian)	United States	
Comanthoides (jun. syn. of Cenolia)	Clark, AH	1931	Comanthus spanoschistum HL Clark, 1916					
Comanthus	Clark	1908	Alecto parvicirra Müller, 1841	Comatulidae	extant	Quaternary (Holocene)	Philippines	
Comaster	Agassiz	1836	Comatula multiradiata Lamarck, 1816	Comatulidae	extant	Quaternary (Holocene)	Western Pacific	
Comatella	Clark, AH	1908	Actinometra nigra Carpenter, 1888	Comatulidae	extant	Quaternary (Holocene)	Philippines	
Comatilia	Clark	1909	C. iridometriformis Clark, 1909	Comatulidae	extant	Quaternary (Holocene)	Bahamas	
Comatonia	Clark, AH	1916	Antedon cristata Harlaub, 1912	Antedonidae	extant	Quaternary (Holocene)	Caribbean	
Comatula	Lamarck	1816	C. solaris Lamarck, 1816	Comatulidae	extant	Quaternary (Holocene)	Philippines to Sri Lanka	
Comatulella	Clark, AH	1911	Comatula brachiolata Lamarck, 1816	Comatulidae	extant	Quaternary (Holocene)	Australia	
Comatulides	Clark	1918	Comanthus decameros Clark, 1908	Comatulidae	extant	Quaternary (Holocene)	Japan to Sunda Islands	
Cominia (jun. hom. of Cominia Brown, 1844 (Mollusca) - see Comatulides)	Clark, AH	1909	Comanthus decameros Clark, 1908					
Comissia	Clark, AH	1909	C. luetkeni Clark, 1909	Comatulidae	extant	Quaternary (Holocene)	Red Sea to Australia and north to Japan	
Compagicrinus	Jobson & Paul	1979	C. fenestratus Jobson & Paul, 1979	Dendrocrinidae	extinct	Ordovician (Floian)	Greenland	
Compositocrinus	Stukalina	1979	Pentagonopentagonalis compositus Yeltyschewa, 1955	[columnal]	extinct	Ordovician (Darriwilain & Sandbian) & Silurian (Llandoverian)	Russia, Tadzhikistan	
Compsocrinus	Miller, SA	1883	Glyptocrinus harrisi Miller, SA, 1881	Tanaocrinidae	extinct	Ordovician & Silurian	United States	
Compsometra (jun. syn. of Antedon)	Clark, AH	1908	Antedon loveni Bell, 1882					
Comptocrinus	Stukalina	1979	Pentagonopentagonalis comptus Yeltyschewa, 1955	[columnal]	extinct	Ordovician & Silurian	Russia	
Concavicrinus	Stukalina	1997	Pentagonopentagonalis comptus Yeltyschewa, 1955	[columnal]	extinct	Ordovician & Silurian	Russia	
Concretum	de Gregorio	1930	C. perplexum de Gregorio, 1930	[columnal]	extinct	Permian (Wordian)	Sicily	
Condylocrinus	Eichwald	1860	C. verrucosus Eichwald, 1860	Rhodocrinitidae	extinct	Devonian	Russia	
Conicocyathocrinites	Frest	1977	Cyathocrinus wilsoni Springer, 1926	Cyathocrinitidae	extinct	Silurian (Wenlockian & Niagaran)	United States, Sweden	
Conocrinites (nomen nudum - see Alloprosallocrinus) (incorrectly spelled Conocrinus by Shumard, 1866)	Troost	1850						
Conocrinus	d'Orbigny	1850	Bourgueticrinus thorenti d'Archiac, 1846	Rhizocrinidae	extant	Cenozoic	Indonesia & NE Atlantic	
Conspectocrinus (incorrectly spelled Conspeciocrinus by Jeffords in Moore & Teichert, 1978)	Stukalina	1969	C. conspectus Stukalina, 1969	[columnal]	extinct	Ordovician (Darriwilian, Sandbian & Katian)	Kazakhstan, Uzbekistan, Russia, France	
Constrictocrinus	Hynda	1984	C. gibberulosus Hynda, 1984	[columnal]	extinct	Ordovician (Sandbian) & Silurian (Wenlockian)	Russia	
Contignatindocrinus	Arendt	1981	Indocrinus contignatus Wanner, 1931	Indocrinidae	extinct	Permian	West Timor	
Contocrinus	Knapp	1969	Graphiocrinus stantonensis Strimple, 1939	Graphiocrinidae	extinct	Pennsylvanian & Permian	United States, Thailand	
Cophinus	Murchison	1839	C. dubius Murchison, 1839	[columnal]	extinct	Silurian (Ludlovian)	United Kingdom	
Coquinacrinus	Webster & Becker	2009	C. revimentus Webster & Becker, 2009	Amabilicrinidae	extinct	Devonian (Frasnian)	Morocco	
Coralcrinus	Gil Cid, Alonso & Pobes	1998	C. sarachagorum Gil Cid, Alonso & Pobes, 1998	Eustenocrinidae	extinct	Ordovician (Darriwilian)	Spain	
Cordonicrinus	Stukalina	1980	C. petaloides Stukalina, 1980	[columnal]	extinct	Ordovician (Darriwilian)	KAzakhstan	
Cordylocrinus	Angelin	1878	C. comtus Angelin, 1878	Hapalocrinidae	extinct	Silurian (Wenlockian) & Devonian (Helderbergian)	United States, Sweden	
Corematocrinus	Goldring	1923	C. plumosus Goldring, 1923	Glossocrinidae	extinct	Devonian (Frasnian)	United States	
Cornucrinus	Regnéll	1948	C. mirus Regnéll, 1948	Cornucrinidae	extinct	Ordovician (Katian) & Silurian (Llandoverian)	Sweden	
Corocrinus	Goldring	1923	C. ornatus Goldring, 1923	Periechocrinidae	extinct	Ordovician (Katian) & Silurian (Llandoverian)	Sweden	
Coronocrinus (jun. syn. of Himerocrinus)	Hall	1859	C. polydactylus Hall, 1859					
Corvucrinus	Ausich & Copper	2010	C. schucherti Ausich & Copper, 2010	Calceocrinidae	extinct	Ordovician (Katian) & Silurian (Llandoverian)	Sweden	
Corybocrinus (jun. syn. of Clonocrinus)	Angelin	1878	Eucalyptocrinus polydactylus M'Coy, 1849					
Corynecrinus	Kirk	1934	C. romingeri Kirk, 1934	Gasterocomidae	extinct	Devonian (Emsian & Eifelian)	United States	
Corythocrinus	Kirk	1946	C. insculptus Kirk, 1946	Corythocrinidae	extinct	Mississippian (Viséan)	United States	
Corythocrinus (jun. hom. of Corythocrinus Kirk 1946 & jun. syn. of Endelocrinus)	Strimple	1961	C. undulatus Strimple, 1961					
Cosmetocrinus	Kirk	1941	C. gracilus Kirk, 1941	Aphelecrinidae	extinct	Devonian, Mississippian & Permian	United States, China, United Kingdom	
Cosmiometra	Clark	1909	Thalassometra komachi Clark, 1908	Thalassometridae	extant	Quaternary (Holocene)	N Australia to Japan & Hawaii	
Cosmocrinus	Jaekel	1898	C. holzapfeli Jaekel, 1898	Dendrocrinidae	extinct	Devonian, Mississippian & Permian	United States, China, United Kingdom	
Costalocrinus	Jaekel	1918	Poteriocrinus dilatatus Schultze, 1867	Botryocrinidae	extinct	Devonian & Mississippian	United States, China, United Kingdom	
Costatocrinus	Stukalina	1975	Pentagonocyclicus bicostatus Stukalina, 1961	[columnal]	extinct	Silurian & Devonian	Russia, Kazakhstan, Uzbekistan	
Cothocrinites (incorrectly spelled Cothocrinus by Zittel, 1879)	Phillipi	1876	C. verrucosus Phillipi, 1876	Platycrinitidae	extinct	Devonian? or Mississippian?	Chile	
Cotylacrinna	Brower	1994	C. sandra Brower, 1994	Rhodocrinitidae	extinct	Ordovician (Katian)	North America	
Cotyledonocrinus (jun. syn. of Dichocrinus)	Casseday & Lyon	1862	C. pentalobus Casseday & Lyon, 1862					
Cotylocrinus	Dubatolova	1971	Pentagonocyclicus insignis Dubatolova, 1964	[columnal]	extinct	Devonian	Russia	
Cotylometra	Clark, AH	1916	Oligometra gracilicirra Clark, 1908	Colobometridae	extant	Quaternary (Holocene)	Philippines to Kei & Andaman Islands	
Cradeocrinus	Goldring	1923	C. elongatus Goldring, 1923	Thalamocrinidae	extinct	Devonian (Givetian & Frasnian) & Mississippian (Tournaisian)	North America, South Africa	
Cranocrinus	Wanner	1929	C. timoricus Wanner, 1929	Codiacrinidae	extinct	Pennsylvanian (Morrowan) & Permian	United States, Russia, Timor	
Craspedocrinus	Dahmer	1921	C. schmidti Dahmer, 1921	uncertain (Camerata)	extinct	Devonian	Germany	
Craspedometra	Clark, AH	1909	Antedon acuticirra Carpenter, 1882	Himerometridae	extant	Quaternary (Holocene)	Australia north to Singapore & Hong Kong	
Craterocrinus	Goldring	1923	C. ruedemanni Goldring, 1923	Dolatocrinidae	extinct	Devonian (Esmian)	United States	
Cremacrinus	Ulrich	1886	C. punctatus Ulrich, 1886	Calceocrinidae	extinct	Ordovician & Silurian	North America, United Kingdom	
Crenatames	Moore & Jeffords	1968	C. amicabilis Moore & Jeffords, 1968	[columnal]	extinct	Devonian	United States	
Crenatocrinus	Hynda	1984	Poteriocrinus biplex Eichwald, 1860	[columnal]	extinct	Ordovician (Darriwilian & Katian)	Russia, Estonia	
Cribanocrinus	Kirk	1944	Rhodocrinus wortheni Hall, 1858	Rhodocrinitidae	extinct	Mississippian (Tournaisian & Viséan)	United States, Australia, China	
Cricocrinus (jun. syn. of Neoprotencrinus)	Strimple & Watkins	1969	Paradelocrinus regulatus Strimple, 1949					
Crinerocrinus	Kolata	1982	C. parvicostatus Kolata, 1982	Rhodocrinitidae	extinct	Ordovician (Sandbiab)	United States	
Crinobrachiatus	Moore	1962	Myelodactylus brachiatus Hall, 1852	Myelodactylidae	extinct	Silurian (Niagaran)	North America	
Crinocystites (jun. syn. of Eucalyptocrinites) (incorrectly spelled Crinocystis by Haeckel, 1896)	Hall	1865	C. chrysalis Hall, 1865					
Crinometra	Clark, AH	1909	Comatula brevipinna Pourtalès, 1868	Charitometridae	extant	Quaternary (Holocene)	Gulf of Mexico & Caribbean	
Crinophagus	Arendt	1985	C. permiensis Arendt, 1985	Indocrinidae	extinct	Permian (Artinskian)	Russia	
Crisantum	de Gregorio	1930	C. stevensoni de Gregorio, 1930	[columnal]	extinct	Permian (Wordian)	Sicily	
Cromyocrinus	Trautschold	1867	C. simplex Trautschold, 1867	Cromyocrinidae	extinct	Mississippian (Viséan) & Pennsylvanian (Moscovian)	Russia, Spain, United States	
Crossometra (jun. syn. of Glyptometra)	Clark, AH	1916	Pachylometra investigatoris Clark, 1909					
Crossotocrinus	Dubatolova	1971	Pentagonocyclicus cortinatus Dubatolova, 1968	[columnal]	extinct	Devonian	Russia	
Crotalocrinites (incorrectly spelled Crotalocrinus by Morris, 1843)	Austin & Austin	1842	Cyathocrinites rugosus Miller, 1821	Crotalocrinitidae	extinct	Silurian & Devonian	United States, Europe, Russia, Australia	
Crotalometra	Clark, AH	1909	C. rustica Clark, 1909	Thalassometridae	extant	Quaternary (Holocene)	Philippines to South Africa	
Crumenaecrinites (jun. syn. of Periechocrinus) (incorrectly spelled Crumenaecrinus by Bather, 1900)	Troost	1850	C. ovalis Troost, 1850					
Cryphiocrinus	Kirk	1929	C. girtyi Kirk, 1929	Phanocrinidae	extinct	Mississippian (Viséan & Serpukhovian)	United States	
Cryptanisocrinus	Donovan, Doyle & Harper	1992	C. kirbridensis Donovan, Doyle & Harper, 1992	Homalocrinidae	extinct	Silurian (Llandoverian)	Ireland	
Cryptodiscus (jun. syn. of Calliocrinus)	Hall	1865	C. bilobus Weller, 1897					^{: PLATE 11 fig 18 (page not numbered)}
Ctenantedon	Meyer	1972	C. kinziei Meyer, 1972	Antedonidae	extant	Quaternary (Holocene)	Colombia & Curaçao	
Ctenocrinus (incorrectly spelled Ctenocrinites by Steininger, 1849)	Bronn	1840	C. typus Bronn, 1840	Melocrinitidae	extinct	Silurian & Devonian	United States, Europe	
Cuboidicrinus (incorrectly spelled Cuboidocrinus by Stukalina, 1967 & Cuboidecrinus by Stukalina, 1986)	Stukalina	1980	C. cuboides Stukalina, 1980	[columnal]	extinct	Ordovician (Katian)	Kazakhstan	
Culicocrinus (incorrectly spelled Cylicocrinus by Bather, 1900)	Müller	1855	Platycrinus nodosus Müller in Zeiler and Wirtgen, 1854	Hapalocrinidae	extinct	Ordovician, Silurian, Devonian & Pennsylvanian	United States, Germany	
Culmicrinus	Jaekel	1918	Poteriocrinus regularis von Meyer, 1858	Blothrocrinidae	extinct	Mississippian (Tournaisian, Visean & Serpukhovian)	United States	
Cunctocrinus	Kesling and Sigler	1969	C. fortunatus Kesling and Sigler, 1969	Calceocrinidae	extinct	Devonian (Givetian)	United States	
Cupellaecrinites (jun. syn. of Marsupiocrinus) (incorrectly spelled Cupellaecrinus by Shumard, 1868 & Cupellaeocrinus by Meek & Worthen, 1866 & Cypellaeocrinus by Bather, 1899)	Troost	1850	C. buchii Troost, 1850					
Cupressocrinites (incorrectly spelled Cupressocrinus by Agassiz, 1836 & Cypellocrinites & Cypressocrinites Steininger, 1849 & Cypellocrinus & Cypressocrinus Bather, 1900)	Goldfuss	1831	C. crassus Goldfuss, 1831	Cupressocrinitidae	extinct	Silurian & Devonian	Europe, Australia, Russia, India	
Cupulocrinus	d'Orbigny	1849	Scyphocrinus heterocostalis Hall, 1847	Cupulocrinidae	extinct	Ordovician, Silurian & Devonian	North America, Australia, United Kingdom	
Cusacrinus	Bowsher	1955	Actinocrinus nodobrachiatus Wachsmuth & Springer, 1889	Actinocrinitidae	extinct	Mississippian (Tournaisian & Viséan)	United States	
Cyathidium	Steenstrup	1847	Cyathidium holopus Steenstrup, 1847	Holopodidae	extant	Mesozoic (Jurassic & Cretaceous) & Cenozoic	Caribbean, Pacific, Comoros	
Cyathocrinites (incorrectly spelled Cyathocrinus by Agassiz, 1836 & Cathocrinus by Miller, SA, 1897)	Miller	1821	C. planus Miller, 1821	Cyathocrinitidae	extinct	Silurian - Permian	United States, Russia, China, Europe, Argentina, Pakistan	
Cybelecrinus	Ausich & Copper	2010	C. ladus Ausich & Copper, 2010	Dimerocrinitidae	extinct	Silurian (Llandoverian)	Canada	
Cyclocaudex	Moore & Jeffords	1968	C. typicus Moore & Jeffords, 1968	[columnal]	extinct	Devonian, Mississippian, Pennsylvanian	Brazil, United Kingdom, United States, Poland, Mexico	
Cyclocaudiculus	Moore & Jeffords	1968	C. regularis Moore & Jeffords, 1968	[columnal]	extinct	Devonian, Mississippian, Pennsylvanian	Poland, United Kingdom, Czech Republic, United States	
Cyclocharax	Moore & Jeffords	1968	C. fasciatus Moore & Jeffords, 1968	[columnal]	extinct	Ordovician, Silurian, Mississippian, Pennsylvanian	Spain, Poland, United States, Russia	
Cyclocion	Moore & Jeffords	1968	C. distinctus Moore & Jeffords, 1968	[columnal]	extinct	Devonian, Mississippian	Kazakhstan	
Cyclocrinites (formerly regarded as crinoid, now referred to algae) (incorrectly spelled Cyclocrinus by various authors)	Eichwald	1840						
Cyclocrista	Moore & Jeffords	1968	C. lineolata Moore & Jeffords, 1968	[columnal]	extinct	Mississippian, Pennsylvanian, Permian	Poland, United States, Russia, Tunisia	
Cyclocyclicus	Yeltyschewa	1955	C. tenuis Yeltyschewa, 1955	[columnal]	extinct	Ordovician to Permian	Russia, China, Uzbekistan, United Kingdom, Kazakhstan, Poland, Estonia	
Cyclocyclopa (nomen nudum)	Wright	1983	.	[columnal]	extinct	Ordovician (Katian)	United Kingdom	
Cyclohexagonalis	Donovan (non Yeltyschewa)	1989	C. floreatus Donovan, 1989	[columnal]	extinct	Ordovician (Darriwilian)	United Kingdom	
Cyclometra	Clark, AH	1911	C. flavescens Clark, 1911	Antedonidae	extant	Quaternary (Holocene)	Indian Ocean	
Cyclomischus	Moore & Jeffords	1968	C. shelbyensis Moore & Jeffords, 1968	[columnal]	extinct	Silurian (Niagaran)	United States	
Cyclomonile	Moore & Jeffords	1968	C. monile Moore & Jeffords, 1968	[columnal]	extinct	Ordovician (Katian)	United States, Russia	
Cycloocetocrinus	Dubatolova	1980	C. ruidus Dubatolova, 1980	[columnal]	extinct	Devonian	Russia, Poland	
Cyclopagoda	Moore & Jeffords	1968	C. alternata Moore & Jeffords, 1968	[columnal]	extinct	Ordovician (Katian)	United States, Russia, Estonia	
Cyclopentagonopa (nomen nudum)	Wright	1983	.	[columnal]	extinct	Ordovician (Katian)	United Kingdom	
Cyclopentastellatopa (nomen nudum)	Wright	1983	.	[columnal]	extinct	Ordovician (Katian)	United Kingdom	
Cycloscapus	Moore & Jeffords	1968	C. laevis Moore & Jeffords, 1968	[columnal]	extinct	Pennsylvanian (Desmoinesian)	United States	
Cyclostelechus	Moore & Jeffords	1968	C. turritus Moore & Jeffords, 1968	[columnal]	extinct	Mississippian (Viséan)	United States	
Cyclotristellatopa (nomen nudum)	Wright	1983	.	[columnal]	extinct	Ordovician (Katian)	United Kingdom	
Cydonocrinus	Bather	1913	C. parvulus Bather, 1913	Codiacrinidae	extinct	Mississippian - Permian	Canada, United Kingdom, Russia, Australia, Timor	
Cydrocrinus	Kirk	1940	Poteriocrinus coxanus Worthen, 1862	Rhenocrinidae	extinct	Mississippian (Viséan)	United States	
Cylicocrinus	Miller, SA	1892	C. canaliculatus Miller, 1892	Carpocrinidae	extinct	Silurian (Niagaran)	United States	
Cylindrocauliscus	Moore & Jeffords	1968	C. fiski Moore & Jeffords, 1968	[columnal]	extinct	Mississippian (Tournaisian) & Pennsylvanian (Desmoinesian & Westphalian)	United States, Poland	
Cyliocrinus	Jaekel	1918	Melocrinus rigidus Angelin, 1878	Metabolocrinidae	extinct	Silurian (Wenlockian)	Sweden	
Cyllometra	Clark, AH	1907	Antedon manca Carpenter, 1888	Colobometridae	extant	Quaternary (Holocene)	Japan to Sunda Islands & to Persian gulf	
Cymatocrinus	Dubatolova	1971	C. undulaticostatus Dubatolova, 1971	[columnal]	extinct	Devonian	Russia	
Cymbiocrinus	Kirk	1944	C. grandis Kirk, 1944	Ampelocrinidae	extinct	Mississippian (Viséan & Serpukhovian) * Pennsylvanian (Morrowan)	United States	
Cyphocrinus	Miller	1892	C. gorbyi Miller, 1892	Dimerocrinitidae	extinct	Mississippian (Viséan & Serpukhovian) * Pennsylvanian (Morrowan)	United States	
Cyphostelechus	Moore & Jeffords	1968	C. claudus Moore & Jeffords, 1968	[columnal]	extinct	Pennsylvanian (Desmoinesian)	United States	
Cyrtidocrinus (jun. syn. of Lecanocrinus)	Angelin	1878	C. facietatus Angelin, 1878					
Cyrtocrinus (jun. hom. of Cyrtocrinus Jaekel, 1892 - see Cytidocrinus)	Kirk	1943	Actinocrinus sculptus Hall, 1858					
Cystocrinus (incorrectly spelled Cysticrinus by Zittel, 1880)	Roemer	1830	C. tennesseensis Roemer, 1860	[columnal]	extinct	Silurian (Niagaran)	United States	
Cystoidosaccus	Faber	1929	C. fultoni Faber, 1929	[columnal]	extinct	Silurian (Llandoverian)	United States	
Cytidocrinus	Kirk	1944	Actinocrinus sculptus Hall, 1858	Actinocrinitidae	extinct	Mississippian (Viséan)	United States	
Cytocrinus	Roemer	1860	C. laevis Roemer, 1860	uncertain (Glyptocrinina)	extinct	Silurian (Niagaran)	United States	
Cyttarocrinus	Goldring	1923	Platycrinus eriensis Hall, 1862	Hapalocrinidae	extinct	Devonian (Emsian, Eifelian & Givetian)	United States, Germany, Morocco	
Dactylocrinus (jun. hom of Dactylorinus Quenstedt & jun. syn. of Scytalocrinus) (incorrectly spelled Dactilocrinus by Wachsmuth & Springer, 1886)	Sladen	1878	D. loreus Sladen, 1878					
Dactylocrinus	Quenstedt	1876	Dimerocrinites oligoptilus Pacht, 1862	Dactylocrinidae	extinct	Devonian & Mississippian (Tournaisian)	United States, Europe, Russia	
Dadocrinus	v Meyer	1847	Encrinus gracilis Buch, 1845	Dadocrinidae	extinct	Triassic (Anisian)	Europe	
Daedalocrinus	Ulrich	1925	D. kirki Ulrich, 1925	Homocrinidae	extinct	Ordovician (Sandbian)	Canada	
Daemonocrinites (jun. syn. of Talarocrinus) (incorrectly spelled Daemonicrinites by Miller, 1889 & Daemonocrinus by Bather,1900)	Troost	1850	D. cornutus Troost, 1850					
Daidalometra	Clark, AH	1916	Antedon hana Clark, 1907	Thalassometridae	extant	Quaternary (Holocene)	Japan, Timor, Australia	
Dalicrinus	Cole, et al.	2017	D. hammanni Cole, et al., 2017	Homocrinidae	extinct	Ordovician (Katian)	Spain	
Darraghcrinus	Jell	1999	D. tomi Jell, 1999	Calceocrinidae	extinct	Devonian (Lochkovian)	Australia	
Dasciocrinus	Kirk	1939	Cyathocrinus florialis Yandell & Shumard, 1847	Pirasocrinidae	extinct	Mississippian (Viséan & Serpukhovian)	United States	
Dastaricrinus	Stukalina	1986	D. digitatus Stukalina, 1986	[columnal]	extinct	Silurian	Russia, Kazakhstan	
Davidaster	Hoggett & Rowe	1986	Antedon rubiginosa Pourtalès, 1869	Comatulidae	extant	Quaternary (Holocene)	Central America	
Dashsbergcrinites (jun. syn. of Procupressocrinus)	Hauser	2007	D. rotundatus Hauser, 2007					
Dazhucrinus	Mu & Wu	1974	D. shanxiensis Mu & Wu, 1974	uncertain (Dendrocrinida)	extinct	Silurian	China	
Decacrinus	Yeltyschewa	1957	D. pennatus Yeltyschewa, 1957	[columnal]	extinct	Silurian & Devonian	Tajistan, Czech Republic, Kazakhstan, Uzbekistan, Russia, France	
Decadactylocrinites (jun. syn. of Heterocrinus) (incorrectly spelled Decadactlyocrinus by Wachsmuth & Springer, 1886)	Owen	1843	D. planus Owen, 1843					
Decadocrinus	Wachsmuth & Springer	1880	Poteriocrinus (Scaphiocrinus) scalaris Meek & Worthen, 1861	Decadocrinidae	extinct	Devonian, Mississippian & Pennsylvanian	North America, Europe, China	
Decalobatocrinus	Sisova	1991	D. laciniatus Sisova, 1991	[columnal]	extinct	Mississippian (Tournaisian)	Kazakhstan	
Decameros	d'Orbigny	1850	Decameros ricordeanus d'Orbigny, 1850	Decameridae	extinct	Cretaceous (Valanginian - Albian)	Europe	
Decametra	Clark, AH	1911	D. möbiusi Clark, 1911	Colobometridae	extant	Quaternary (Holocene)	East Africa to Australia & Japan	
Decametrocrinus (jun. syn. of Thaumatocrinus)	Minckert	1905	.					
Decapentacrinus	Sisova	1977	D. inceptus Sisova, 1977	[columnal]	extinct	Mississippian (Viséan & Serpukhovian)	Kazakhstan	
Decapetalus	Donovan	1995	D. beggi Donovan, 1995	[columnal]	extinct	Ordovician (Sandbian)	United Kingdom	
Decemicrinus	Stukalina	1980	D. decilobatus Stukalina, 1980	[columnal]	extinct	Ordovician (Katian)	Kazakhstan	
Decorocrinus	McIntosh	2001	Botryocrinus arkonensis Goldring, 1950	Rutkowskicrinidae	extinct	Devonian (Givetian)	North America	
Delgadocrinus	Ausich, Sá, & Gutiérrez-Marco	2007	D. oportovinum Ausich, Sá, & Gutiérrez-Marco, 2007	Delgadocrinidae	extinct	Ordovician (Darriwilian)	Portugal	
Delocrinus	Miller & Gurley	1890	D. subhemisphericus Moore & Plummer, 1940 (not Shumard, 1856)	Catacrinidae	extinct	Mississippian, Pennsylvanian & Permian	United States, China, Bolivia, Timor	
Deltacrinus	Ulrich	1886	Cheirocrinus clarus Hall, 1862	Calceocrinidae	extinct	Devonian (Givetian & Famennian)	United States, China	
Democrinus	Perrier	1883	Democrinus parfaiti Perrier, 1883	Rhizocrinidae	extant	Cretaceous (Maastrichtian) to Quaternary (Holocene)	worldwide	
Denarioacrocrinus	Webster & Jell, 1999	1999	D. neerkolensis Webster & Jell, 1999	Acrocrinidae	extinct	Pennsylvanian (Bashkirian & Westphalian)	Australia, Argentina	
Denariocrinus	Schmidt	1942	D. ferula Schmidt, 1942	Poteriocrinitidae	extinct	Devonian (Esmian)	Germany	
Dendrocrinus	Hall	1852	D. longidactylus Hall, 1852	Dendrocrinidae	extinct	Ordovician, Silurian & Devonian	North America, Europe, Australia, Russia, United Kingdom	
Denticrinus	Klikushin	1985	.	.	extinct	Paleogene (Paleocene)	.	
Dentiferocrinus	Stukalina	1968	Pentagonopentagonalis dentiferus Yeltsychewa, 1955	[columnal]	extinct	Ordovician & Silurian	Kazakhstan, Uzbekikstan, Tajistan, Russia, North America	
Deocrinus	Hudson	1907	Rhodocrinus asperatus Billings, 1859	Anthracocrinidae	extinct	Ordovician, (Darriwilian)	Canada	
Depaocrinus	Wanner	1937	D. ottowi Wanner, 1937	Pachylocrinidae?	extinct	Permian	Timor	
Derbiocrinus (incorrectly spelled Derbyiocrinus by Lane & Sevastopulo,1990)	Wright	1951	D. diversus Wright, 1951	Hydreionocrinidae	extinct	Mississippian (Viséan)	United Kingdom	
Derorhethocrinus	Webster et al.	2003	D. elongatus Webster et al., 2003	Amabilicrinidae	extinct	Mississippian (Tournaisian)	Iran	
Desidiamphidia	Moore & Jeffords	1968	D. frondea Moore and Jeffords, 1968	[columnal]	extinct	Devonian (Givetian)	United States, France	
Desmacriocrinus	Strimple	1966	Kallimorphocrinus weldenensis Strimple & Koenig, 1956	Allagecrinidae	extinct	Mississippian (Tournaisian) & Pennsylvanian (Bashkirian)	United States, Iran	
Desmidocrinus	Angelin	1878	D. pentadactylus Angelin, 1878	Carpocrinidae	extinct	Silurian (Wenlockian, Niagaran & Ludlovian)	United States, Sweden, United Kingdom	
Diabolocrinus	Wachsmuth & Springer	1897	D. perplexus Wachsmuth & Springer, 1897	Rhodocrinitidae	extinct	Ordovician (Sandbian & Katian)	United States	
Dialutocrinus	Wright	1955	D. milleri Wright, 1955	Actinocrinitidae	extinct	Mississippian (Tournaisian)	Europe, United Kingdom, Australia	
Diamenocrinus	Oehlert	1891	D. jouani Oehlert, 1891	Rhodocrinitidae	extinct	Devonian (Pragian & Emsian)	Europe	
Dianthicoeloma	Moore & Jeffords	1968	D. insuetum Moore and Jeffords, 1968	[columnal]	extinct	Ordovician	United States, Russia, Estonia, Yugoslavia	
Diaphorocrinus	Eckert	1984	D. pleniramulus Eckert, 1984	Calceocrinidae	extinct	Silurian (Llandeilian)	Canada	
Diatorocrinus (jun. syn. of Actinocrinites)	Wright	1955	D. angustus Wright, 1955					
Dibrachiocrinus (jun. syn. of Hemibrachiocrinus)	Arendt	1968	.					
Dichocrinus (incorrectly spelled Dichocrinites by Geinitz, 1846)	Münster	1839	D. radiatus Münster, 1839	Dichocrinidae	extinct	Mississippian, Pennsylvanian & Permian	Europe, Russia, Algeria, North America, Australia	
Dichostreblocrinus	Weller	1930	D. scrobiculus Weller, 1930	Streblocrinidae	extinct	Mississippian, Pennsylvanian & Permian	United States, Timor	
Dichrometra	Clark, AH	1909	Alecto flagellata Müller, 1841	Mariametridae	extant	Quaternary (Holocene)	Indian Ocean, western Pacific	
Dicirrocrinus	Schmidt	1934	D. comtus Schmidt, 1934	uncertain (Inadunata)	extinct	Devonian (Emsian & Eifelian)	Germany	
Dicromyocrinus	Jaekel	1918	Cromyocrinus ornatus Trautschold, 1867 (part)	Cromyocrinidae	extinct	Mississippian & Pennsylvanian	United States, Algeria	
Dictenocrinus	Jaekel	1918	Botryocrinus decadactylus Bather, 1891	Mastigocrinidae	extinct	Silurian & Devonian	Europe, Australia	
Dierocalipter	Moore & Jeffords	1968	D. doter Moore and Jeffords, 1968	[columnal]	extinct	Mississippian (Tournaisian & Viséan)	United States, Kazakhstan	
Dieuryocrinus	Wright	1954	Euryocrinus duplex Wright, 1942	Euryocrinidae	extinct	Silurian & Devonian	Europe, Australia	
Difficilicrinus	Frest, Strimple & McGinnis	1979	D. coneyi Frest, Strimple & McGinnis, 1979	Homocrinidae	extinct	Ordovician (Sandbian)	United States	
Digiticrinus	Stukalina	1980	D. digitatus Stukalina, 1980	[columnal]	extinct	Ordovician (Darriwilian, Sandbian & Katian)	Kazakhstan, Thailand	
Dilanteris	Moore & Jeffords	1968	D. trestes Moore and Jeffords, 1968	[columnal]	extinct	Mississippian (Viséan)	United States	
Dilatocrinus	Webster & Lane	1987	Amphoracrinus multiramosus Meek & Worthen, 1866	Amphoracrinidae	extinct	Ordovician (Sandbian)	United States	
Dimerocrinites (incorrectly spelled Dimerocrinus by Müller, 1843)	Phillips in Murchison	1839	D. decadactylus Phillips in Murchison, 1839	Dimerocrinitidae	extinct	Silurian & Devonian	North America, Europe, Australia	
Dimerocrinites (jun. syn. of Dactylocrinus)	Pacht	1852	Dimerocrinites oligoptilus Pacht, 1852					
Dimorphicrinus	d'Orbigny	1849	Platycrinites pentangularis Miller, 18	uncertain (Inadunata)	extinct	Mississippian (Tournaisian)	United Kingdom	
Dinacrocrinus	Moore & Strimple	1969	Acrocrinus expansus Strimple, 1951	Acrocrinidae	extinct	Mississippian (Tournaisian)	United Kingdom	
Dinardocrinus	Manni & Nicosia	1990	D. tiburtinus Manni & Nicosia, 1987	Eudesicrinidae	extinct	Jurassic (Tourcian)	Italy	
Dinocrinus (jun. syn. of Calceolispongia)	Wanner	1916	D. cornutus Wanner, 1916					
Dinotocrinus	Kirk	1941	D. compactus Kirk, 1941	Staphylocrinidae	extinct	Mississippian (Viséan & Serpukhovian)	North America	
Diodontometra (jun. syn. of Chlorometra) Diodontometra, 1922; Charitometridae AH Clark, 1909; AH Clark, 1909 (synonym)	Gislén	1922	D. bocki Gislén, 1922					
Dipentagonocrinus	Arendt	2002	D. magnocarinatus Arendt, 2002	[columnal]	extinct	Mississippian (Serpukhovian)	Russia	
Diphuicrinus	Moore & Plummer	1938	D. compactus Kirk, 1941	Staphylocrinidae	extinct	Mississippian (Viséan & Serpukhovian)	North America	
Diplocrinus (jun. syn. of Endoxocrinus)	Döderlein	1912	Pentacrinus maclearanus Thomson, 1872					
Discocrinus	Peck	1943	D. catastomus Peck, 1943	Roveacrinidae	extinct	Cretaceous (Albian & Cenomanian)	United States	
Discolocrinus Discolocrinus, 2008; Bather, 1899	Mironov	2008	D. thieli Mironov, 2008	Bathycrinidae	extant	Quaternary (Holocene)	eastern Pacific	
Discometra	Gislén	1924	Antedon eggenburgensis Schaffer, 1912	Palaeantedonidae	extinct	Neogene (Miocene)	Germany	
Disconia (jun. syn. of Carabocrinus)	Westphal	1974	D. pentamerus Westphal, 1974					
Displodocrinus	Webster & Lane	1987	Actinocrinus divergens Hall, 1859	Amphoracrinidae	extinct	Mississippian (Viséan)	United States	
Distinctocrinus	Milicina	2001	D. primitivus Milicina, 2001	[columnal]	extinct	Silurian (Wenlockian)	Russia	
Dittlerocrinus	Grygar & Vasicek	1983	D. gracilis Grygar & Vasicek, 1983	[columnal]	extinct	Pennsylvanian (Namurian)	Czech Republic	
Divisicrinus	Stukalina	1980	D. divisus Stukalina, 1980	[columnal]	extinct	Ordovician (Darriwilian)	Kazakhstan	
Dizygocrinus	Wachsmuth & Springer	1897	Actinocrinus indianaensis Lyon and Casseday, 1860	Batocrinidae	extinct	Mississippian (Tournaisian, Viséan, Serpukhovian)	United States	
Dolatocrinus	Lyon	1857	D. lacus Lyon, 1857	Dolatocrinidae	extinct	Devonian	North America, Australia	
Dolerocrinus (jun. syn. of Eohalysiocrinus)	Prick	1983	D. fritschi Prick, 1983					
Dolichocrinus	Loriol	1891	Eugeniacrinus aberrans Loriol, 1882	Bathycrinidae	extinct	Jurassic (Bajocian - Tithonian)	Portugal	
Doliocrinus	Warn	1982	D. pustulatus Warn, 1982	Cincinnaticrinidae	extinct	Ordovician (Sandbian)	United States	
Doliolocrinites (jun. syn. of Talarocrinus) (incorrectly spelled Doliocrinites by Shumard, 1866 & Doliolocrinus by Wachsmuth & Springer, 1881)	Hall	1858	D. ovalis Troost					
Donacicrinites (jun. syn. of Synbathocrinus) (incorrectly spelled Donacicrinus by Bather, 1900)	Troost	1850	D. simplex Troost, 1850					
Dorashamicrinus	Stukalina	1999	D. vulgaris Stukalina, 1999	[columnal]	extinct	Permian (Dzhulfian)	Russia	
Doreckicrinus	Rasmussen	1961	Pentacrinus miliaris Nielsen, 1913	Isocrinidae	extinct	Cretaceous (Campanian) to Paleogene (Danian)	Europe	
Dorometra	Clark, AH	1917	Antedon nana Hartlaub, 1890	Antedonidae	extant	Quaternary (Holocene)	Indian Ocean & Western Pacific	
Dorycrinus	Roemer	1854	D. mississippiensis Roemer, 1854	Coelocrinidae	extinct	Mississippian (Tournaisian & Viséan)	United States	
Dracrinus	Webster & Becker	2009	D. crenulatus Webster & Becker, 2009	Dendrocrinidae	extinct	Devonian (Emsian)	Morocco	
Dronovictinus	Stukalina	1997	D. notabilis Stukalina, 1997	[columnal]	extinct	Devonian/Mississippian boundary (Famennian/Tournaisian)	Afghanistan, Poland	
Drymocrinus	Ulrich	1925	Heterocrinus geniculatus Ulrich, 1879	Homocrinidae	extinct	Ordovician (Katian)	North America	
Dulanocrinus	Stukalina & Tuyutyan	1970	D. ulkuntasensis Stukalina & Tujutjan, 1970	[columnal]	extinct	Ordovician (Katian)	Kazakhstan	
Dumetocrinus	Mironov & Sorokina	1998	Ptilocrinus antarcticus Bather, 1908	Hyocrinidae	extant	Quaternary (Holocene)	Antarctic	
Duncanicrinus	Jell	1999	D. calvariolus Jell, 1999	Dimerocrinitidae	extinct	Devonian (Lochkovian)	Australia	
Dunnicrinus	Moore	1967	D. mississippiensis Moore, 1967	Bourgueticrinidae	extinct	Cretaceous (Maastrichtian)	United States	
Dwortsowaecrinus	Stukalina	1967	Tetragonotetragonalis quadrihamatus Yeltyschewa, 1963	[columnal]	extinct	Ordovician & Silurian	Kazakhstan, Estonia, Russia	
Dynamocrinus	Eckert & Brett	2001	D. robustus Eckert & Brett, 2001	Paramelocrinidae	extinct	Silurian (Llandoverian)	United States	
Dystactocrinus (incorrectly spelled Distactocrinus by Lane, 1984)	Ulrich	1925	Heterocrinus (Homocrinus) constrictus Hall, 1871	Cincinnaticrinidae	extinct	Ordovician (Katian)	United States	
Echmatocrinus	Sprinkle	1973	E. brachiatus Sprinkle, 1973	Echmatocrinidae	extinct	Cambrian	Canada	
Eckicrinus	Hagdorn & Gluchowski	1993	Encrinus radiatus Schauroth, 1859	Holocrinidae	extinct	Triassic (Anisian)	Europe, China	
Eckidocrinus	Jell & Theron	1999	E. interbrachiatus Jell & Theron, 1999	Dendrocrinidae	extinct	Devonian (Eifelian)	South Africa	
Ectenocrinus	Miller	1889	Heterocrinus simplex Hall, 1847	Homocrinidae	extinct	Ordovician (Sandbian & Katian)	North America	
Ectocrinus	Wright	1955	Actinocrinus olla M'Coy, 1849	Amphoracrinidae	extinct	Mississippian (Tournaisian, Viséan & Serpukhovian)	China, United Kingdom, Ireland, Algeria	
Edapocrinus (incorrectly spelled Edaphocrinus by Wanner, 1937)	Wright	1935	E. rugosus Wright, 1935	Codiacrinidae	extinct	Mississippian (Viséan)	United Kingdom	
Edriocrinus	Hall	1859	E. pocilliformis Hall, 1859	Edriocrinidae	extinct	Mississippian (Viséan)	United Kingdom	
Edwardsocrinus (jun. syn. of Platycrinites) (incorrectly spelled Edwarsocrinus by d'Orbigny, 1849)	d'Orbigny	1849	Platycrinites ornatus M'Coy, 1844					
Eguasarowicrinus	Schewtschenko	1971	Pentagonocyclicus egiasarowi Yeltyschewa, 1960.	[columnal]	extinct	Silurian (Llandoverian & Wenlockian)	Russia	
Eidosocrinus	Webster & Jell	1999	E. condaminensis Webster & Jell, 1999	Decadocrinidae	extinct	Mississippian (Viséan)	United Kingdom	
Eifelocrinus	Wanner	1916	Ptilocrinus dohmi Wanner, 1916	Thalamocrinidae	extinct	Devonian (Emsian & Eifelian)	Germany, Spain	
Eireocrinus (jun. syn. of Holcocrinus)	Wright	1951	E. ornatus Wright, 1951					
Eirmocrinus	Strimple & Watkins	1969	E. grossus Strimple & Watkins, 1969	Pirasocrinidae	extinct	Pennsylvanian (Desmoinesian)	United States	
Eknomocrinus	Guensburg & Sprinkle	2003	E. wahwahensis Guensburg & Sprinkle, 2003	Eknomocrinidae	extinct	Ordovician (Tremadocian)	United States	
Ekteinocrinus	Webster & Lane	2007	E. battleshipensis Webster & Lane, 2007	Bridgerocrinidae	extinct	Permian (Atrinskian)	United States	
Elaeacrinidarum	Peetz	1916	E. miljukovi Peetz, 1916	uncertain	extinct	Mississippian	Russia	
Elassocrinus	Webster & Lane	2007	Aesiocrinus delicatulus Lane & Webster, 1966	Aesiocrinidae	extinct	Permian (Artinskian)	United States	
Elegantocrinus	Ausich & Kammer	2009	Platycrinus hemisphaericus Meek & Worthen, 1865	Platycrinitidae	extinct	Mississippian (Tournaisian & Viséan)	United States, Belgium, United Kingdom, Ireland	
Elibatocrinus	Moore	1940	E. leptocalyx Moore, 1940	Blothrocrinidae	extinct	Pennsylvanian & Permian	United States	
Elicrinus (jun. syn. of Codiacrinus) (incorrectly spelled Eliocrinus by Hauser, 2003)	Prokop	1973	E. procerus Prokop, 1973					
Ellipsocrinus	Prokop & Slámová	2009	E. hanusi Prokop & Slámová, 2009	[columnal]	extinct	Devonian (Emsian)	Czech Republic	
Elpasocrinus	Sprinkle & Wahlman	1994	E. radiatus Sprinkle & Wahlman, 1994	Dendrocrinidae	extinct	Ordovician (Floian)	United States	
Elpidocrinus	Strimple	1963	E. tholiformis Strimple, 1963	Elpidocrinidae	extinct	Silurian (Ludlovian)	United States	
Elytroclon	Moore & Jeffords	1968	E. elimatus Moore & Jeffords, 1968	[columnal]	extinct	Mississippian (Viséan)	United States	
Embolocrinus	Webster & Becker	2009	E. quadruus Webster & Becker, 2009	?Ambalicrinidae	extinct	Devonian (Frasnian)	Morocco	
Embryocrinus	Wanner	1916	E. hanieli Wanner, 1916	Codiacrinidae	extinct	Permian	Russia, Tunisia, Timor	
Embryocrinus (jun. syn. of Dendrocrinus)	Hudson (non Wanner, 1916)	1918	E. problematicus Hudson, 1918					
Embryometra	Gislén	1938	E. mortenseni Gislén, 1938	Colobometridae	extant	Quaternary (Holocene)	South Africa	
Emperocrinus	Miller & Gurley	1895	E. indianensis Miller & Gurley, 1895	Emperocrinidae	extinct	Silurian (Wenlockian)	United States	
Enallocrinus	d'Orbigny	1849	Apiocrinites scriptus Hisinger, 1828	Crotalocrinitidae	extinct	Silurian (Wenlockian)	Sweden, United Kingdom	
Enascocrinus	Strimple & Watkins	1969	Talanterocrinus redsdalensis Wright, 1952	Synerocrinidae	extinct	Mississippian (Viséan)	United Kingdom	
Encrinus	Lamarck	1801	E. liliiformis Lamarck, 1801	Encrinidae	extinct	Triassic (Anisian, Ladinian, Carnian)	Europe & Asia	
Endelocrinus	Moore & Plummer	1940	Eupachycrinus fayettensis Worthen, 1873	Catacrinidae	extinct	Pennsylvanian & Permian	United States, Bolivia	
Endoxocrinus	Clark, AH	1908	Encrinus parrae Gervais, 1835	Isselicrinidae	extant	Quaternary (Holocene)	Atlantic	
Eocamptocrinus	Gluchowski	1980	E. fragilis Gluchowski, 1980	[columnal]	extinct	Devonian (Eifelian & Givetian)	Poland	
Eocicerocrinus	Donovan	1989	E. sevastopuloi Donovan, 1989	Pisocrinidae	extinct	Ordovician (Katian)	United Kingdom	
Eocomatula	Simms	1988	.	Eocomatulidae	extinct	Triassic (Rhaetian) & Jurassic (Pliensbachian)	Europe, South America	
Eodimerocrinites	Donovan & Gilmour	2003	E. littlewoodi Donovan, 2003	Dimerocrinitidae	extinct	Ordovician (Katian)	United Kingdom	
Eodolatocrinus	Clement & Brett	2015	E. blabsei Clement & Brett, 2015	Parapatelliocrinidae	extinct	Devonian (Lochkovian)	United States	
Eohalysiocrinus	Prokop	1970	E. convexus Prokop, 1970	Calceocrinidae	extinct	Silurian (Niagaran) & Devonian (Pragian, Emsian, Eifelian)	United States, France, Czech Republic, Germany	
Eoindocrinus	Arendt	1981	E. praerimosus Arendt, 1981	Indocrinidae	extinct	Permian (Artinskian)	Russia, Australia	
Eometra	Clark, AH	1936	Psathyrometra antarctica Clark, 1915	Antedonidae	extant	Quaternary (Holocene)	Antarctic	
Eomyelodactylus	Foerste	1919	Myelodactylus (Eomyelodactylus) rotundatus Foerste, 1919	Myelodactylidae	extinct	Silurian (Llandoverian & Niagaran)	North America	
Eoparisocrinus	Ausich	1986	Parisocrinus siluricus Springer, 1926	Euspirocrinidae	extinct	Silurian (Llandoverian & Niagaran)	North America	
Eopatelliocrinus	Brower	1973	E. scyphogracilis Brower, 1973	Patelliocrinidae	extinct	Ordovician (Katian & Hirnantian)	United States	
Eopetalocrinus	Li	1993	E. sinensis Li, 1993	Petalocrinidae	extinct	Ordovician (Darriwilian)	China	
Eopilidiocrinus	Arendt	1981	Pilidiocrinus heckeri Arendt, 1970	Pilidiocrinidae	extinct	Permian (Artinskian)	Russia	
Eopinnacrinus	Brower & Veinus	1982	E. pinnulatus Brower & Veinus, 1982	Metabolocrinidae	extinct	Ordovician (Sandbian)	United States	
Eopactocrinus (jun. syn. of Gasterocoma)	Müller	1855	E. irregularis Wirtgen & Zeiler, 1855					
Epalxyocrinus (nomen nudum)	Sisova	1960	E. asymmetricus Sisova, 1960	[columnal]	extinct	Mississippian (Viséan & Namurian)	Russia	
Epiacrocrinus	Arendt	1995	E. crassus Arendt, 1995	Acrocrinidae	extinct	Pennsylvanian (Moscovian & Kassimovian)	Russia	
Epihalysiocrinus	Arendt	1965	Halysiocrinus tuberculatus Yakovlev, 1927	Calceocrinidae	extinct	Pennsylvanian (Bashkirian) & Permian (Artinskian)	Russia	
Epimetra	Clark, AH	1911	E. nympha Clark, 1911	Colobometridae	extant	Quaternary (Holocene)	Philippines	
Epipetschoracrinus	Yakovlev	1956	E. borealis Yakovlev, 1956	Agassizocrinidae	extinct	Permian	Russia	
Eratocrinus	Kirk	1938	Zeacrinus elegans Hall, 1858	Zeacrinitidae	extinct	Mississippian (Tournaisian & Viséan)	United States	
Eretmocrinus	Lyon & Casseday	1859	E. magnificus Lyon & Casseday, 1859	Batocrinidae	extinct	Mississippian & Pennsylvanian	North America	
Erincrinus	Ausich & Sevastopulo	2001	Graphiocrinus austini Wright, 1952	Bursacrinidae	extinct	Mississippian (Tournaisian)	Ireland	
Erisocrinus	Meek & Worthen	1865	E. typus Meek & Worthen, 1865	Erisocrinidae	extinct	Mississippian, Pennsylvanian & Permian	United States, Russia, United Kingdom, China, Brazil, Japan, Sicily	
Erlangeracrocrinus	Arendt	1995	E. elongatus Arendt, 1995	Acrocrinidae	extinct	Pennsylvanian (Moscovian)	Russia	
Erythrometra	Clark, AH	1908	Antedon ruber Clark, 1907	Antedonidae	extant	Quaternary (Holocene)	Japan, Indonesia, New Zealand	
Espanocrinus	Webster	1976	E. lemonei Webster, 1976	Calceocrinidae	extinct	Devonian (Emsian)	Spain	
Esthonocrinus	Jaekel	1918	E. laevior Jaekel, 1918	Dendrocrinidae	extinct	Ordovician (Sandbian)	Estonia	
Ethelocrinus	Kirk	1937	Eupachycrinus magister Miller & Gurley, 1890	Cromyocrinidae	extinct	Mississippian & Pennsylvanian	United States	
Eucalyptocrinites	Goldfuss	1831	Eucalyptocrinites rosaceus Goldfuss, 1831	Eucalyptocrinitidae	extinct	Silurian to Middle Devonian	Asia, Australia, Europe, North America	
Eucatillocrinus								
Eucladocrinus								
Eudesicrinus								
Eudimerocrinus								
Euerisocrinus								
Eugeniacrinites								
Eumorphocrinus								
Euonychocrinus								
Eupachycrinus								
Euptychocrinus								
Euryocrinus								
Euspirocrinus								
Eustenocrinus								
Eutaxocrinus								
Eutelecrinus								
Eutrochocrinus								
Exaetocrinus								
Exochocrinus								
Exocrinus								
Exoriocrinus								
Exsulacrinus								
Exterocrinus								
Fifeocrinus								
Fishericrinus								
Follicrinus								
Forbesiocrinus								
Forthocrinus								
Galateacrinus								
Gammarocrinites								
Gasterocoma								
Gastrocrinus								
Gaulocrinus								
Gaurocrinus								
Gazacrinus								
Gemmacrinus								
Gennaeocrinus								
Geraocrinus								
Geroldicrinus								
Gilbertsocrinus								
Gilmocrinus								
Gissocrinus								
Glaphyocrinus								
Glaucocrinus								
Glaukosocrinus								
Glenotremites								
Globacrocrinus								
Globocrinus								
Glossocrinus								
Glyptocrinus								
Gnorimocrinus								
Goleocrinus								
Gongrocrinus								
Goniocrinus								
Gothocrinus								
Graffhamicrinus								
Graphiocrinus								
Grenprisia								
Griphocrinus								
Grypocrinus								
Guettardicrinus								
Gustabilicrinus								
Gutticrinus								
Gymnocrinus								
Hadrocrinus								
Haereticotaxocrinus								
Haeretocrinus								
Hagnocrinus								
Hallocrinus								
Halogetocrinus								
Halysiocrinus								
Hapalocrinus								
Haplocrinites								
Harmostocrinus								
Harrelicrinus								
Harrellicrinus								
Hebeticrinus								
Helicocrinus								
Heliosocrinus								
Hemibrachiocrinus								
Hemicrinus								
Hemiindocrinus								
Hemimollocrinus								
Hemistreptacron								
Hemistreptocrinus								
Heracrinus								
Hercocrinus								
Herpetocrinus								
Hertha								
Heterocrinus								
Heterometra								
Hexacrinites								
Himerocrinus								
Himerometra								
Hirneacrinus								
Hispidocrinus								
Histocrinus								
Holcocrinus								
Holocrinus	Wachsmuth & Springer	1887	Encrinus beyrichi Picard, 1883	Holocrinidae	extinct	Triassic (Induan - Carnian)	Japan, Europe, North America, China, New Zealand	
Holopus								
Holynocrinus								
Homalocrinus								
Homocrinus								
Hoplocrinus								
Hormocrinus								
Hosieocrinus								
Hoyacrinus								
Hyalocrinus								
Hybocrinus								
Hybocystites								
Hydreionocrinus								
Hydriocrinus								
Hydroporocrinus								
Hylodecrinus								
Hypocrinus								
Hypselocrinus								
Hypsocrinus								
Hyrtanecrinus								
Ibanocrinus								
Iberocrinus								
Ibexocrinus								
Icthyocrinus								
Idaeumocrinus								
Idosocrinus								
Illemnocrinus								
Ilmocrinus								
Imitatocrinus								
Indocrinus								
Intermediacrinus								
Inyocrinus								
Iocrinus								
Isocatillocrinus								
Isocrinus								
Isotomocrinus								
Isselicrinus								
Iteacrinus								
Ivanovaecrinus								
Jaekelicrinus								
Jaekelometra								
Jahnocrinus								
Jimbacrinus								
Junocrinus								
Kallimorphocrinus								
Kalpidocrinus								
Kanabinocrinus								
Kansacrinus								
Katarocrinus								
Kooptoonocrinus								
Kopficrinus								
Kophinocrinus								
Krinocrinus								
Kylixocrinus								
Kyreocrinus								
Labiocrinus								
Laccocrinus								
Laevigatocrinus								
Lageniocrinus								
Lampadosocrinus								
Lampterocrinus								
Lanecrinus								
Lanternocrinus								
Lasanocrinus								
Lasiocrinus								
Laubeocrinus								
Laudonocrinus								
Laurelocrinus								
Lebetocrinus								
Lecanocrinus								
Lecobasicrinus								
Lecocrinus								
Lecythiocrinus								
Lecythocrinus								
Lekocrinus								
Lemennocrinus								
Lenneocrinus								
Leocrinus								
Liliocrinus								
Linobrachiocrinus								
Linocrinus								
Liomolgocrinus								
Liparocrinus								
Lithocrinus								
Litocrinus								
Lobalocrinus								
Lobomelocrinus								
Logocrinus								
Lonchocrinus								
Lopadiocrinus								
Lophocrinus								
Loriolicrinus								
Loriolometra								
Lotocrinus								
Loxocrinus								
Luxocrinus								
Lyonicrinus								
Lyriocrinus								
Macarocrinus								
Macnamaratylus								
Macrocrinus								
Macrostylocrinus								
Maennilicrinus								
Malaiocrinus								
Maligneocrinus								
Manicrinus								
Manillocrinus								
Manticrinus								
Mantikosocrinus								
Maquoketocrinus								
Maragnicrinus								
Marathonocrinus								
Margocrinus								
Marhoumacrinus								
Marsupiocrinus								
Marsupites								
Mastigocrinus								
Mathericrinus								
Megaliocrinus								
Meganotocrinus								
Megistocrinus								
Melbacrinus								
Melocrinites								
Menniscocrinus								
Meristocrinus								
Merocrinus								
Mespilocrinus								
Metabolocrinus								
Metacatillocrinus								
Metacrinus								
Metacrocrinus								
Metacromyocrinus								
Metaeutelecrinus								
Metaffinocrinus								
Metaindocrinus								
Metallagecrinus								
Metaperimestocrinus								
Metasycocrinus								
Methabocrinus								
Metichthyocrinus								
Metutharocrinus								
Miatschkovocrinus								
Microcaracrinus								
Microcrinus								
Mictocrinus								
Millericrinus								
Minicrinus								
Minilyacrinus								
Miracrinus								
Mitrocrinus								
Moapocrinus								
Moenocrinus	Hildebrand	1926	Moenocrinus deeckei Hildebrand, 1926	Holocrinidae	extinct	Triassic (Anisian)	Germany	
Mollocrinus								
Monachocrinus								
Moniellocrinus								
Monobrachiocrinus								
Monstrocrinus								
Mooreocrinus								
Morrowcrinus								
Moscovicrinus								
Moundocrinus								
Musicrinus								
Mycocrinus								
Myelodactylus								
Myrtillocrinus								
Mysticocrinus								
Nacocrinus								
Nactocrinus								
Nanicrinus								
Nanocrinus								
Nassoviocrinus								
Nasutocrinus								
Nebrashacrinus								
Nemaster								
Neoarchaeocrinus								
Neocamtocrinus								
Neocatacrinus								
Neocatillocrinus								
Neocrinus								
Neodadocrinus								
Neodichocrinus								
Neolageniocrinus								
Neoplatycrinus								
Neoprotencrinus								
Neozeacrinus								
Nereocrinus								
Nevadacrinus								
Nevadocrinus								
Nexocrinus								
Nielsenicrinus								
Ninocrinus								
Nipterocrinus								
Nonparactocrinus								
Notiocatillocrinus								
Notiocrinus								
Notocrinus								
Nowracrinus								
Nummicrinus								
Nunnacrinus								
Nuxocrinus								
Nyctocrinus								
Occiducrinus								
Oehlerticrinus								
Oenochoacrinus								
Ohiocrinus								
Oklahomacrinus								
Oligobrachyocrinus								
Ontariocrinus								
Onychocrinus								
Ophiocrinus								
Ophiurocrinus								
Opsiocrinus								
Orbignycrinus								
Orthocrinus								
Orthogonocrinus								
Ossicrinus								
Osteocrinus								
Othneiocrinus								
Ottawacrinus								
Oxynocrinus								
Pabianocrinus								
Pachylocrinus								
Pachyocrinus								
Pagecrinus								
Paianocrinus								
Paiderocrinus								
Palaeantedon								
Palaeocomaster								
Palaeocrinus								
Palaeoholopus								
Palmerocrinus								
Pandanocrinus								
Pandoracrinus								
Parabotryocrinus								
Parabursacrinus								
Paracatillocrinus								
Paraclidochirus								
Paracolocrinus								
Paracomatula								
Paracosmetocrinus								
Paracotylederma								
Paracremacrinus								
Paracrocrinus								
Paracromyocrinus								
Paractocrinus								
Paracydonocrinus								
Paracymbiocrinus								
Paradelocrinus								
Paradiabolocrinus								
Paradichocrinus								
Paradoxocrinus								
Paragammarocrinites								
Paragaricocrinus								
Paragassizocrinus								
Paragazacrinus								
Paragraphiocrinus								
Parahexacrinus								
Paramegaliocrinus								
Paramelocrinus								
Paramphicrinus								
Paranisocrinus								
Parapernerocrinus								
Parapisocrinus								
Paraplasocrinus								
Pararchaeocrinus								
Parascytalocrinus								
Parastachyocrinus								
Parastephanocrinus								
Parasycocrinus								
Paratalarocrinus								
Paratimorocidaris								
Parazeacrinites								
Parazophocrinus								
Parethelocrinus								
Parichthyocrinus								
Parindocrinus								
Pariocrinus								
Parisangulocrinus								
Parisocrinus								
Parorthocrinus								
Parspaniocrinus								
Parulocrinus								
Passalocrinus								
Patelliocrinus								
Paulocrinus								
Pedinocrinus								
Pegocrinus								
Pelecocrinus								
Pelidocrinus								
Pellecrinus								
Peltacrinus								
Penicillicrinus								
Peniculocrinus								
Pentacrinites								
Pentaramicrinus								
Pentececrinus								
Pepitaxoncrinus								
Percevalicrinus								
Peremocrinus								
Periechocrinus								
Periglyptocrinus								
Perimestocrinus								
Perissocrinus								
Permiocrinus								
Permobrachypus								
Pernerocrinus								
Perritocrinus								
Perunocrinus								
Petalambicrinus								
Petalocrinus								
Petrocrinus								
Petschoracrinus								
Phacelocrinus								
Phanocrinus								
Phillipsocrinus								
Phimocrinus								
Phrygilocrinus								
Phyllocrinus								
Physetocrinus								
Pidelocrinus								
Pilidiocrinus								
Pilocrinus								
Pimlicocrinus								
Pirasocrinus								
Pisocrinus								
Pithocrinus								
Placometra								
Plagiocrinus								
Planacrocrinus								
Platyacrocrinus								
Platycrinites								
Platyfundocrinus								
Platyhexacrinus								
Plaxocrinus								
Plemnocrinus								
Plesiocrinus								
Pleurocrinus								
Plicatocrinus								
Plicodendrocrinus								
Plotocrinus								
Plummericrinus								
Poculicrinus								
Poecilocrinus								
Pogonipocrinus								
Polusocrinus								
Polycrinus								
Polygonocrinus								
Polypeltes								
Pomatocrinus								
Porocrinus								
Porphyrocrinus								
Poteriocrinites								
Pradocrinus								
Praecupulocrinus								
Praedicticrinus								
Praeisselicrinus								
Praeorocrinus								
Pregazacrinus								
Premanicrinus								
Prininocrinus								
Proallosocrinus								
Proampelocrinus								
Proanisocrinus								
Proapsidocrinus								
Probletocrinus								
Prochoidiocrinus								
Procomaster								
Proctothylacocrinus								
Proexenocrinus								
Prohexacrinus								
Proholopus								
Proindocrinus								
Prokopicrinus								
Prolobocrinus								
Promelocrinus								
Prophyllocrinus								
Propoteriocrinus								
Protacrocrinus								
Protaxocrinus								
Protencrinus								
Psalidocrinus								
Pseudoantedon								
Pseudosaccocoma								
Psilocrinus								
Pskovicrinus								
Pterinocrinus								
Pterocoma								
Pterotocrinus								
Ptychocrinus								
Pulaskicrinus								
Pumilindocrinus								
Putilovocrinus								
Pycnocrinus								
Pycnosaccus								
Pygmaeocrinus								
Pyndaxocrinus								
Pyrenocrinus								
Pyxidocrinus								
Quantoxocrinus								
Quenstedticrinus								
Quiniocrinus								
Quinquecaudex								
Ramacrinus								
Ramseyocrinus								
Ramulocrinus								
Rasfacrinus								
Raymondicrinus								
Regnellicrinus								
Remesimetra								
Remisovicrinus								
Resetocrinus								
Reteocrinus								
Retusocrinus								
Revalocrinus								
Rhabdocrinus								
Rhachkicrinus								
Rhadinocrinus								
Rhaphaocrinus								
Rhenocrinus								
Rheocrinus								
Rhipidocrinus								
Rhodanometra								
Rhodocrinites								
Rhopalocrinus								
Rhopocrinus								
Rimosidocrinus								
Ristnacrinus								
Roemerocrinus								
Roiometra								
Roveacrinoides								
Roveacrinus								
Rumphiocrinus								
Sacariacrinus								
Saccocoma								
Saccosompsis								
Sagenocrinites								
Sampsonocrinus								
Sardinocrinus								
Sarocrinus								
Scammatocrinus								
Schedexocrinus								
Schistocrinus								
Schizocrinus								
Schlueterometra								
Schmidtocrinus								
Schultzicrinus								
Sciadiocrinus								
Sclerocrinus								
Scoliocrinus								
Scotiacrinus								
Scotocrinus								
Scyphocrinites								
Scytalocrinus								
Seirocrinus								
Sellardsicrinus								
Semiometra								
Senariocrinus								
Separocrinus								
Serendipocrinus								
Shidianocrinus								
Shimantocrinus								
Shroshaecrinus								
Siderocrinus								
Sievertsia								
Sigambrocrinus								
Silfonocrinus								
Siliesiacrinus								
Simocrinus								
Simplococrinus								
Singularocrinus								
Sinocrinus								
Sinopetalocrinus								
Siphonocrinus								
Situlacrinus								
Skaiocrinus								
Solanocrinites								
Solonaerium								
Somphocrinus								
Sostronocrinus								
Souticrinus								
Spaniocrinus								
Sphaerocrinus								
Sphaerotocrinus								
Spheniscocrinus								
Springeracrocrinus								
Springericrinus								
Spriocrinus								
Spyridiocrinus								
Stachyocrinus								
Stamnocrinus								
Staphylocrinus								
Steganocrinus								
Stelidiocrinus								
Stellarocrinus								
Stenometra								
Stenopecrinus								
Stereoaster								
Stereobrachicrinus								
Stibarocrinus								
Stinocrinus								
Stipatocrinus								
Stiptocrinus								
Stiremetra								
Stomiocrinus								
Storthingocrinus								
Strambergocrinus								
Streblocrinus								
Streptocrinus								
Strimplecrinus								
Strobocrinus								
Strongylocrinus								
Strotocrinus								
Struszocrinus								
Stuartwellercrinus								
Stylocrinus								
Styracocrinus								
Subarrectocrinus								
Sublobalocrinus								
Sundacrinus								
Sunwaptacrinus								
Sycocrinites								
Sygcaulocrinus								
Synaptocrinus								
Synarmocrinus								
Synbathocrinus								
Synchirocrinus								
Syndetocrinus								
Synerocrinus								
Syntomocrinus								
Synyphocrinus								
Tagenocrinus								
Taidocrinus								
Talarocrinus								
Tapinocrinus								
Tarachiocrinus								
Tarantocrinus								
Tasmanocrinus								
Taucatillocrinus								
Taurocrinus								
Taxocrinus								
Technocrinus								
Teleiocrinus								
Telikosocrinus								
Teliocrinus								
Temnocrinus								
Tenagocrinus								
Terocrinus								
Terpnocrinus								
Tetrabrachiocrinus								
Tetracionocrinus								
Tetracrinus								
Tetractocrinus								
Tetractocrinus								
Tetragonocrinus								
Tetramerocrinites								
Tetrapleurocrinus								
Texacrinus								
Thalamocrinus								
Thallocrinus								
Thaminocrinus								
Thamnocrinus								
Theleproktocrinus								
Theloreus								
Thenarocrinus								
Thetidicrinus								
Thiolliericrinus								
Tholocrinus								
Thomasocrinus								
Thuringocrinus								
Thylacocrinus								
Thyridocrinus								
Tiaracrinus								
Timorechinus								
Tirocrinus								
Tollmannicrinus	Klikushin	1992	Entrochus saklibelensis Kristan-Tollmann, 1975	Holocrinidae	extinct	Triassic (Anisian - Carnian)	Italy, Hungary, Turkey, China, New Zealand	
Tornatilicrinus								
Torrocrinus								
Torynocrinus								
Trampidocrinus								
Traskocrinus								
Traumatocrinus								
Trautscholdicrinus								
Treocrinus								
Triacrinus								
Triboloporus								
Tribrachyocrinus								
Triceracrinus								
Trichinocrinus								
Trichocrinus								
Trichotocrinus								
Trimerocrinus								
Trinalicrinus								
Tripatocrinus								
Trochocrinites								
Trochocrinites								
Trophocrinus								
Trybliocrinus								
Trypherocrinus								
Tryssocrinus								
Tulipacrinus								
Tundracrinus								
Tunguskocrinus								
Tunisiacrinus								
Turbocrinus								
Typanocrinus								
Tyrieocrinus								
Tyrolecrinus								
Uintacrinus								
Ulocrinus								
Ulrichicrinus								
Umbocrinus								
Uperocrinus								
Ureocrinus								
Utharocrinus								
Vadarocrinus								
Vasocrinus								
Vertigocrinus								
Vicetiametra								
Virucrinus								
Vosekocrinus								
Vostocovacrinus								
Wachsmuthicrinus								
Wannerocrinus								
Westheadocrinus								
Wetherbyocrinus								
Whiteocrinus								
Wilsonicrinus								
Woodocrinus								
Worthenocrinus								
Wrightocrinus								
Xenocatillocrinus								
Xenocrinus								
Xisoallogecrinus								
Xysmacrinus								
Yakovlevicrinus								
Zeacrinites								
Zenkericrinus								
Zenocrinus								
Zeusocrinus								
Zirocrinus								
Zophocrinus								
Zostocrinus								
Zygotocrinus								

== See also ==
- List of prehistoric brittle stars
- List of prehistoric sea cucumbers
- List of prehistoric starfish
