= Amphorometra waitakiana =

Scientific classification
- Kingdom: Animalia
- Phylum: Echinodermata
- Class: Crinoidea
- Superorder: Articulata
- Order: Comatulida
- Suborder: Oligophreata
- Family: †Conometridae
- Genus: †Amphorometra
- Species: †A. waitakiana

Binomial name
- †Amphorometra waitakiana Eagle, 2008

Extinct genus of gastropods

Amphorometra waitakiana is an extinct species of crinoids in the family Conometridae. The species is known from fossils found in New Zealand, dating to the Late Oligocene, and is the currently oldest known member of the genus Comaster.

== Description ==
A. waitakiana has a roughly circular ventral face, a conical centrodorsal, is devoid of radial pits or coelomic impressions, is smooth, concave, and is shaped irregularly at edges. It can be distinguished from other members of the genus due to its centrodorsal not being embayed at the radial periphery, by having a moderate, circular, centrodorsal cavity, and due to its broad basal furrows that do not change distally (either by reducing or enlarging).

== Taxonomy ==
The genus was first described by Michael K. Eagle in 2008, based on fossils found in Late Oligocene formations in New Zealand, including the Meyers Pass Limestone Member. C. meyerensis extends the fossil range for Amphorometra, which previously was first known to occur in Late Cretaceous and Paleocene fossils found in Europe and North Africa. A paratype of the species is held at the Auckland War Memorial Museum.

The species epithet waitakiana refers to the Waitakian stage, a local stage of the Oligocene in New Zealand, where the holotype was found.
