= Vicetiametra otiakeensis =

Scientific classification
- Kingdom: Animalia
- Phylum: Echinodermata
- Class: Crinoidea
- Superorder: Articulata
- Order: Comatulida
- Family: †Conometridae
- Genus: †Vicetiametra
- Species: †V. otiakeensis

Binomial name
- †Vicetiametra otiakeensis Eagle, 2008

Extinct genus of gastropods

Vicetiametra otiakeensis is an extinct species of crinoid in the family Conometridae. The species is known from fossils found in New Zealand, dating to the Late Oligocene, and is the currently oldest known member of the genus Vicetiametra.

== Description ==
Vicetiametra otiakeensis is hemispherical, and has a subpentagonal outline, a truncated subconical centrodorsal and irregularly arranged large cirrus sockets. The species has a large rounded dorsal area with no cirrus, dorsal star or impression, ans is slightly rugose. The calyx has a diameter of 4.3 mm (0.17 in), a centrodorsal height of 3.1 mm (0.12 in), and a height of 4.8 mm (0.19 in). It can be differentiated from V. albertinii by V. otiakeensis having a lower adradial inclination angle, larger ventral muscular fossae, and a rounder outline.

== Taxonomy ==
The genus was first described by Michael K. Eagle in 2008, based on fossils found in Late Oligocene formations in New Zealand, including the Meyers Pass Limestone Member and the Otiake Group. V. otiakeensis extends the fossil range for Vicetiametra, which previously was first known to occur in Late Cretaceous and Paleocene fossils found in Europe and North Africa. A paratype of the species is held at the Auckland War Memorial Museum.

The species epithet otiakeensis refers to the Otiake Group, where the holotype was found.
