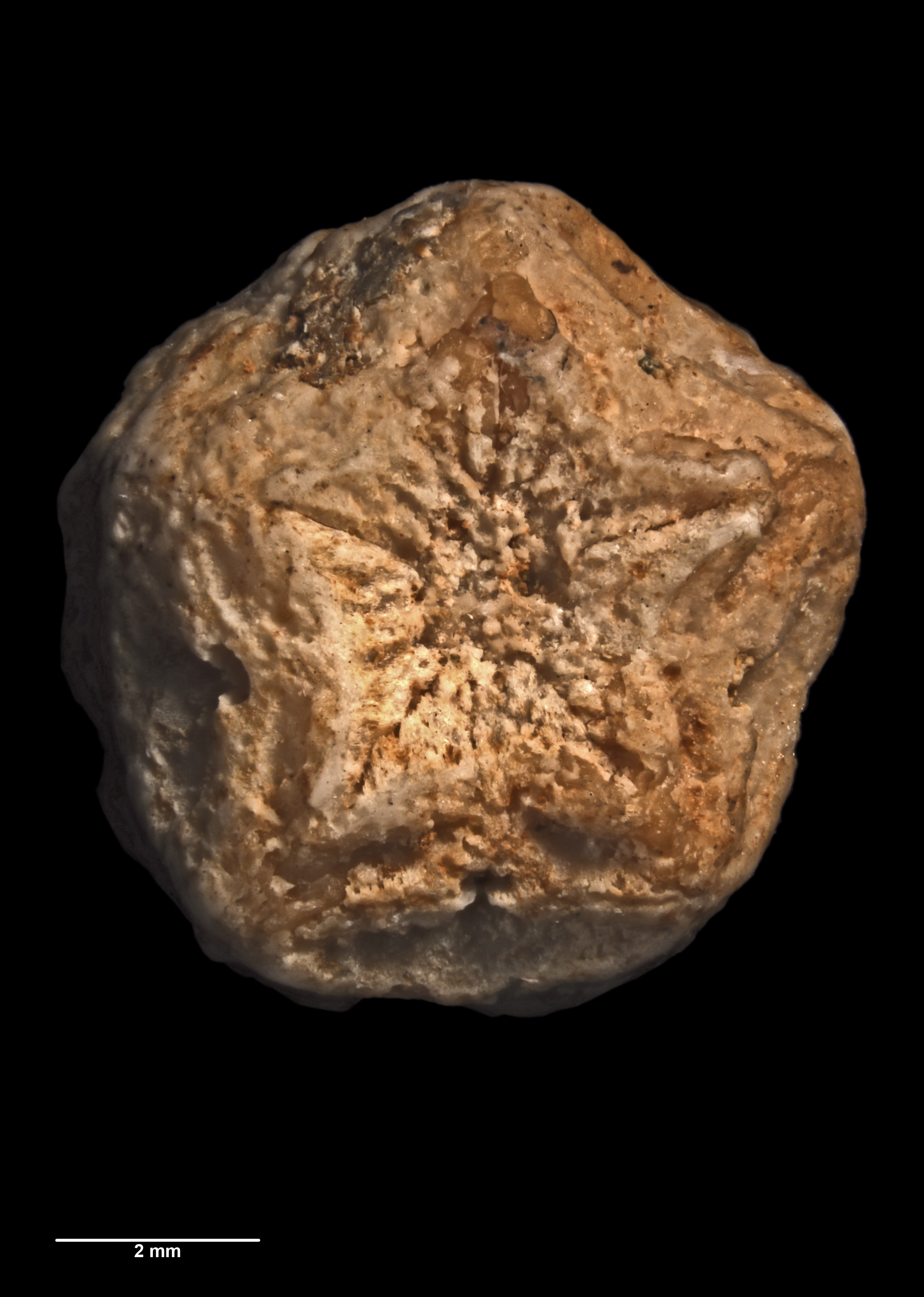
- Holotype of Moanametra torehinaensis

Scientific classification
- Kingdom: Animalia
- Phylum: Echinodermata
- Class: Crinoidea
- Superorder: Articulata
- Order: Comatulida
- Suborder: Oligophreata
- Family: †Conometridae
- Genus: †Moanametra; Eagle, 2001
- Species: †M. torehinaensis

Binomial name
- †Moanametra torehinaensis Eagle, 2001

= Moanametra =

Extinct genus of crinoids

Moanametra is an extinct genus of crinoids in the family Conometridae. The genus is monotypic, containing one species, Moanametra torehinaensis, a fossil taxon dating from the Late Oligocene, found in New Zealand.

== Description ==
Moanametra has an arched conical centrodorsal, with an aboral apex without cirrus. The genus has 2-4 cirrus sockets located in 15 vertical columns that covers the controdorsal, something not seen in similar taxa Amphorometra or Jaekelometra.

== Taxonomy ==
The genus was first described by Michael K. Eagle in 2001, based on fossils found in Late Oligocene formations in New Zealand, collected from the Torehina Formation at Waitete Bay on the Coromandel Peninsula. Eagle described both the genus Moanametra and species M. torehinaensis in the same paper. The holotype of the species are held at the Auckland War Memorial Museum.

The genus name Moanametra was formed by combining the Māori language word moana (meaning 'ocean') with the comatulid suffix metra ("combining form"). The species epithet torehinaensis was named after the Torehina Formation.
