= Palaeantedon pentlandica =

Scientific classification
- Kingdom: Animalia
- Phylum: Echinodermata
- Class: Crinoidea
- Superorder: Articulata
- Order: Comatulida
- Genus: †Palaeantedon
- Species: †P. pentlandica

Binomial name
- †Palaeantedon pentlandica Eagle, 2008

Extinct genus of gastropods

Palaeantedon pentlandica is an extinct species of crinoid in the order Comatulida. The species is known from fossils found in New Zealand.

== Description ==
Palaeantedon pentlandica has a hemispherical centrodorsal, no cirrus in its dorsal area, and is convex, granulated at the dorsal pole. The species has numerous cirrus sockets, numbering between 40 and 60. The calyx has a diameter of 3.7 mm (0.15 in), a centrodorsal height of 3.0 mm (0.12 in), and a height of 4.7 mm (0.19 in). It can be differentiated from other members by the number of, size and arrangement of cirrus sockets. It differs from P. caroliniana due to having a lower radial facet, a small centrodorsal cavity, sharply defined triangular interarticular ligament fossae, and larger (but fewer) cirrus sockets, and from P. soluta but being deeply arched, having a deeper, broader dorsal ligament pit area, a thinner dorsal radial edge and an adradial facet with a lower inclination angle. The species has a more elongated rounded controdorsal relative to P. ambigua, and a lower radial face.

== Taxonomy ==
The genus was first described by Michael K. Eagle in 2008, based on fossils found in Late Oligocene formations in New Zealand. The species epithet pentlandica refers to the Pentland Hills in South Canterbury, where the holotype was found.
