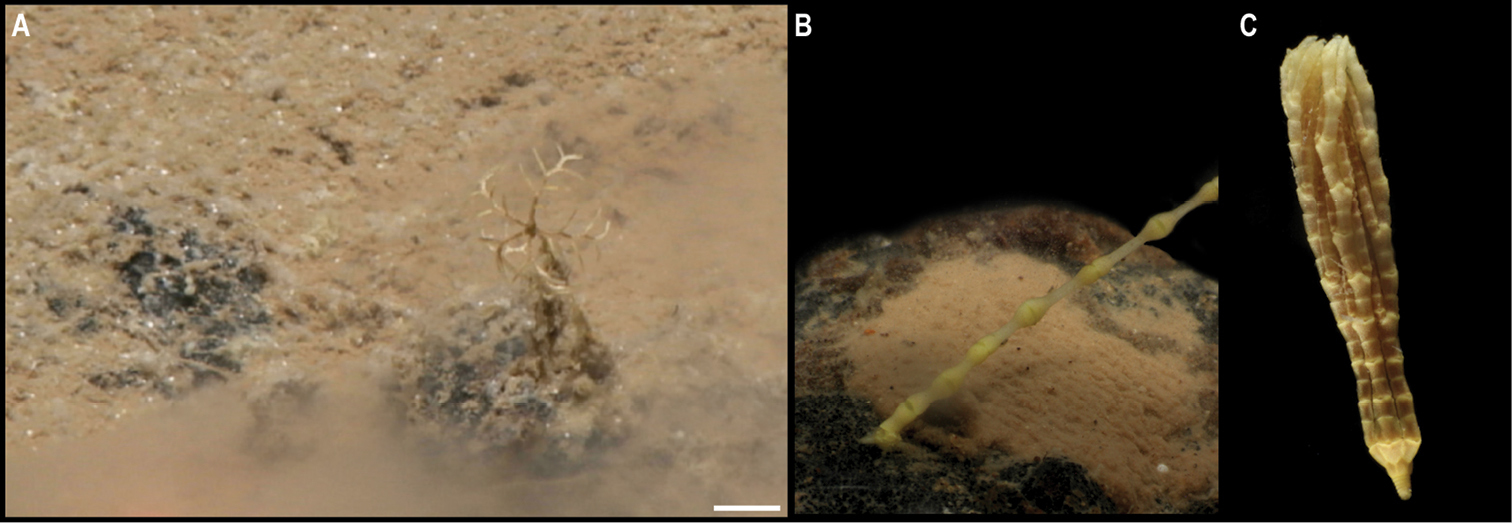
- Porphyrocrinus

Scientific classification
- Kingdom: Animalia
- Phylum: Echinodermata
- Class: Crinoidea
- Superorder: Articulata
- Order: Comatulida
- Family: Phrynocrinidae
- Genus: Porphyrocrinus; Gislén 1925

Type species
- Porphyrocrinus verrucosus Gislén, 1925

= Porphyrocrinus =

Genus of crinoids

Porphyrocrinus is a genus of crinoids within the family Phrynocrinidae. Members of this genus have been found from 2103 to 4240 meters below sea level.

== Species ==
- Porphyrocrinus daniellalevyae Messing, 2016
- Porphyrocrinus incrassatus (Gislén, 1933)
- Porphyrocrinus thalassae Roux 1977
- Porphyrocrinus verrucosus Gislén 1925
