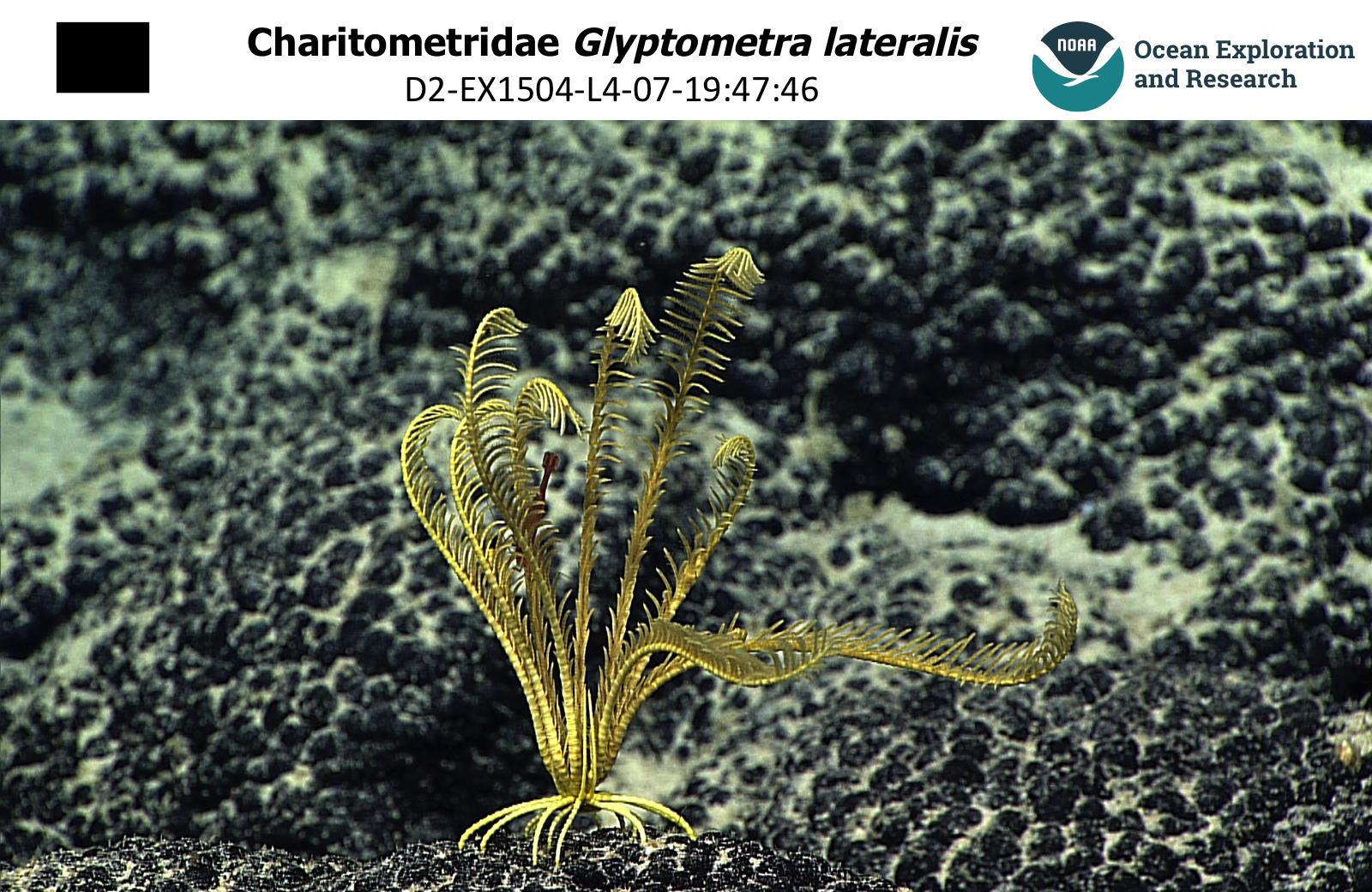

Scientific classification
- Kingdom: Animalia
- Phylum: Echinodermata
- Class: Crinoidea
- Superorder: Articulata
- Order: Comatulida
- Family: Charitometridae
- Genus: Glyptometra
- Species: G. lateralis

Binomial name
- Glyptometra lateralis (A.H. Clark, 1908)

Synonyms
- Calyptometra lateralis (AH Clark, 1908); Charitometra lateralis AH Clark, 1908

= Glyptometra lateralis =

Species of echinoderm

Glyptometra lateralis is a species of crinoid within the family Charitometridae. The species is found off Niihau at depths of 583 to 824 meters below sea level, although some individuals have been found as deep as 1748 meters.
