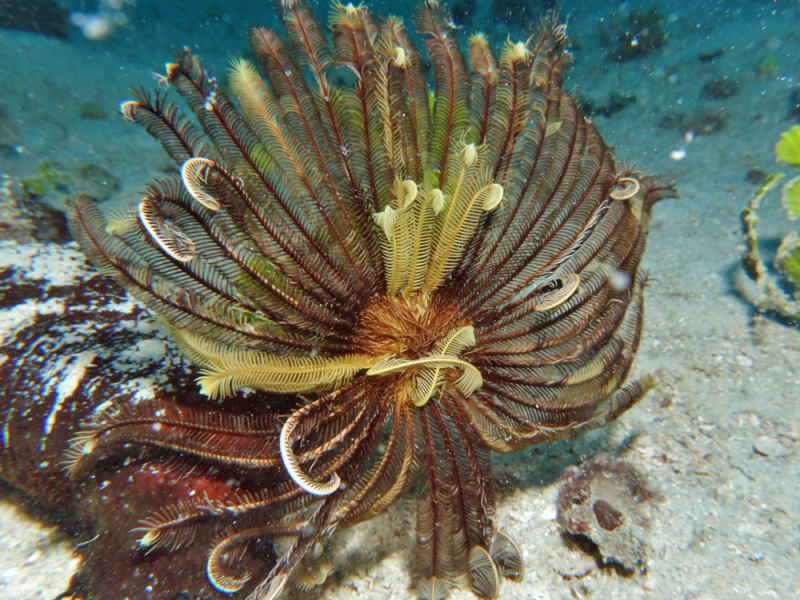
- Zygometra microdiscus

Scientific classification
- Kingdom: Animalia
- Phylum: Echinodermata
- Class: Crinoidea
- Superorder: Articulata
- Order: Comatulida
- Family: Zygometridae
- Genus: Zygometra; A.H. Clark, 1907

= Zygometra =

Genus of echinoderms

Zygometra is a genus of crinoids within the family Zygometridae. Members of this genus are found at depths of 10 to 162.5 meters in the Indo-Pacific around countries such as Australia, Indonesia, Malaysia and the Philippines.

== Species ==
- Zygometra andromeda AH Clark, 1912
- Zygometra comata AH Clark, 1911
- Zygometra elegans (Bell, 1882)
- Zygometra microdiscus (Bell, 1882)
- Zygometra pristina AH Clark, 1911
- Zygometra punctata AH Clark, 1912
