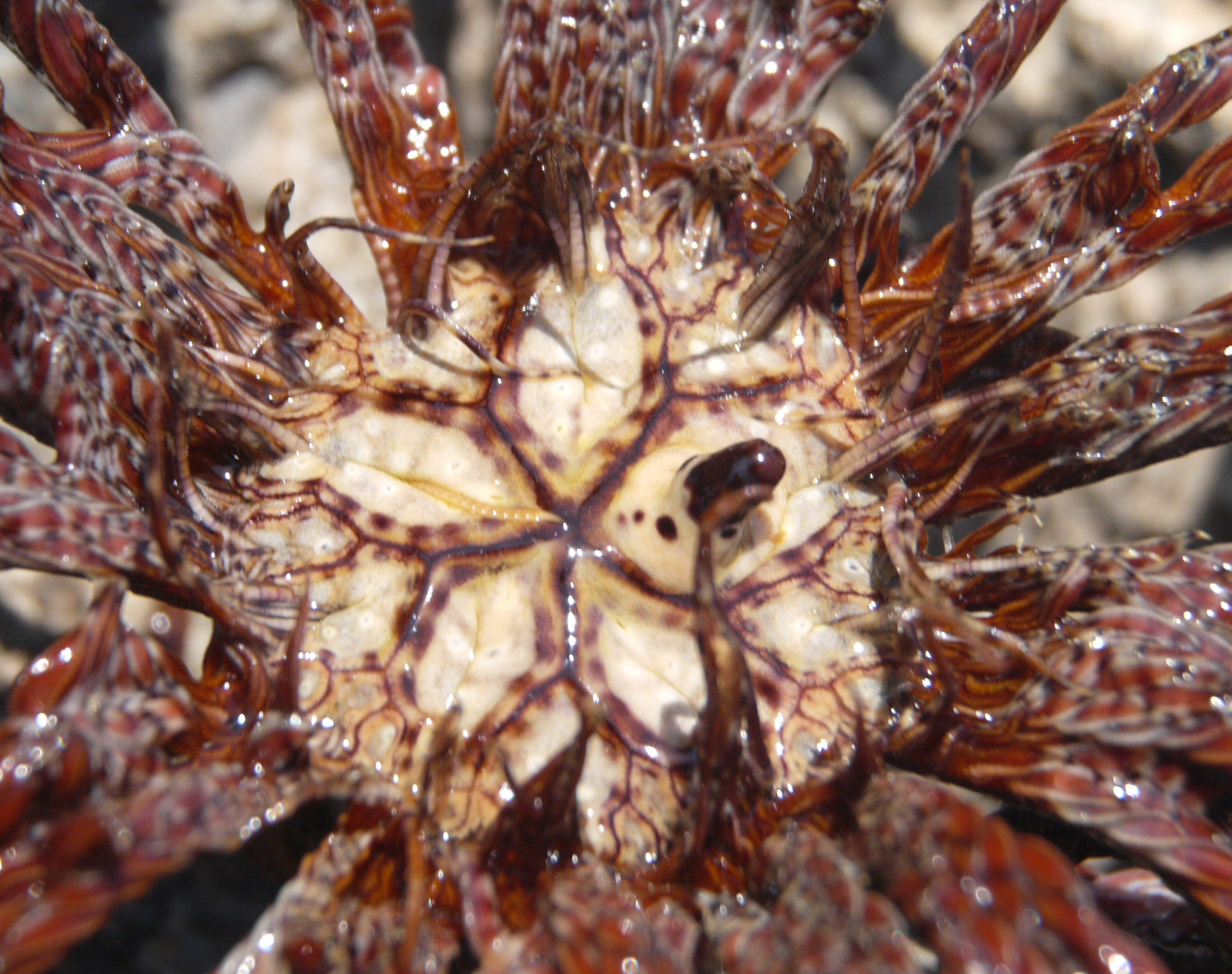

Scientific classification
- Kingdom: Animalia
- Phylum: Echinodermata
- Class: Crinoidea
- Superorder: Articulata
- Order: Comatulida
- Family: Mariametridae
- Genus: Dichrometra
- Species: D. palmata

Binomial name
- Dichrometra palmata (Müller, 1841)

Synonyms
- Lamprometra palmata (Müller, 1841)

= Dichrometra palmata =

Species of echinoderm

Dichrometra palmata is a species of echinoderms belonging to the family Mariametridae.

It is native to Indian Ocean and Malesia.
