= Palaeantedon =

Scientific classification
- Kingdom: Animalia
- Phylum: Echinodermata
- Class: Crinoidea
- Superorder: Articulata
- Order: Comatulida
- Genus: †Palaeantedon; Gislén, 1924

Extinct genus of crinoids

Palaeantedon is an extinct genus of crinoids in the order Comatulida.

== Description ==
Members of Palaeantedon have an arched to hemispherical centrodorsal, and are aborally rounded without having a dorsal star or depression, or an area significantly free of cirrus. The members of the genus have numerous small cirrus sockets without ornaments, or with a slightly elevated margin near the axial pore.

== Taxonomy ==
The genus was first described by Torsten Gislén in 1924, who included ten species previously included in the genus Antedon. Palaeantedon soluta (also known as Palaeantedon solutus, Antedon soluta or Antedon solutus) is the type species for the genus.

== Range ==
Fossils from this genus are found from the Eocene to the Pleistocene in North America (found in South Carolina), the Late Oligocene in New Zealand, the Miocene (Europe and North Africa) and the Pliocene in North Africa.

== Species ==
- † Palaeantedon ambigua (Pomel, 1887)
- † Palaeantedon caroliniana Gislén, 1934
- † Palaeantedon cartenniensis (Pomel, 1887)
- † Palaeantedon danica (Brunnicu-Nielsen, 1913)
- † Palaeantedon depressa Gislén, 1924
- † Palaeantedon globosa (Pomel, 1887)
- † Palaeantedon lineata (Pomel, 1887)
- † Palaeantedon minima (Noëlli, 1900)
- † Palaeantedon pannonica (Vadasz, 1900)
- † Palaeantedon pentlandica Eagle, 2008
- † Palaeantedon rosacea (Pomel, 1887)
- † Palaeantedon soluta (Pomel, 1887)
