= Maorimetridae =

Scientific classification
- Kingdom: Animalia
- Phylum: Echinodermata
- Class: Crinoidea
- Superorder: Articulata
- Order: Comatulida
- Superfamily: Tropiometroidea
- Family: †Maorimetridae; Eagle, 2008

Type genus
- †Maorimetra Eagle, 2008

Type species
- †Maorimetra ardlogiensis Eagle, 2008

Family of crinoids

Maorimetridae is a taxonomic family of crinoids in the order Comatulida. The family is monotypic, containing one genus, Maorimetra, and one species, Maorimetra ardlogiensis, a fossil taxon dating from the Late Oligocene.

== Description ==
Members of the family have a truncated-conical centrodorsal profile, a narrow centrodorsal cavity and basal rod interradial points that overhangs the centrodorsal ventral periphery. Another identifying feature is a large, apically rounded, evenly granulated and high-standing cirrus-free area of the centrodorsal. Members of the family can be distinguished due to the presence of a single circle of 15 uniform cirrus sockets, compared to Conometridae, which has 10 cirrus sockets.

== Taxonomy ==
The family was first described by Michael K. Eagle in 2008, based on fossils found in Late Oligocene formations in New Zealand, including the Meyers Pass Limestone Member and the Otekaike Limestone Formation. Eagle described the genus Maorimetra and species M. ardlogiensis in the same paper.

The genus name Maorimetra was formed by combining the name of the Māori people with the suffix metra ("combining form"), and the species epithet ardlogiensis was named after Ardlogie Station, the location where the fossils were found.

== Ecology ==
Members of this family lived in shallow, inner or middle shelfs, and are often found in association with stalked crinoids at the Oligocene–Miocene boundary.
