= Pseudoconometridae =

Scientific classification
- Kingdom: Animalia
- Phylum: Echinodermata
- Class: Crinoidea
- Superorder: Articulata
- Order: Comatulida
- Family: †Pseudoconometridae; Eagle, 2001

Type genus
- †Pseudoconometra Eagle, 2001

Type species
- †Pseudoconometra coromandelensis Eagle, 2001

Family of crinoids

Pseudoconometridae is a taxonomic family of crinoids in the order Comatulida. The family is monotypic, containing one genus, Pseudoconometra, and one species, P. coromandelensis, a fossil taxon found in New Zealand, dating from the Late Oligocene.

== Description ==
Members of the family have a conical centrodorsal, a circular ventral face with five radial pits, and five distinct basal furrows. The centrodorsal is covered by 15 vertical columns of seven to ten cirrus sockets without ornaments. Pseudoconometridae have a large cirrus-free area on the dorsal, and no dorsal star.

== Taxonomy ==
The family was first described by Michael K. Eagle in 2001, based on fossils found in Late Oligocene formations in New Zealand, collected from the Torehina Formation at Waitete Bay on the Coromandel Peninsula. Eagle described the genus Pseudoconometra and species P. coromandelensis in the same paper.
