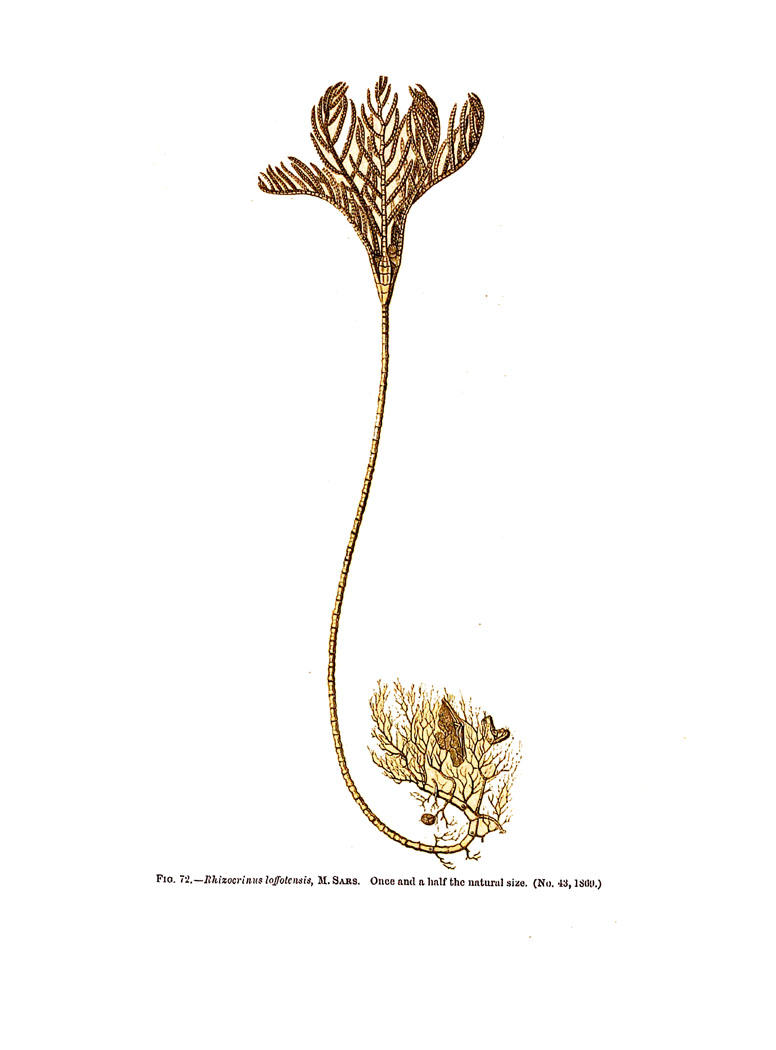
- Illustration of Conocrinus lofotensis

Scientific classification
- Kingdom: Animalia
- Phylum: Echinodermata
- Class: Crinoidea
- Order: Comatulida
- Family: Bourgueticrinidae
- Genus: Conocrinus d'Orbigny, 1850

= Conocrinus =

Genus of sea lilies

Conocrinus is a genus of sea lilies in the family Bourguticrinidae, containing 6 species.

== Species ==
- Conocrinus cabiochi Roux, 1976
- Conocrinus cherbonnieri Roux, 1976
- Conocrinus globularis (Gislén, 1925)
- Conocrinus lofotensis (Sars, 1868)
- Conocrinus minimus (Döderlein, 1907)
- Conocrinus poculum (Döderlein, 1907)
