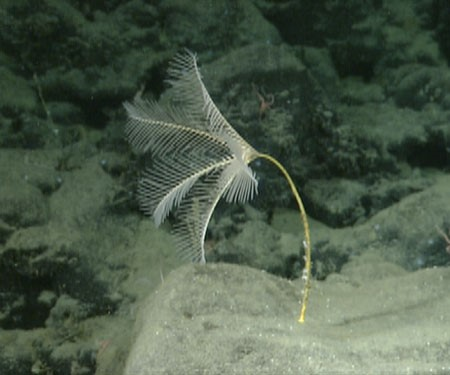
- Hyocrinus sp.

Scientific classification
- Kingdom: Animalia
- Phylum: Echinodermata
- Class: Crinoidea
- Superorder: Articulata
- Order: Hyocrinida; Rasmussen, 1978
- Family: Hyocrinidae; Carpenter, 1884

= Hyocrinidae =

Family of echinoderms

Hyocrinidae is a family of echinoderms, the only family in the order Hyocrinida.

== Characteristics ==
Members of this order have long slender stems consisting of a large number of identical columnar units. There are no cirri, and the basal disc of the stem attaches directly to the substrate. The calyx is globular or conical, and consists of five widely-spaced, undivided arms attached to five radial ossicles.

== Distribution ==
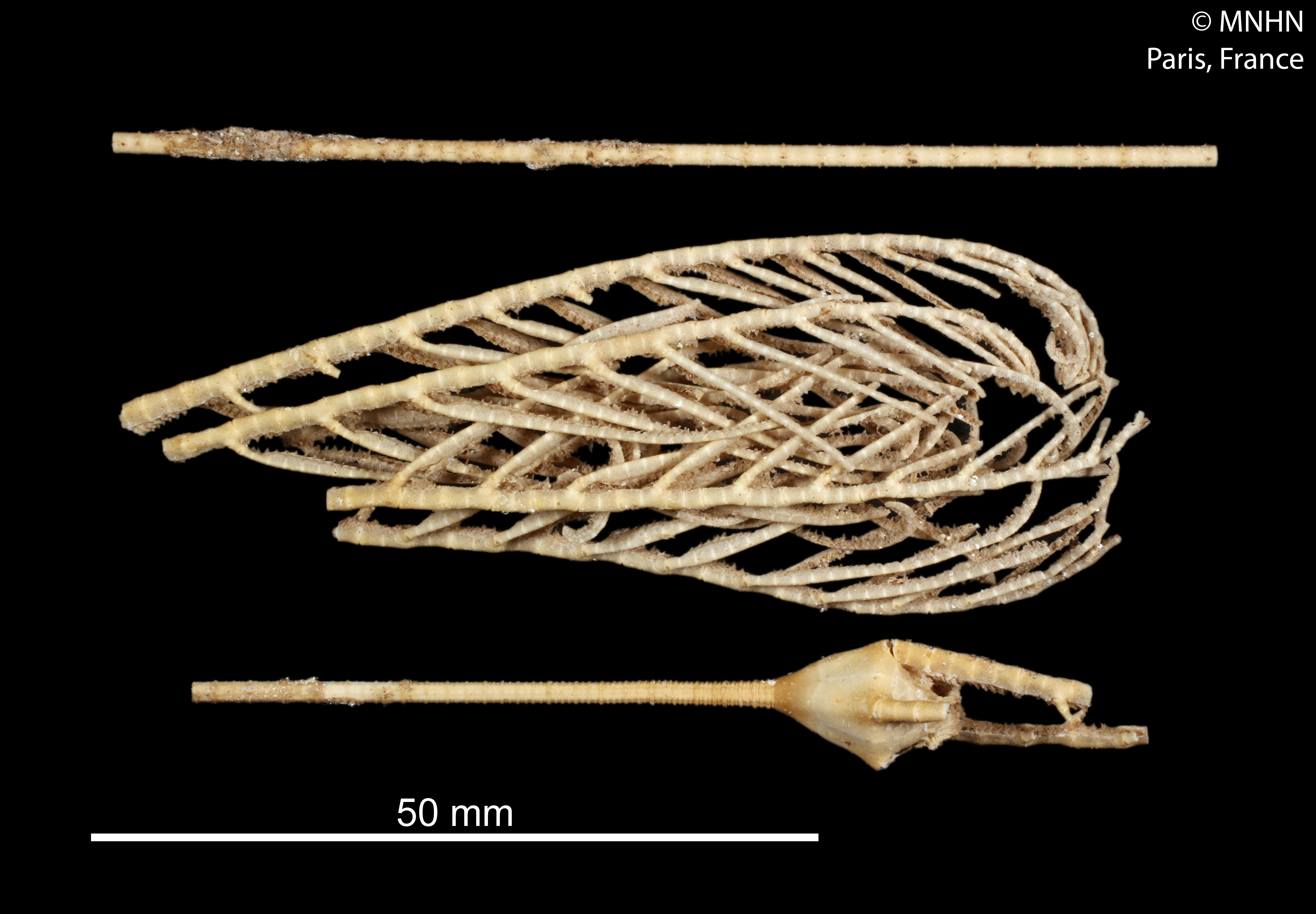
Hyocrinus cyanae

Most hyocrinids are found at depths below 700 m (2,300 ft), in the range 400 to 6,300 m (1,300 to 20,700 ft), in all the ocean basins and on seamounts.

== Genera ==
Genera:

- Ailsacrinus Mironov & Sorokina, 1998
- Anachalypsicrinus AM Clark, 1973
- Belyaevicrinus (Mironov & Sorokina, 1998)
- Calamocrinus Agassiz, 1890
- Camaecrinus Mironov & Sorokina, 1998
- Chambersaecrinus Mironov & Sorokina, 1998
- Dumetocrinus Mironov & Sorokina, 1998
- Feracrinus Mironov & Sorokina, 1998
- Gephyrocrinus Koehler & Bather, 1902
- Hyocrinus Thomson, 1876
- Lamberticrinus Roux, 2017
- Laubiericrinus Roux, 2004
- Parahyocrinus Roux, 2017
- Ptilocrinus Clark, 1907
- Thalassocrinus Clark, 1911
- Tiburonicrinus Roux, 2017
