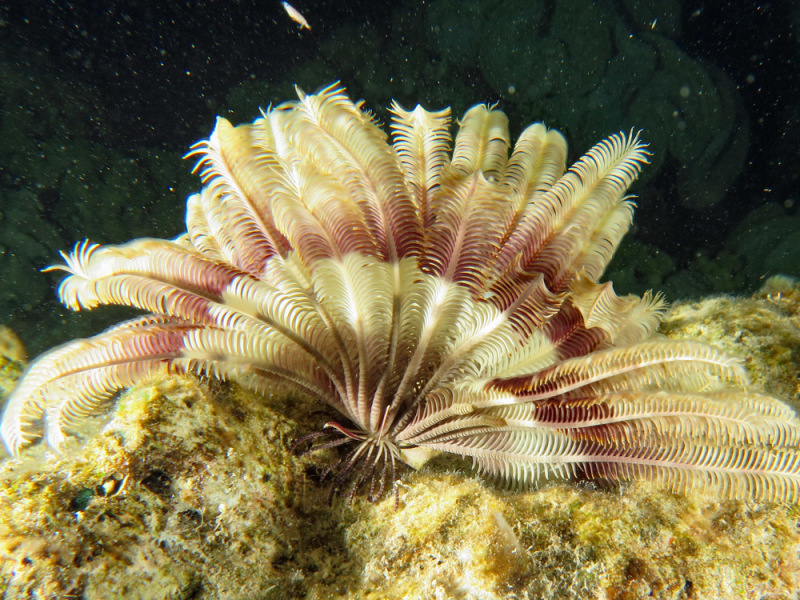
- Dichrometra palmata

Scientific classification
- Domain: Eukaryota
- Kingdom: Animalia
- Phylum: Echinodermata
- Class: Crinoidea
- Order: Comatulida
- Family: Mariametridae
- Genus: Dichrometra; Clark, 1909

= Dichrometra =

Genus of echinoderms

Dichrometra is a genus of echinoderms belonging to the family Mariametridae.

Species:

- Dichrometra articulata (Müller, 1849)
- Dichrometra austini AM Clark, 1972
- Dichrometra bimaculata (Carpenter, 1881)
- Dichrometra brachypecha (H.L. Clark, 1915)
- Dichrometra ciliata AH Clark, 1912
- Dichrometra doederleini (Loriol, 1900)
- Dichrometra flagellata (Müller, 1841)
- Dichrometra grandis (AH Clark, 1908)
- Dichrometra gyges (Bell, 1884)
- Dichrometra palmata (Müller, 1841)
- Dichrometra regalis (Carpenter, 1888)
- Dichrometra stylifer (AH Clark, 1907)
- Dichrometra tenuicirra AH Clark, 1912
