= Vicetiametra =

Scientific classification
- Kingdom: Animalia
- Phylum: Echinodermata
- Class: Crinoidea
- Order: Comatulida
- Family: †Conometridae
- Genus: †Vicetiametra; Malarodo, 1950

Extinct genus of crinoids

Vicetiametra is an extinct genus of crinoids in the family Conometridae.

== Description ==
Members of Vicetiametra have a hemispherical or truncated subconical centrodorsal, with rounded, cirrus-free dorsal sides. Members of the genus have large cirrus sockets without a distinct ridge that are irregularly arranged.

== Taxonomy ==
The genus was first described by Roberto Malaroda in 1950. Vicetiametra is a fossil taxa, dating from the Late Oligocene onwards. The 2008 description of the species Vicetiametra otiakeensis extended the stratigraphic range back further from the Late Eocene to the Late Oligocene, and was the first member of the genus to be discovered in the Southern Hemisphere.

== Species ==
- † Vicetiametra albertinii Malaroda, 1950
- † Vicetiametra otiakeensis Eagle, 2008
