= Amphorometra =

Scientific classification
- Kingdom: Animalia
- Phylum: Echinodermata
- Class: Crinoidea
- Superorder: Articulata
- Order: Comatulida
- Family: †Conometridae
- Genus: †Amphorometra; Gislén, 1924

Extinct genus of crinoids

Amphorometra is an extinct genus of crinoids in the family Conometridae.

== Description ==
Members of the genus have no dorsal star or radial pits.

== Taxonomy ==
The genus was first described by Torsten Gislén in 1924, who named the genus after the Ancient Greek word amphoreús (referring to amphora vases).

== Species ==
- † Amphorometra atacica (Doncieux, 1911)
- † Amphorometra brydonei Gislen, 1924
- † Amphorometra waitakiana Eagle, 2008
