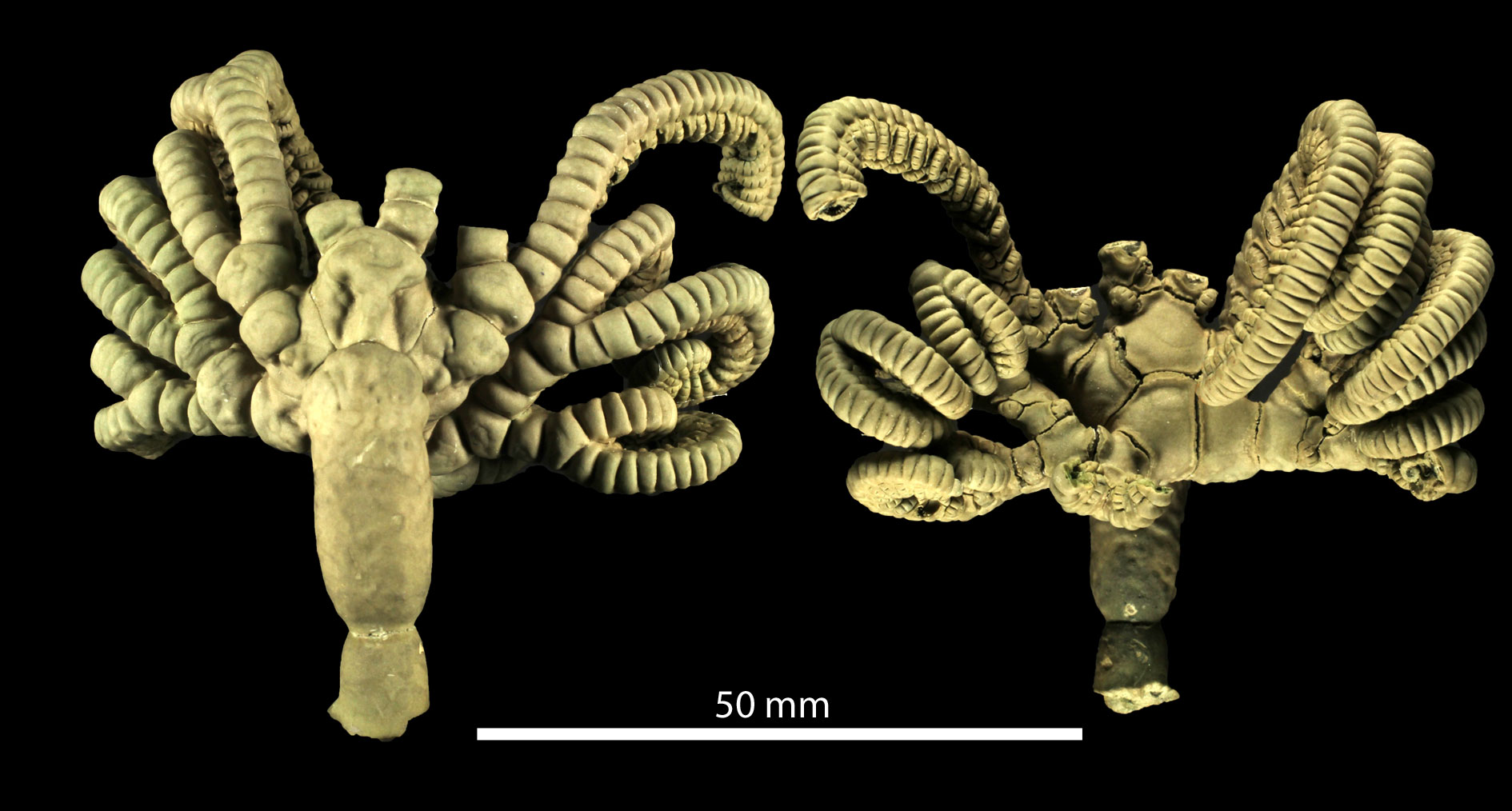

Scientific classification
- Kingdom: Animalia
- Phylum: Echinodermata
- Class: Crinoidea
- Superorder: Articulata
- Order: Cyrtocrinida
- Family: Sclerocrinidae

= Sclerocrinidae =

Family of echinoderms

Sclerocrinidae is a family of echinoderms belonging to the order Millericrinida.

Genera:

- Ascidicrinus Hess, Salamon & Gorzelak, 2011
- Cyrtocrinus Jaekel, 1892
- Hemicrinus d'Orbigny, 1850
- Neogymnocrinus Hess, 2006
- Pilocrinus Jaekel, 1907
- Proholopus Jaekel, 1908
- Sclerocrinus Jaekel, 1892
- Torynocrinus Seeley, 1866
