= Calometridae =

Scientific classification
- Kingdom: Animalia
- Phylum: Echinodermata
- Class: Crinoidea
- Superorder: Articulata
- Order: Comatulida
- Superfamily: Tropiometroidea
- Family: Calometridae; A.H. Clark, 1911

Family of echinoderms

Calometridae is a family of echinoderms belonging to the order Comatulida.

Genera:

- Calometra Clark, 1907
- Gephyrometra Clark, 1912
- Kiimetra Shibata & Oji, 2007
- Neometra Clark, 1912
- Pectinometra Clark, 1912
- Reometra Clark, 1934
