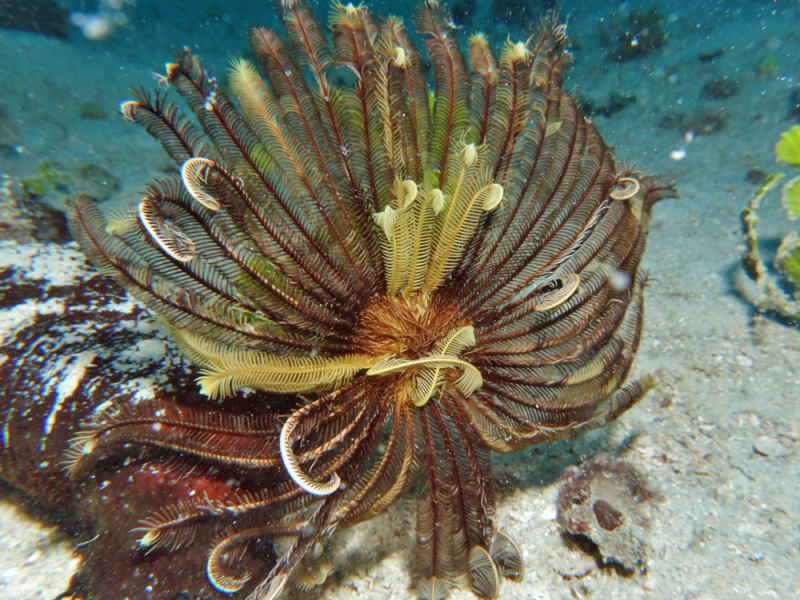
- Zygometra microdiscus

Scientific classification
- Kingdom: Animalia
- Phylum: Echinodermata
- Class: Crinoidea
- Superorder: Articulata
- Order: Comatulida
- Family: Zygometridae; A.H. Clark, 1908

= Zygometridae =

Family of echinoderms

Zygometridae is a family of echinoderms belonging to the order Comatulida.

Genera:

- Catoptometra Clark, 1908
- Zygometra Clark, 1907
