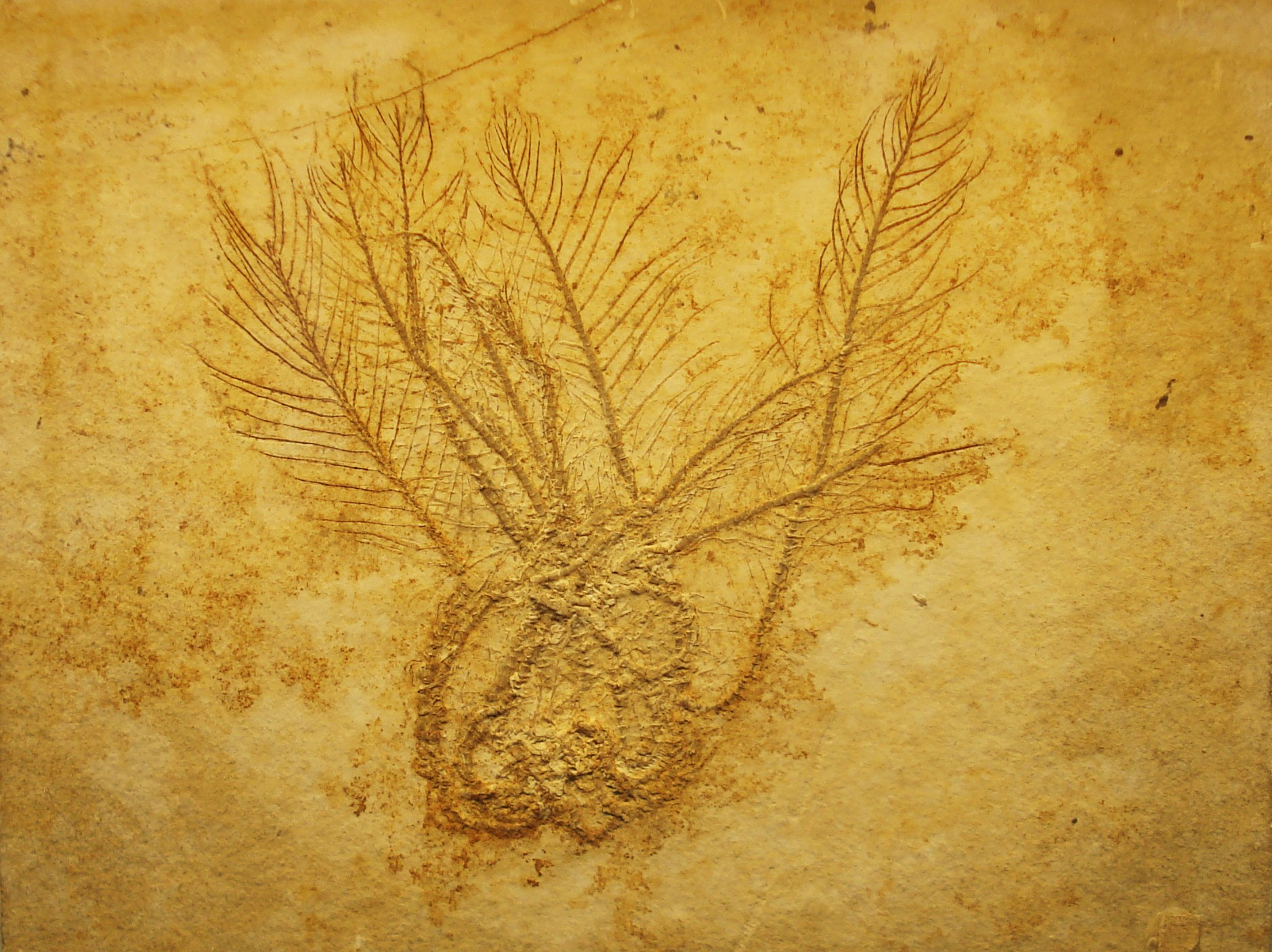
- Pterocoma pennata

Scientific classification
- Kingdom: Animalia
- Phylum: Echinodermata
- Class: Crinoidea
- Order: Comatulida
- Genus: †Pterocoma

= Pterocoma =

Pterocoma Temporal range: Late Jurassic

Extinct genus of crinoids

Pterocoma is an extinct genus of crinoids from the Late Jurassic of Europe.

== Sources ==
- Fossils (Smithsonian Handbooks) by David Ward (Page 171)
