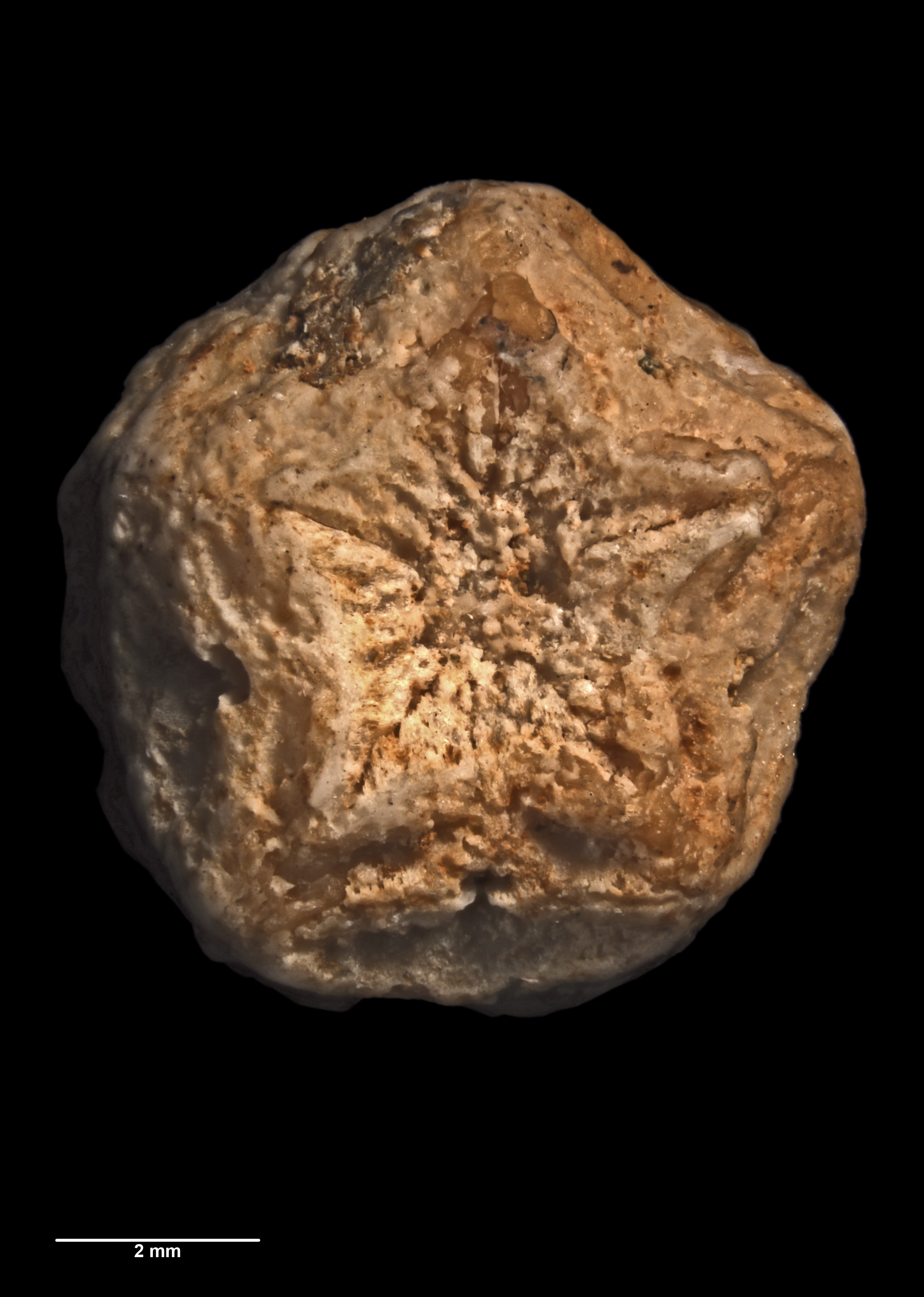
- Moanametra torehinaensis

Scientific classification
- Kingdom: Animalia
- Phylum: Echinodermata
- Class: Crinoidea
- Superorder: Articulata
- Order: Comatulida
- Suborder: Oligophreata
- Family: †Conometridae; Gislén, 1924

= Conometridae =

Family of crinoids

Conometridae is a taxonomic family of crinoids in the order Comatulida.

== Description ==
Members of the family are either conical or discoidal, and no not have radial pits or pores on the ventral side of the animal, and lack a dorsal star.

== Taxonomy ==
The family was first described by Torsten Gislén in 1924, who noted that fossils tended to be found at the Cretaceous–Paleogene boundary. Members of this family have been found in rock as early as the Cenomanian age of the Late Cretaceous, as well as Late Paleocene deposits in Europe and North Africa, and in Eocene-Miocene deposits in Italy, Denmark, New Zealand and South America. Gislén theorised that the family was related to the Upper Jurassic genus Pterocoma, and that these groups may have evolved from the Pentacrinitidae family, or alternatively, the Thalassometridae family.

The type genus is Conometra, which was also described by Gislén in 1924.

== Genera ==
- Amphorometra Gislén, 1924
- Bruennichometra Rasmussen, 1961
- Conometra Gislén, 1924
- Cypelometra Gislén, 1924
- Moanametra Eagle, 2001
- Rautangaroa Baumiller & Fordyce, 2018
- Vicetiametra Malarodo, 1950
