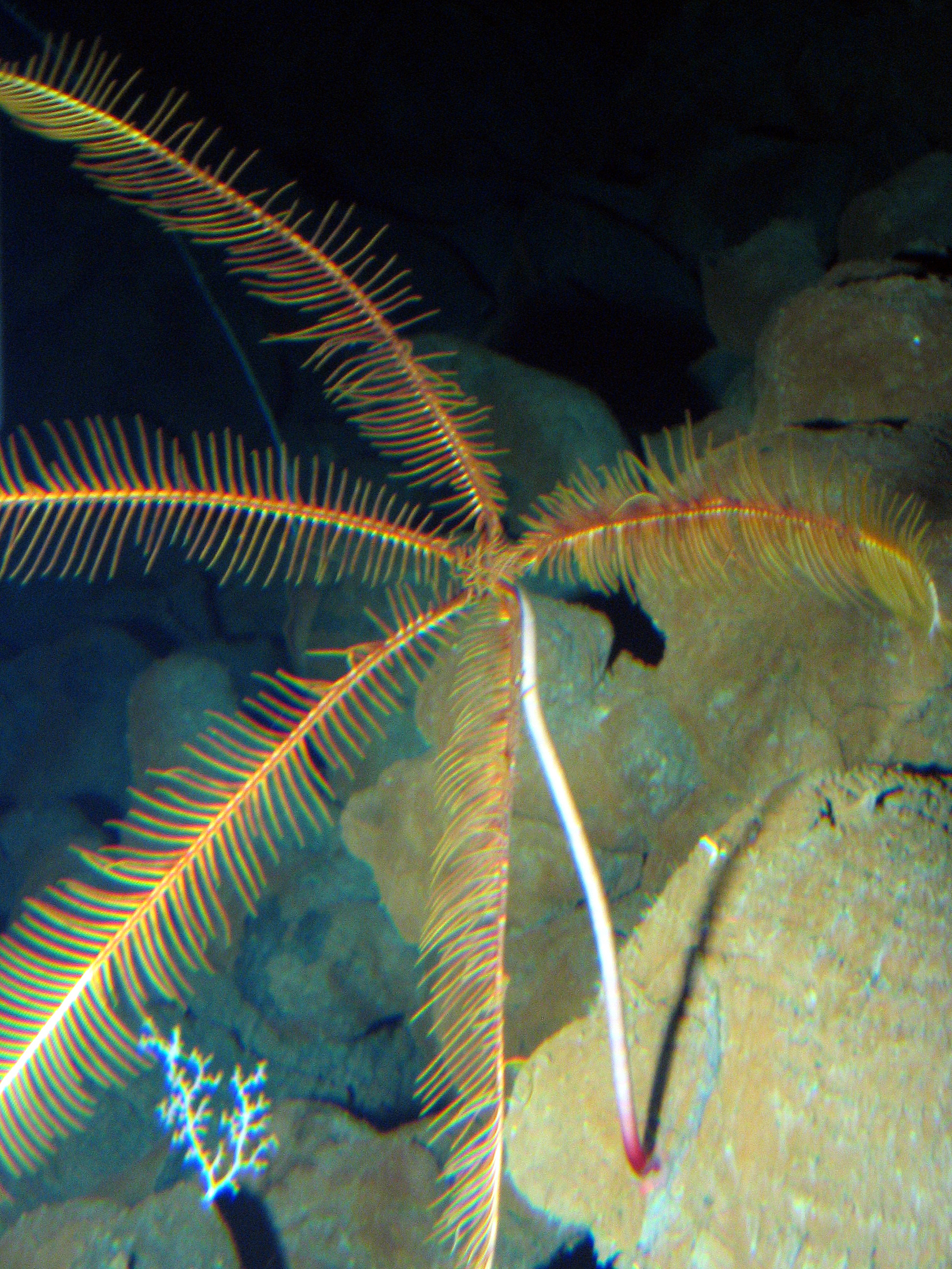
- Guillecrinus neocaledonicus on the outer SW flank of Vailulu'u, American Samoa

Scientific classification
- Kingdom: Animalia
- Phylum: Echinodermata
- Class: Crinoidea
- Order: Comatulida
- Suborder: Bourgueticrinina
- Family: Guillecrinidae; Mironov & Sorokina, 1998

= Guillecrinidae =

Family of echinoderms

Guillecrinidae is a small family of echinoderms in the class Crinoidea, and contains the following genera and species below.

== Genera and species ==
- Guillecrinus Roux, 1985
  - Guillecrinus neocaledonicus Bourseau et al., 1991
  - Guillecrinus reunionensis Roux, 1985
- Vityazicrinus Mironov & Sorokina, 1998
  - Vityazicrinus petrachenkoi Mironov & Sorokina, 1998
