= Eudiocrinus =

Scientific classification
- Kingdom: Animalia
- Phylum: Echinodermata
- Class: Crinoidea
- Superorder: Articulata
- Order: Comatulida
- Family: Eudiocrinidae; A.H. Clark, 1907
- Genus: Eudiocrinus; Carpenter, 1882

Genus of echinoderms

Eudiocrinidae is a family of echinoderms belonging to the order Comatulida. The only genus is Eudiocrinus.
