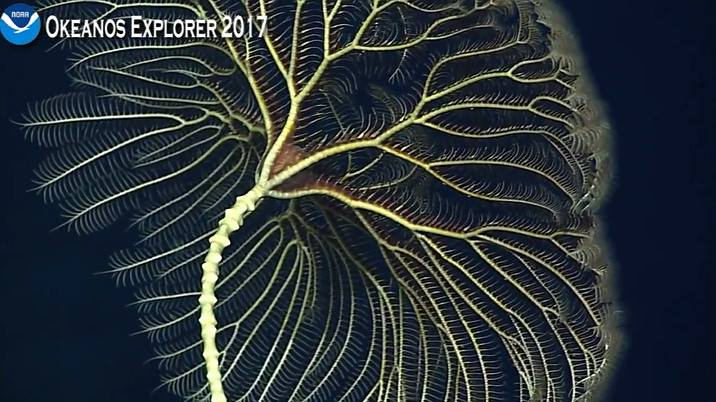

Scientific classification
- Kingdom: Animalia
- Phylum: Echinodermata
- Class: Crinoidea
- Superorder: Articulata
- Order: Comatulida
- Suborder: Bourgueticrinina
- Family: Phrynocrinidae; A.H. Clark, 1907

= Phrynocrinidae =

Family of crinoids

Phrynocrinidae is a family of echinoderms belonging to the order Comatulida.

Genera:

- Phrynocrinus Clark, 1907
- Porphyrocrinus Gislén, 1925
