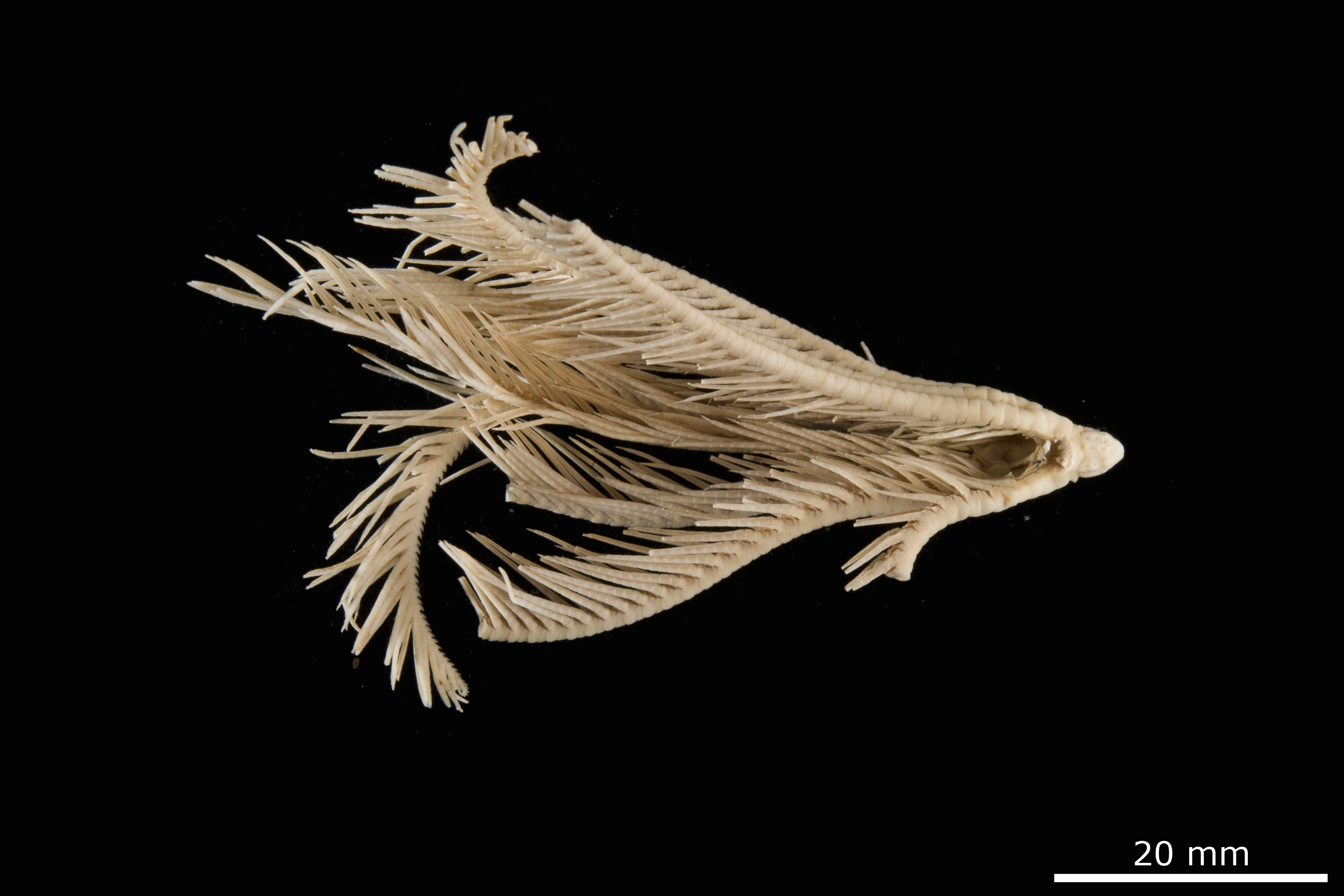
- Asterometra lepida

Scientific classification
- Kingdom: Animalia
- Phylum: Echinodermata
- Class: Crinoidea
- Superorder: Articulata
- Order: Comatulida
- Superfamily: Tropiometroidea
- Family: Asterometridae; Gislén, 1924

= Asterometridae =

Family of echinoderms

Asterometridae is a family of echinoderms belonging to the order Comatulida.

Genera:

- Asterometra Clark, 1907
- Pterometra Clark, 1909
- Sinometra Yulin, 1984
