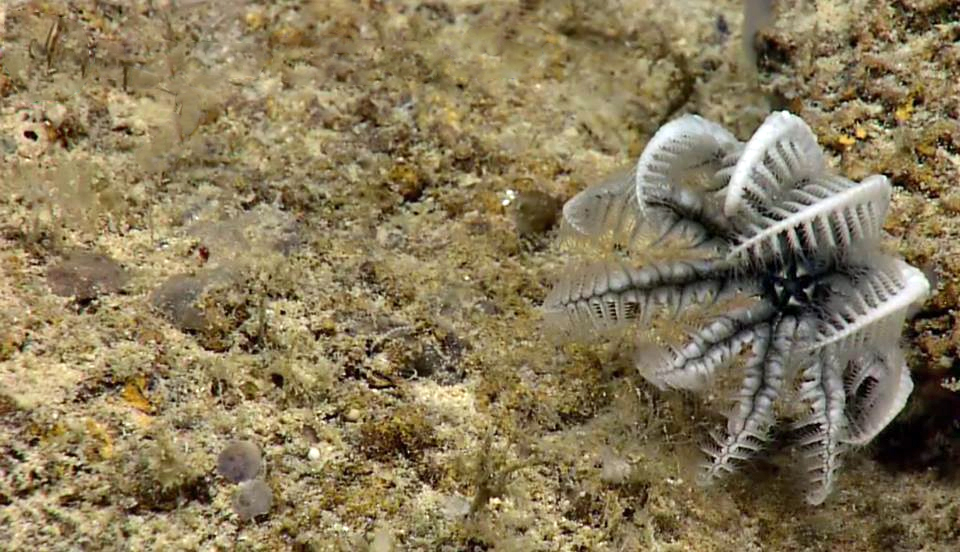
- Holopus sp.

Scientific classification
- Kingdom: Animalia
- Phylum: Echinodermata
- Class: Crinoidea
- Subclass: Articulata
- Order: Cyrtocrinida; Sieverts-Doreck, 1952

= Cyrtocrinida =

Order of crinoids

Cyrtocrinida is an order of sea lilies which contains two suborders and three families.

== Characteristics ==
Members of this order have stems consisting of a single skeletal unit or a very small number of units. There are no cirri, and the expanded base of the stem attaches directly to the substrate. The calyx may be asymmetrical and consists of five arms attached to five radial ossicles. The arms subdivide at arm ossicle I or II.

Extant species usually live at depths of several hundred meters, but Cyathidium plantei can be found at 200 m (700 ft) deep. A stem in suborder Holopodina is absent. Instead they are attached directly onto the substrate by the base of their calyx.

== Families ==
The World Register of Marine Species includes the following groups in the order:

- Suborder Cyrtocrinina
  - Family Sclerocrinidae Jaekel, 1918
- Suborder Holopodina
  - Family Eudesicrinidae Bather, 1899
  - Family Holopodidae Zittel, 1879
