= Eudesicrinidae =

Scientific classification
- Domain: Eukaryota
- Kingdom: Animalia
- Phylum: Echinodermata
- Class: Crinoidea
- Order: Cyrtocrinida
- Family: Eudesicrinidae; Bather, 1899

Family of echinoderms

Eudesicrinidae is a family of echinoderms belonging to the order Millericrinida.

Genera:

- Eudesicrinus Loriol, 1882
- Proeudesicrinus Améziane-Cominardi & Bourseau, 1990
