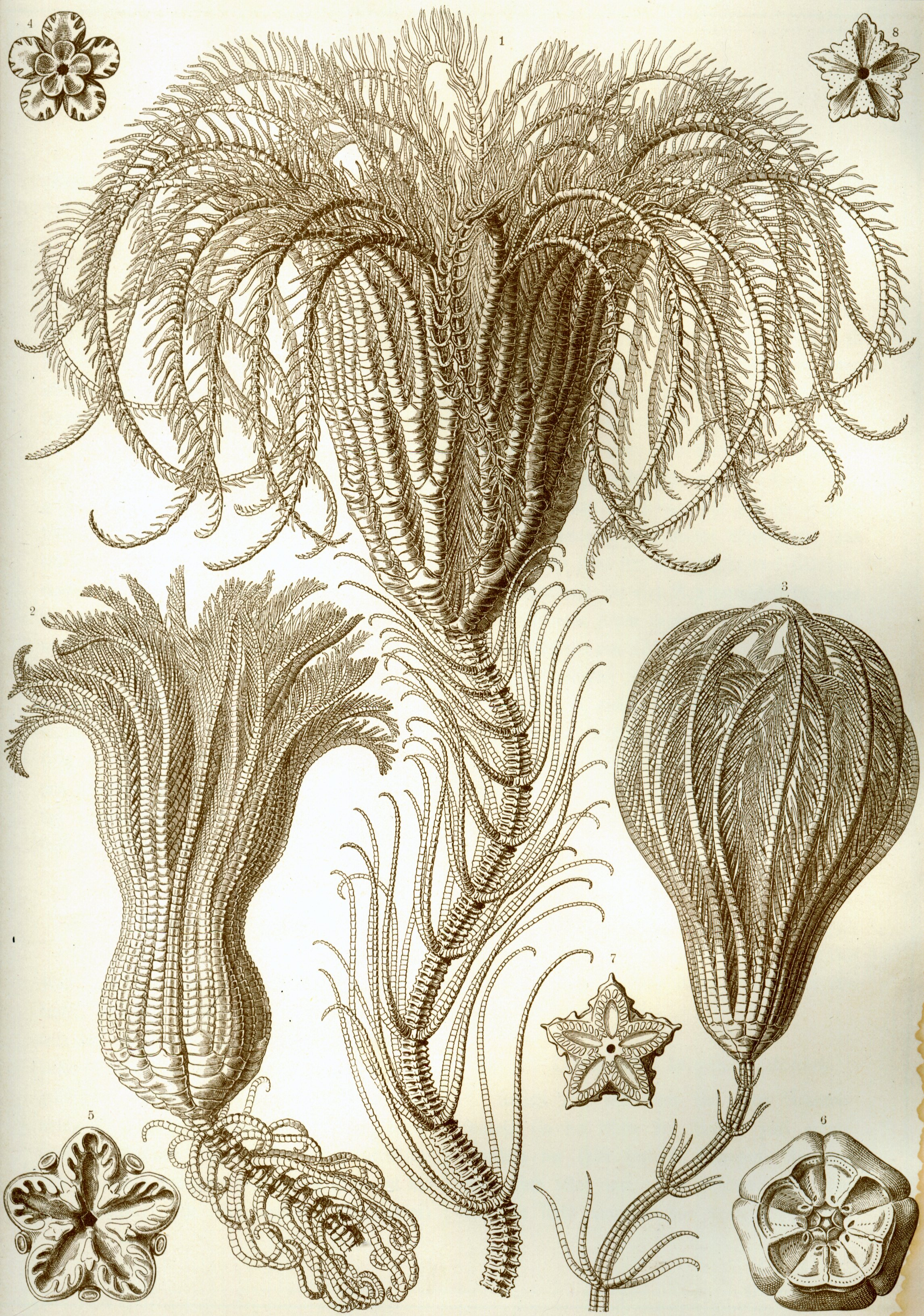
- Drawing of sea lilies by Haeckel

Scientific classification
- Kingdom: Animalia
- Phylum: Echinodermata
- Class: Crinoidea
- Subclass: Articulata
- Order: Bourgueticrinida

Families
- Bathycrinidae; Bourgueticrinidae; Phrynocrinidae; Porphyrocrinidae; Septocrinidae

= Bourgueticrinida =

Order of crinoids

Bourgueticrinida is an order of crinoids that typically live deep in the ocean. Members of this order are attached to the seabed by a slender stalk and are known as sea lilies. While other groups of crinoids flourished during the Permian, bourgueticrinids along with other extant orders did not appear until the Triassic, following a mass extinction event in which nearly all crinoids died out.

== Taxonomy ==
Bourgueticrinida has traditionally been viewed as an order of Articulata and a sister taxon to the order Comatulida, the feather stars. A study published in 2011 suggested that it should be renamed Bourgueticrinina and viewed as a suborder of Comatulida.

== Characteristics ==
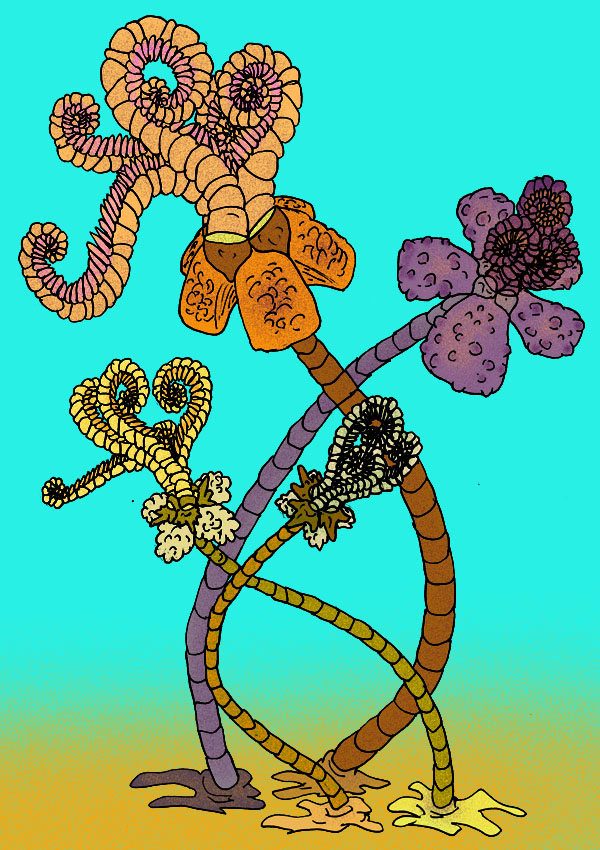
Artist's impression of several crinoids from the Permian of Western Australia

Sea lilies are crinoids with a calyx and five pairs of feather-like arms standing on a long stalk which is retained throughout the animal's life. This stalk is attached to the substrate by means of an enlarged, terminal disc or alternatively by means of several branching, irregular radicular cirri arising from the lowest part of the stem. Although these crinoids are usually sessile, they have been seen to drag themselves across the seabed with the help of their arms. The sea lilies are nearly all found at depths greater than 200 metres (660 ft) although Metacrinus rotundus (a member of a different order) is found off the coast of Japan at a depth of only 100 metres (330 ft).

The ossicles from which the stem is composed are known as columnals. They are discs with a circular, pentagonal, star-shaped or elliptical cross section. The stem is flexible and the columnals are connected to each other with ligaments. At each node where the columnals articulate with each other there may be a whorl of five cirri. These appendages are themselves formed of small ossicles called cirrals and the terminal one is often claw-like. These cirri provide additional anchorage if the stem happens to be in contact with the substrate.

== Evolution ==
The earliest crinoid may have been Echmatocrinus, the fossilised remains of which have been found in the Burgess Shale, but some authorities do not accept it as a crinoid. Bourgueticrinids first appeared in the fossil record during the Triassic period, although other crinoid groups, now extinct, originated in the Ordovician. By the end of the Permian, crinoids were an abundant and very successful group and the columnals are plentiful in many fossiliferous limestone deposits. At that time there were over 6,000 species of sea lily but they were all but extinguished in the Permo-Triassic extinction event. It is believed that only one genus of sea lily survived that occurrence and that all modern crinoids, both the sea lilies and the feather stars, are descended from members of that genus. There are currently about 80 species of bourgueticrinids.
