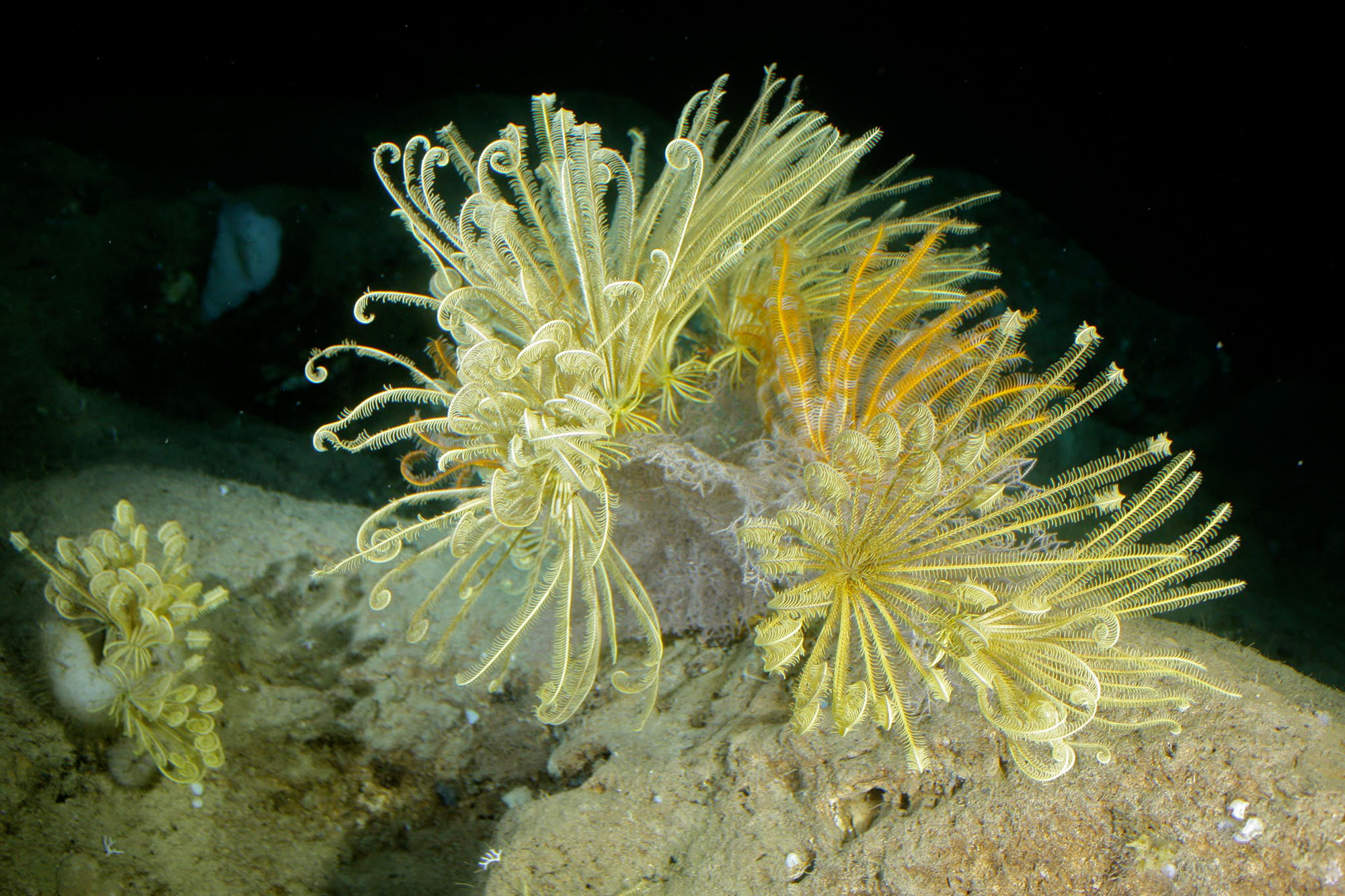

Scientific classification
- Kingdom: Animalia
- Phylum: Echinodermata
- Class: Crinoidea
- Superorder: Articulata
- Order: Comatulida
- Superfamily: Tropiometroidea
- Family: Charitometridae; A.H. Clark, 1909

Genera
- See text

= Charitometridae =

Family of crinoids

Charitometridae is a family of crinoids or feather stars in the phylum Echinodermata.

== Genera ==
The following genera are recognised by the World Register of Marine Species:

- Charitometra AH Clark, 1907
  - Charitometra basicurva (Carpenter, 1888)
  - Charitometra incisa (Carpenter, 1888)
- Chlorometra AH Clark, 1909
  - Chlorometra garrettiana (AH Clark, 1907)
- Chondrometra AH Clark, 1916
  - Chondrometra aculeata (Carpenter, 1888)
  - Chondrometra crosnieri Marshall & Rowe, 1981
  - Chondrometra robusta (AH Clark, 1911)
  - Chondrometra rugosa AH Clark, 1918
- Crinometra AH Clark, 1909
  - Crinometra brevipinna (Pourtalès, 1868)
- Glyptometra AH Clark, 1909
  - Glyptometra angusticalyx (Carpenter, 1884)
  - Glyptometra crassa (AH Clark, 1912)
  - Glyptometra distincta (Carpenter, 1888)
  - Glyptometra inaequalis (Carpenter, 1888)
  - Glyptometra invenusta (AH Clark, 1909)
  - Glyptometra investigatoris (AH Clark, 1909)
  - Glyptometra lata (AH Clark, 1907)
  - Glyptometra lateralis (AH Clark, 1908)
  - Glyptometra levigata (AH Clark, 1909)
  - Glyptometra macilenta (AH Clark, 1909)
  - Glyptometra sclateri (Bell, 1905)
  - Glyptometra septentrionalis (AH Clark, 1911)
  - Glyptometra sparksi (John, 1937)
  - Glyptometra timorensis AH Clark, 1912
  - Glyptometra tuberosa (Carpenter, 1888)
- Monachometra AH Clark, 1916
  - Monachometra flexilis (Carpenter, 1888)
  - Monachometra fragilis (AH Clark, 1912)
  - Monachometra kermadecensis McKnight, 1977
  - Monachometra patula (Carpenter, 1888)
  - Monachometra robusta (Carpenter, 1888)
- Poecilometra AH Clark, 1907
  - Poecilometra acoela (Carpenter, 1888)
  - Poecilometra scalaris (AH Clark, 1907)
- Strotometra AH Clark, 1909
  - Strotometra hepburniana (AH Clark, 1907)
  - Strotometra ornatissimus AH Clark, 1912
  - Strotometra parvipinna (Carpenter, 1888)
  - Strotometra priamus AH Clark, 1912
