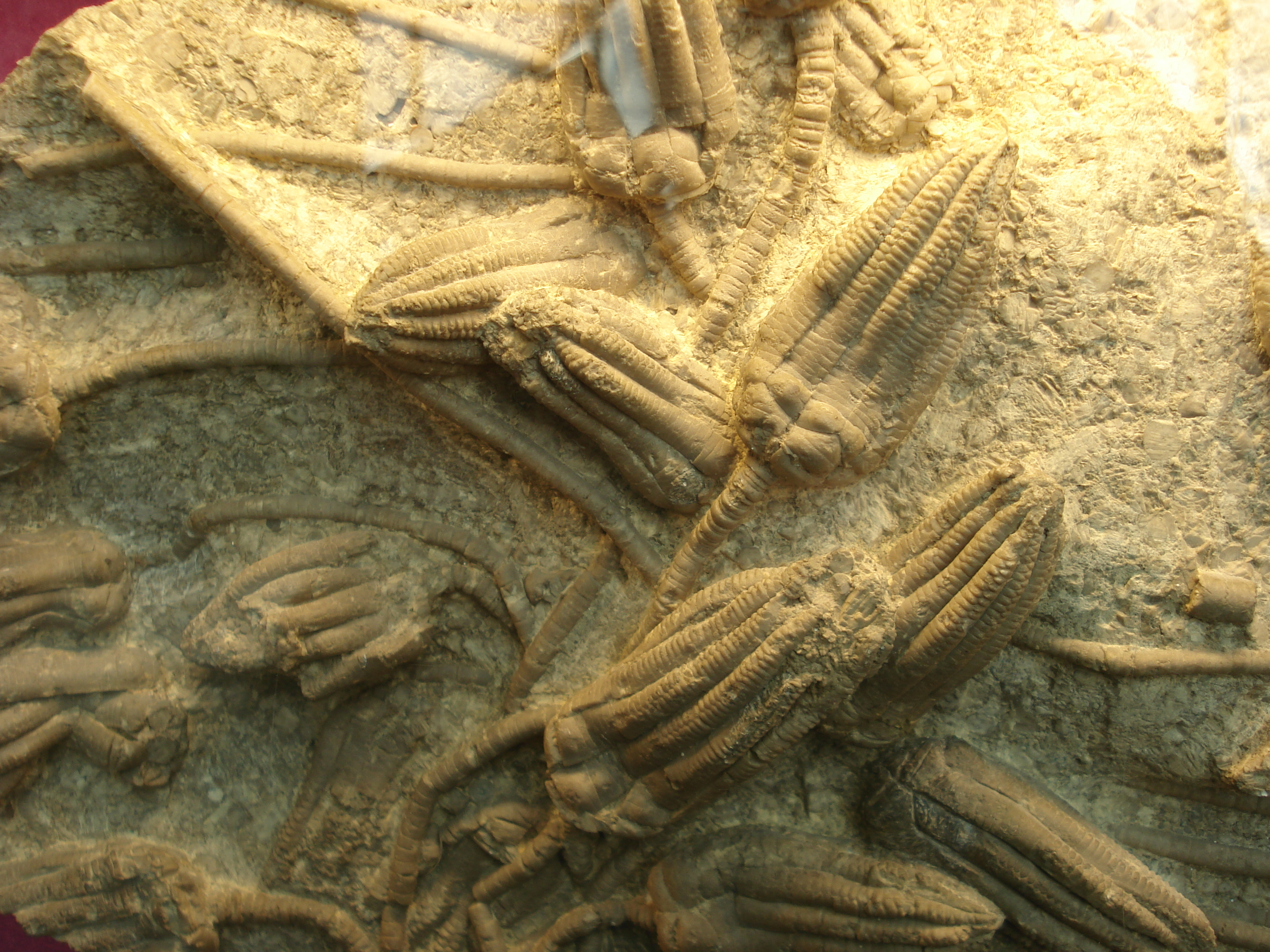
- Encrinus fossils on display at the Paläontologisches Museum München

Scientific classification
- Domain: Eukaryota
- Kingdom: Animalia
- Phylum: Echinodermata
- Class: Crinoidea
- Order: †Encrinida
- Family: †Encrinidae
- Genus: †Encrinus; Andreae, 1764

= Encrinus =

Encrinus Temporal range: Late Silurian-Late Triassic, 428.2–215.6 Ma

Extinct genus of crinoids

Encrinus is an extinct genus of crinoids, and "one of the most famous". It lived during the Late Silurian-Late Triassic, and its fossils have been found in Europe.

== History ==
Fossils of Encrinus went by several names in Germany before the establishment of modern paleontology. In Lower Saxony, they were called Sonnenräder ("sun wheels"), while in Thuringia and Hesse they were called Bonifatiuspfennige ("Saint Boniface's pennies"). In southwestern Germany, they went by Hexengeld ("witches' money"). The animal was correctly reconstructed for the first time in 1729, although various parts of the animal had been described before that.

Encrinus was described in 1764 by Johann Gerhard Reinhard Andreae. It was assigned to the order Encrinida by Jack Sepkoski in 2002.

== Description ==
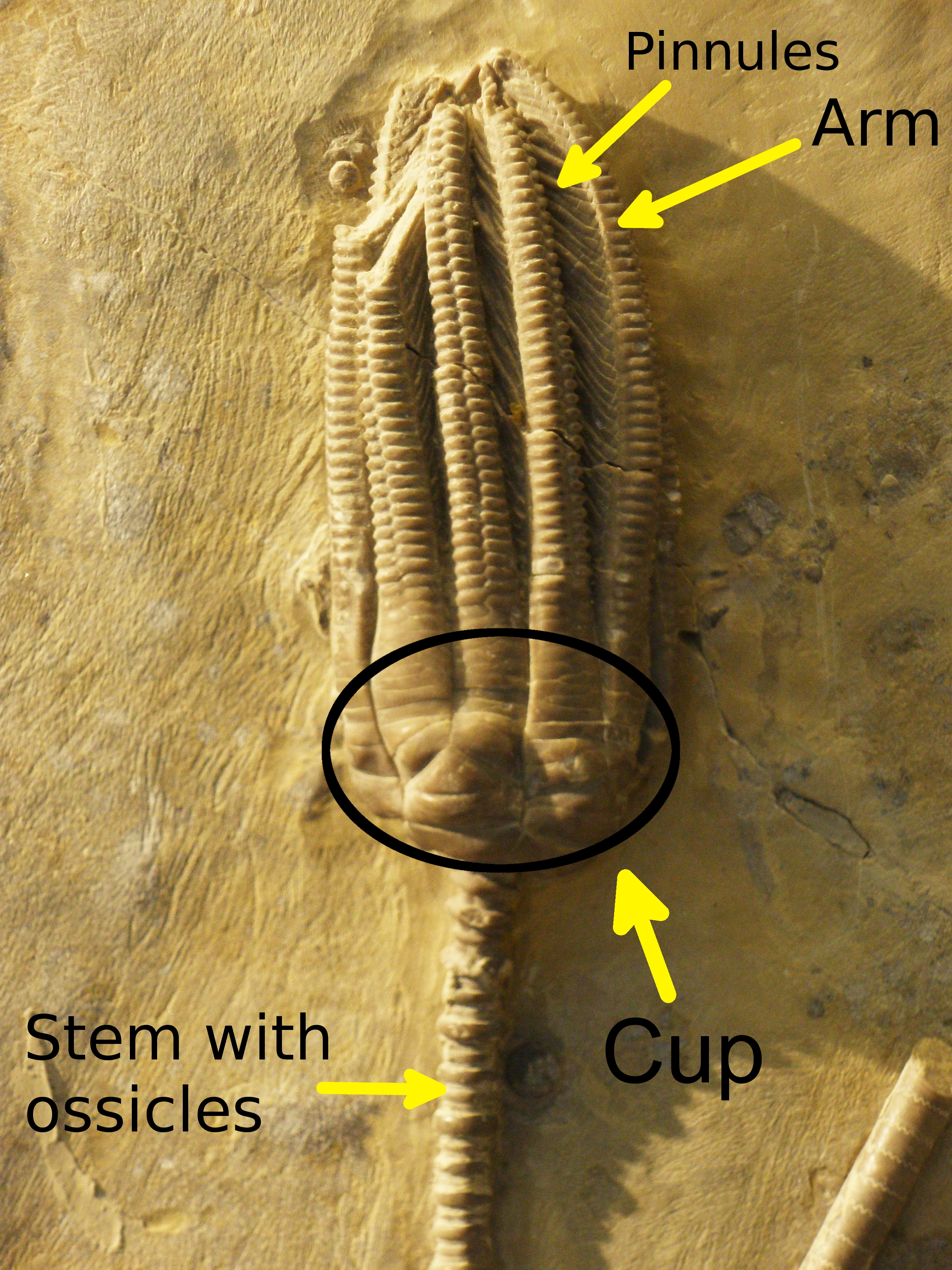
E. liliiformis with parts labeled, based on Douglas et al. 2009

Encrinus possessed a large cup- or crown-like structure at the top of its body, which has been described as resembling "an unopened tulip." This "cup" could be between 1.5 inches (3.8 cm) and 2.25 inches (5.7 cm) long. The structure displayed "five-fold symmetry" and had a slightly concave base. It bore ten arms (although in some species, such as E. carnallis, it bore 20), which in turn bore many small branches (pinnules). When opened, the arms and pinnules formed a kind of "feeding fan", used to catch prey such as plankton. "Microscopic interpinnular channels" suggest that Encrinus may have been an active filter feeder, creating its own currents by beating its cilia. It is known that the arms could shut tightly in life (most Encrinus fossils are found in this position), but it is difficult to estimate the greatest angle at which they could open. It is possible that specimens recorded as being widest open demonstrate the normal angle of opening in life. A tegmen ("small leathery dome") covered the mouth and topped the cup. Any particles of food that the animal caught would be passed down the arms and below the tegmen via grooves, eventually leading to cilia, which in turn led to the mouth. When viewed from above, the stem was circular in shape. Large and small ossicles covered the stem, creating a pattern of frequent small ossicles sandwiched between the large ones. The stem did not possess any cirri, and may have been held in place by roots of some sort. The breakage of the stem during the animal's life was a common occurrence, and it often survived long enough to form a new end on its shortened stem. Being from the Middle Triassic, Encrinus is the last known from its group of crinoids, as most others died out during the Permian–Triassic extinction event.
