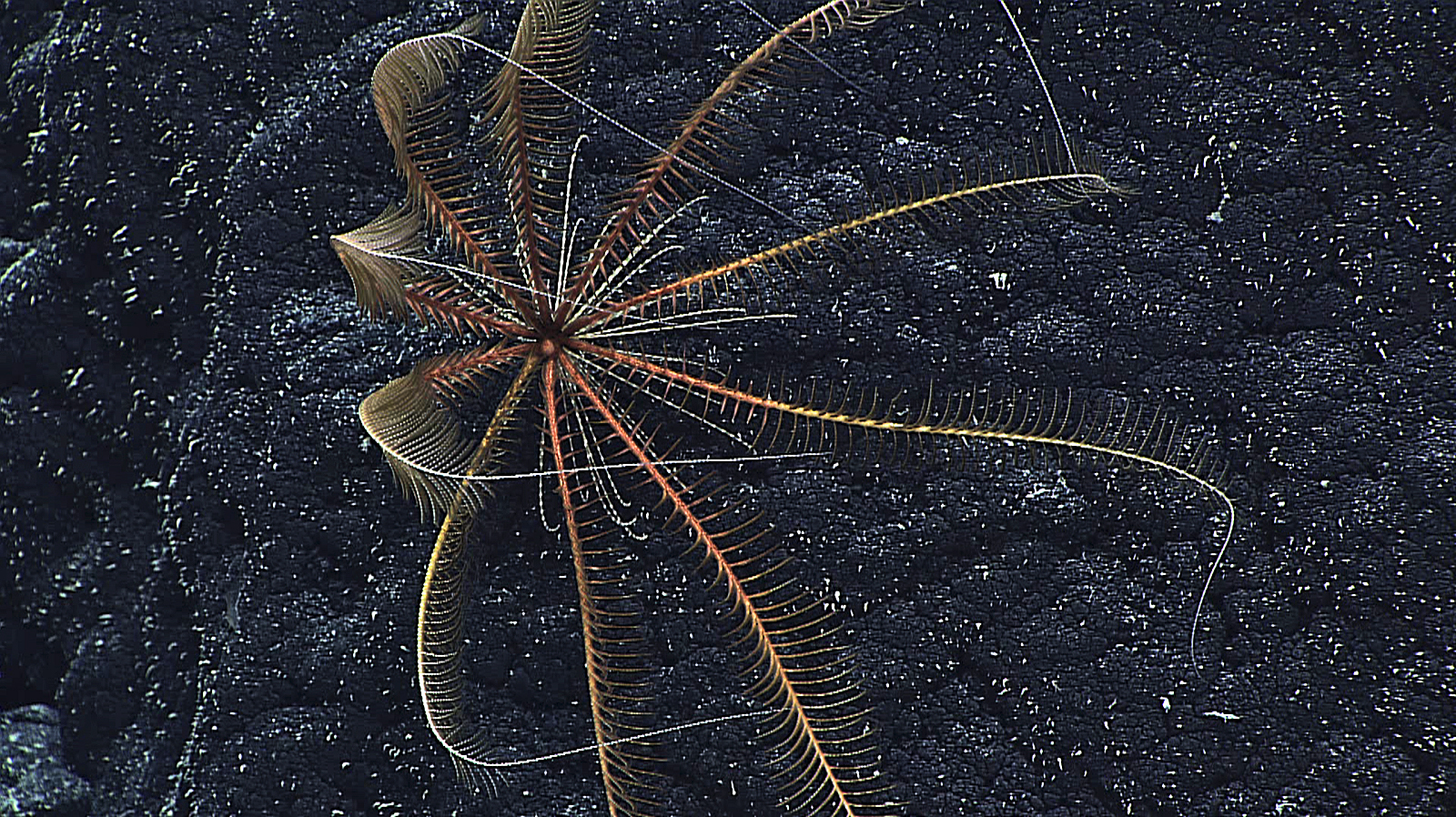
- Paratelecrinus conifer

Scientific classification
- Kingdom: Animalia
- Phylum: Echinodermata
- Class: Crinoidea
- Order: Comatulida
- Suborder: Bourgueticrinina
- Family: Atelecrinidae; Bather, 1899

= Atelecrinidae =

Family of crinoids

Atelecrinidae is a family of crinoids or feather stars in the phylum Echinodermata. It was first described by Francis Arthur Bather in 1899.

== Genera ==
The following genera are in the family Atelecrinidae:

- Adelatelecrinus Messing, 2013
- Atelecrinus Carpenter, 1881
- Paratelecrinus Messing, 2013
- Sibogacrinus A. H. Clark (in A.H. Clark & A. M. Clark), 1967
