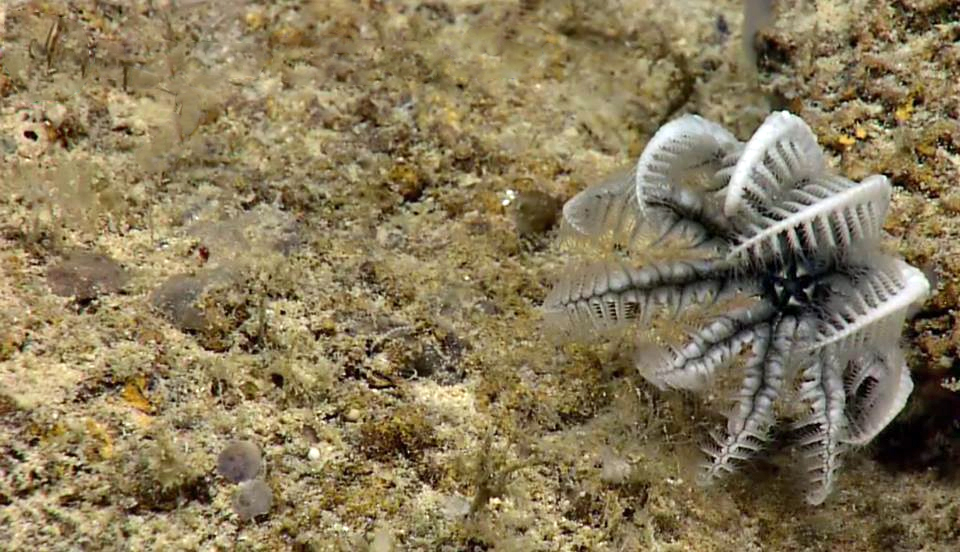

Scientific classification
- Domain: Eukaryota
- Kingdom: Animalia
- Phylum: Echinodermata
- Class: Crinoidea
- Order: Cyrtocrinida
- Family: Holopodidae
- Genus: Holopus; Orbigny, 1837

= Holopus =

Genus of echinoderms

Holopus is a genus of echinoderms belonging to the family Holopodidae.

The species of this genus are found in Central America and the Pacific Ocean (near Australia).

Species:

- Holopus alidis Bourseau, Améziane-Cominardi, Avocat & Roux, 1991
- Holopus mikihe Donovan & Pawson, 2008
- Holopus rangii Orbigny, 1837
