= Ailsacrinus =

Ailsacrinus Temporal range: Middle Jurassic

Scientific classification
- Kingdom: Animalia
- Phylum: Echinodermata
- Class: Crinoidea
- Order: Millericrinida
- Genus: †Ailsacrinus

Extinct genus of crinoids

Ailsacrinus is an extinct genus of crinoid from the Middle Jurassic of Europe.
