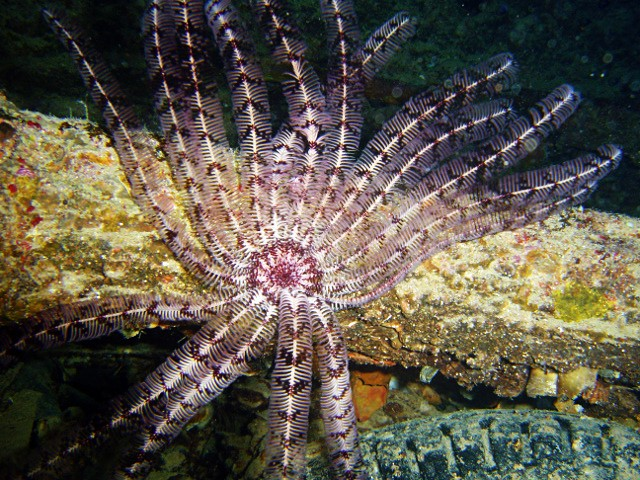

Scientific classification
- Kingdom: Animalia
- Phylum: Echinodermata
- Class: Crinoidea
- Superorder: Articulata
- Order: Comatulida
- Superfamily: Himerometroidea
- Family: Mariametridae; A.H. Clark, 1909

= Mariametridae =

Family of echinoderms

Mariametridae is a family of echinoderms belonging to the order Comatulida.

Genera:

- Dichrometra Clark, 1909
- Lamprometra Clark, 1913
- Mariametra Clark, 1909
- Oxymetra Clark, 1909
- Pelometra Clark, 1941
- Stephanometra Clark, 1909
