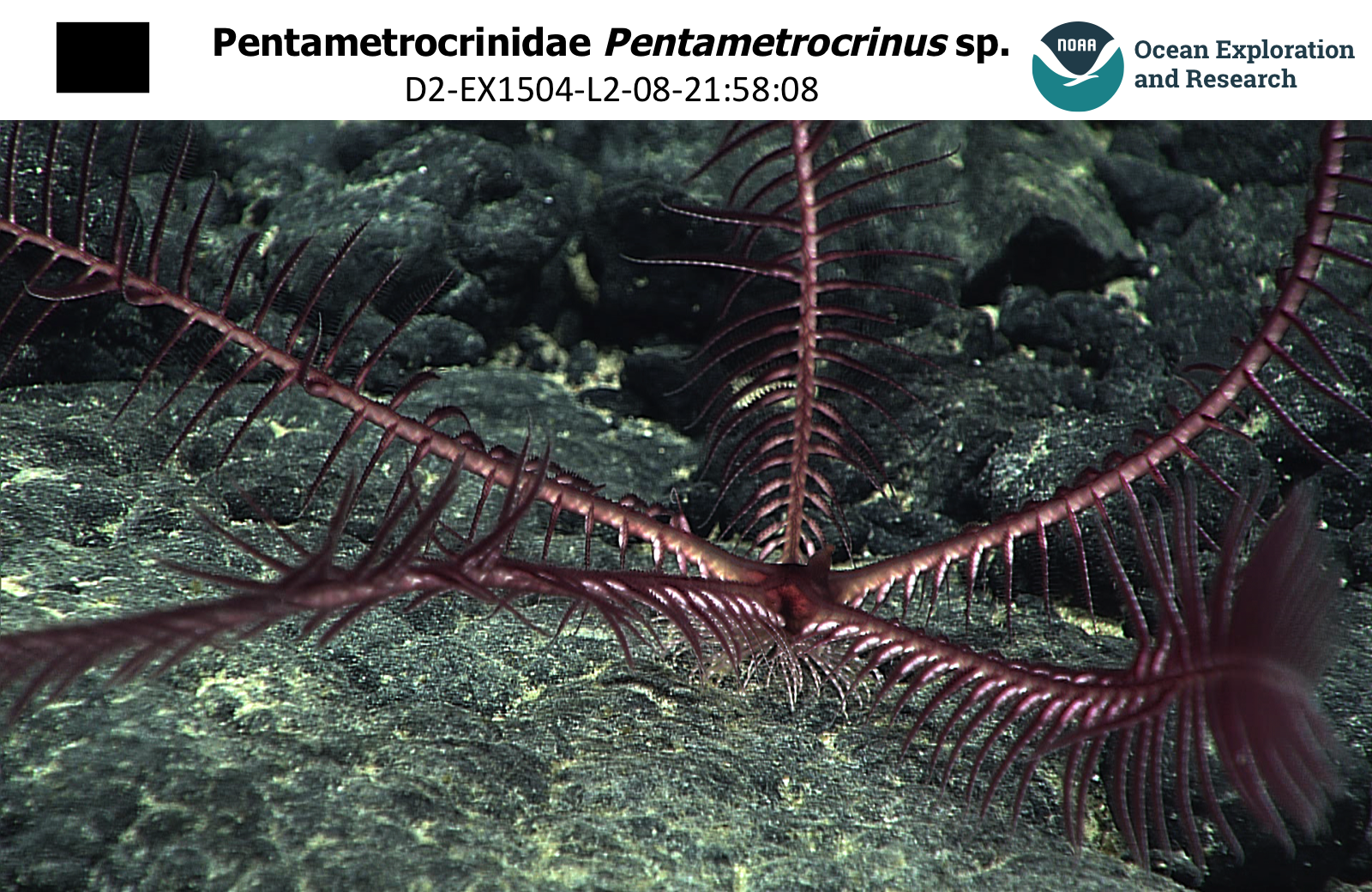

Scientific classification
- Domain: Eukaryota
- Kingdom: Animalia
- Phylum: Echinodermata
- Class: Crinoidea
- Order: Comatulida
- Superfamily: Antedonoidea
- Family: Pentametrocrinidae

= Pentametrocrinidae =

Family of echinoderms

Pentametrocrinidae is a family of echinoderms belonging to the order Comatulida.

Genera:

- Pentametrocrinus Clark, 1908
- Thaumatocrinus Carpenter, 1883
