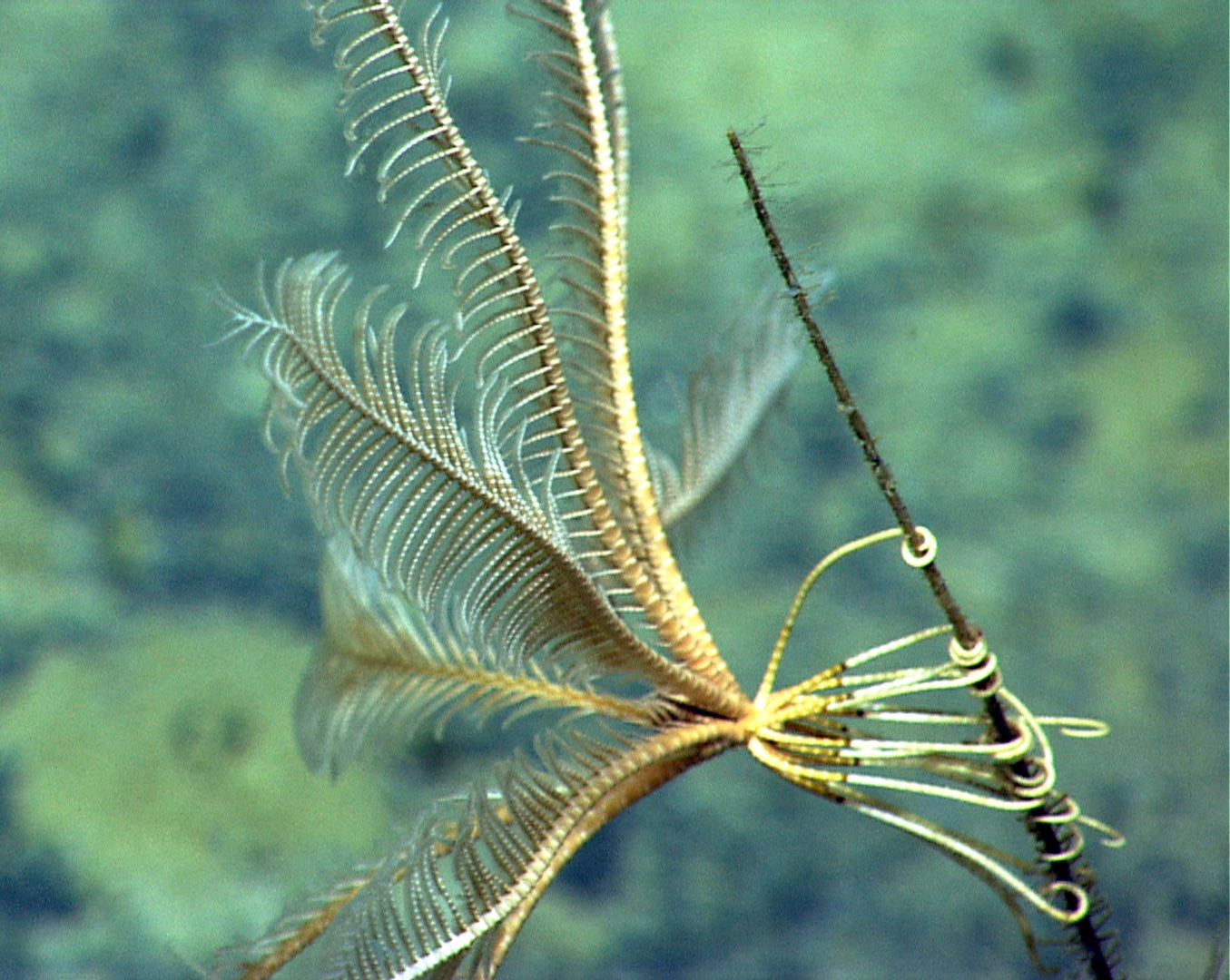

Scientific classification
- Kingdom: Animalia
- Phylum: Echinodermata
- Class: Crinoidea
- Superorder: Articulata
- Order: Comatulida
- Superfamily: Tropiometroidea
- Family: Thalassometridae; A.H. Clark, 1908

= Thalassometridae =

Family of echinoderms

Thalassometridae is a family of echinoderms belonging to the order Comatulida.

== Genera ==
Genera:

- Aglaometra Clark, 1913
- Cosmiometra Clark, 1909
- Crotalometra Clark, 1909
- Daidalometra Clark, 1916
- Horaeometra Clark, 1918
- Koehlermetra Clark, 1950
- Leilametra Clark, 1932
- Lissometra Clark, 1918
- Oceanometra Clark, 1916
- Parametra Clark, 1909
- Stenometra Clark, 1909
- Stiremetra Clark, 1909
- Stylometra Clark, 1908
- Thalassometra Clark, 1907
