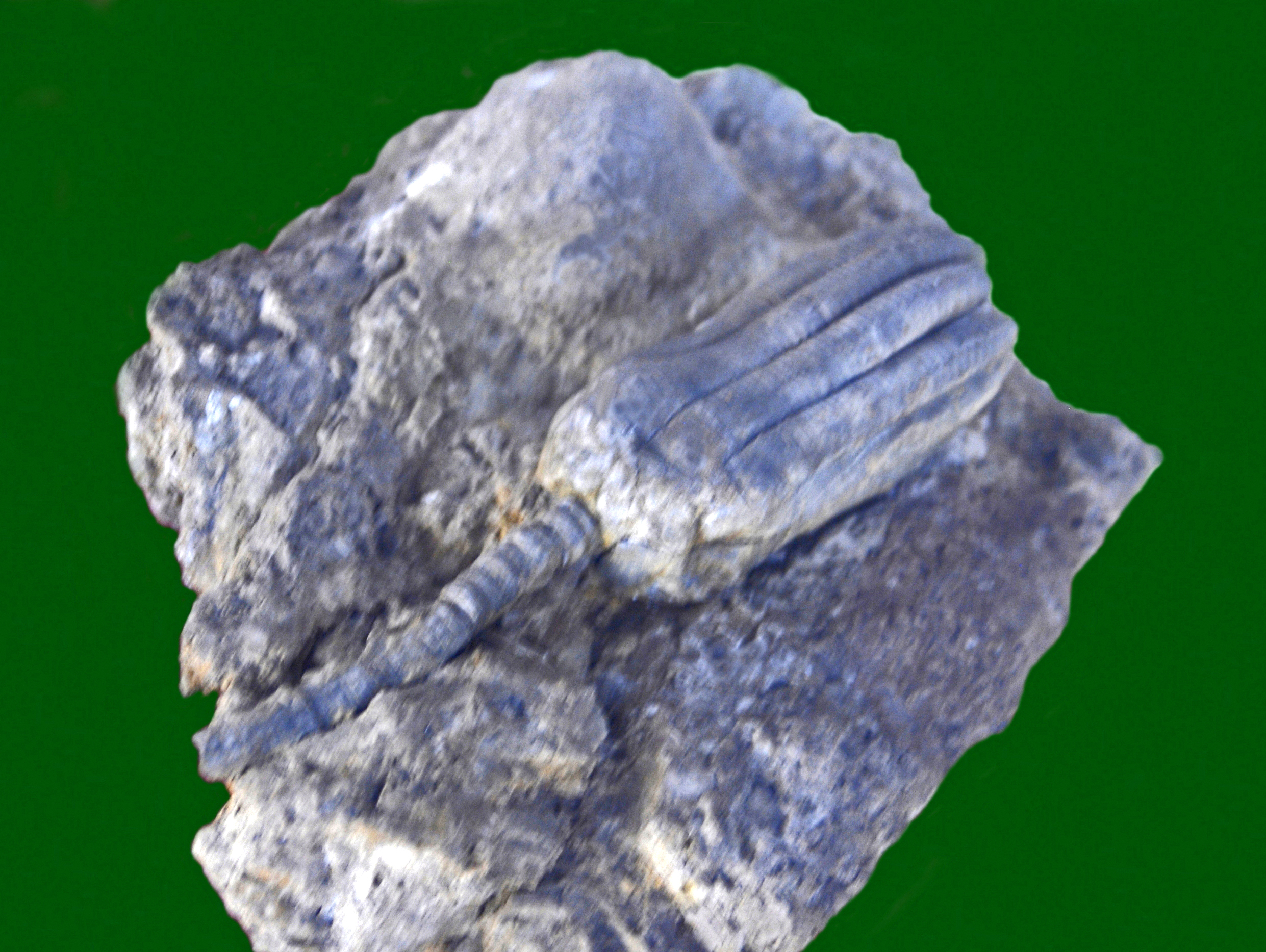
- Fossil specimens of Encrinus liliformis from United Kingdom, on display at Galerie de paléontologie et d'anatomie comparée in Paris

Scientific classification
- Domain: Eukaryota
- Kingdom: Animalia
- Phylum: Echinodermata
- Class: Crinoidea
- Order: †Encrinida
- Family: †Encrinidae; Dujardin and Hupé

= Encrinidae =

Encrinidae Temporal range: Silurian–Triassic

Extinct family of crinoids

Encrinidae is an extinct family of crinoids belonging to the order Encrinida.

These stationary epifaunal suspension feeders lived during the Silurian-Triassic periods. Fossils of this family have been found in the sediments of Austria, China, Germany, Hungary, Italy, New Zealand, Poland, Spain, Switzerland and, United States.

== Genera ==
- Carnallicrinus
- Cassianocrinus
- Chelocrinus
- Encrinus
- Zardinicrinus
