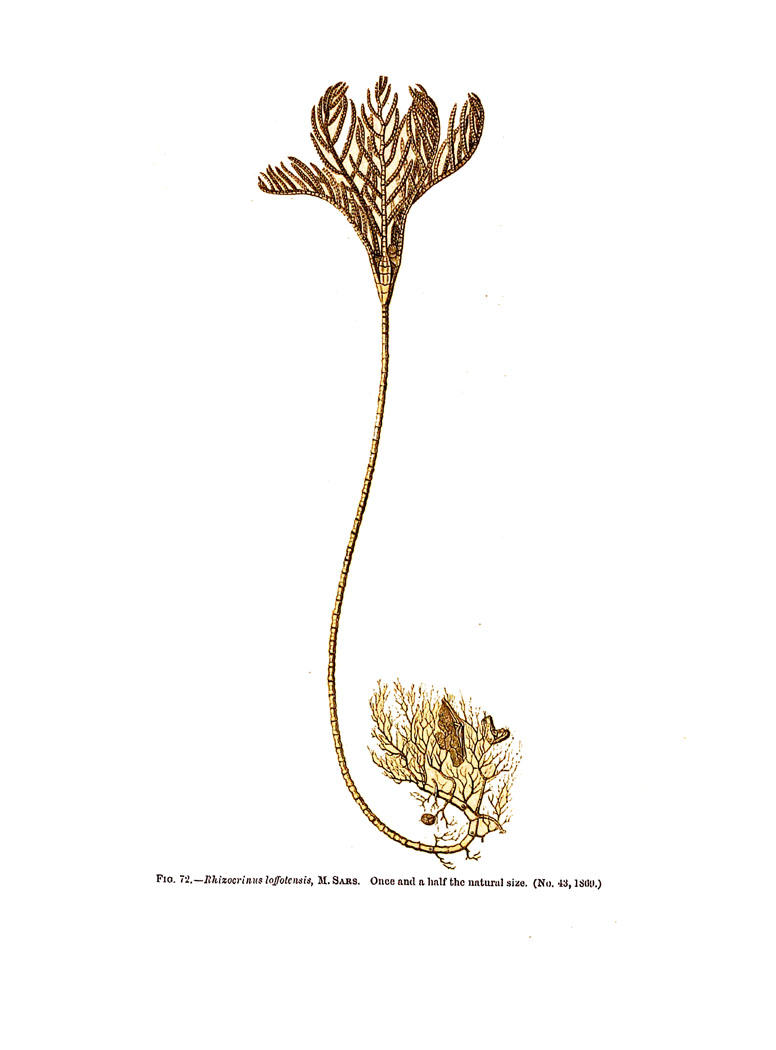
- Illustration of Conocrinus lofotensis

Scientific classification
- Kingdom: Animalia
- Phylum: Echinodermata
- Class: Crinoidea
- Order: Comatulida
- Suborder: Bourgueticrinina
- Family: Bourgueticrinidae; Loriol, 1882

= Bourgueticrinidae =

Family of crinoids

Bourgueticrinidae is a family of crinoids, containing 2 genera.

== Genera ==
- Conocrinus d'Orbigny, 1850
- Democrinus Perrier, 1883
