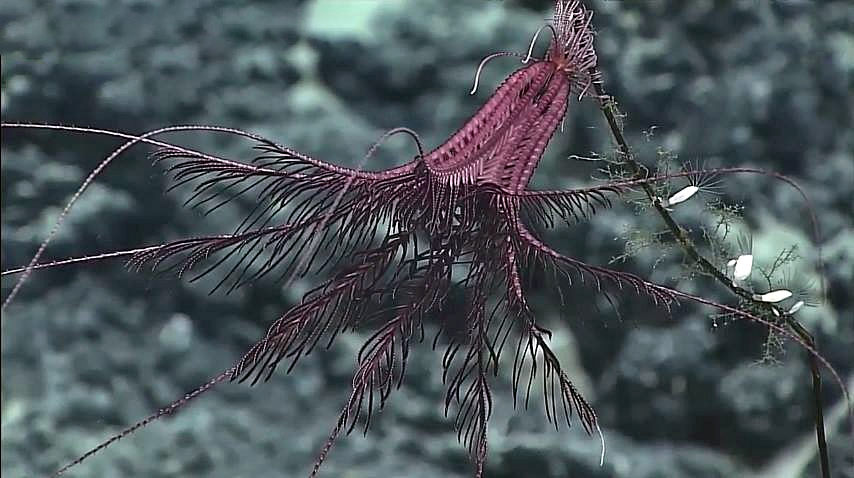

Scientific classification
- Domain: Eukaryota
- Kingdom: Animalia
- Phylum: Echinodermata
- Class: Crinoidea
- Order: Comatulida
- Superfamily: Antedonoidea
- Family: Zenometridae; Clark, 1909

= Zenometridae =

Family of echinoderms

Zenometridae is a family of echinoderms belonging to the order Comatulida.

Genera:

- Psathyrometra Clark, 1907
- Sarametra Clark, 1917
- Zenometra Clark, 1907
