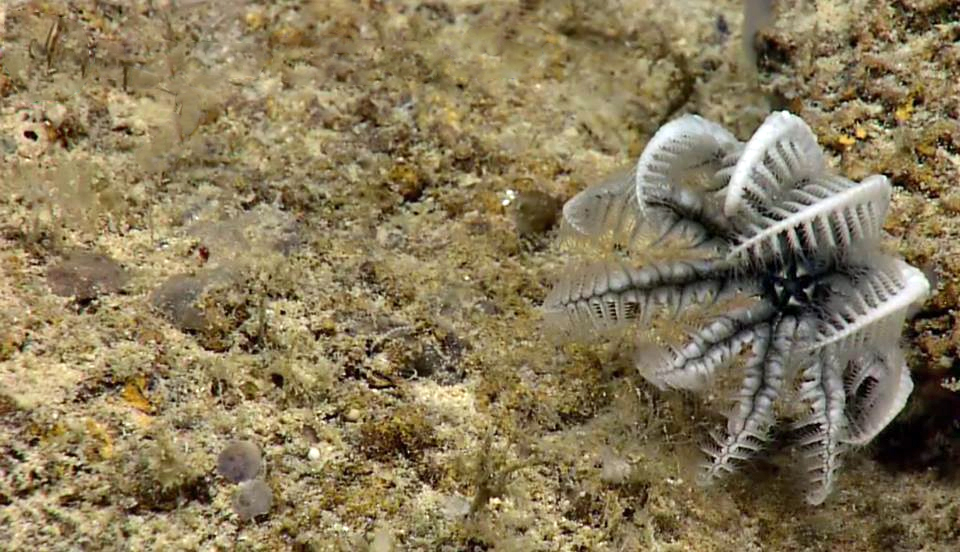

Scientific classification
- Domain: Eukaryota
- Kingdom: Animalia
- Phylum: Echinodermata
- Class: Crinoidea
- Order: Cyrtocrinida
- Family: Holopodidae

= Holopodidae =

Family of echinoderms

Holopodidae is a family of echinoderms belonging to the order Cyrtocrinida.

Genera:

- Cyathidium Steenstrup, 1847
- Holopus Orbigny, 1837
