= Septocrinidae =

Scientific classification
- Domain: Eukaryota
- Kingdom: Animalia
- Phylum: Echinodermata
- Class: Crinoidea
- Order: Comatulida
- Family: Septocrinidae; Mironov, 2000

Family of echinoderms

Septocrinidae is a family of echinoderms belonging to the order Comatulida.

Genera:

- Rouxicrinus Mironov & Pawson, 2010
- Septocrinus Mironov, 2000
- Zeuctocrinus Clark, 1973
