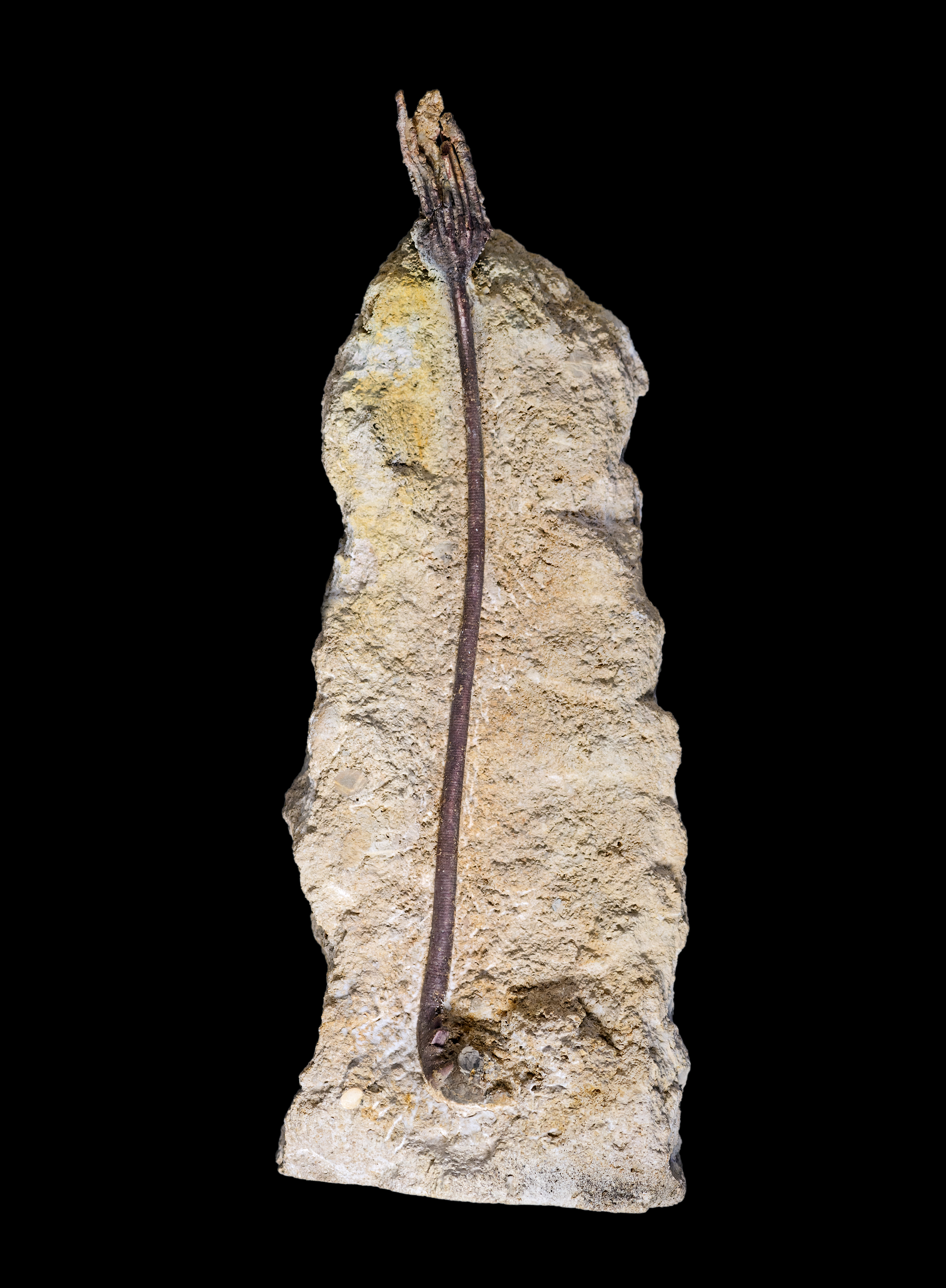
- Liliocrinus polydactylus

Scientific classification
- Kingdom: Animalia
- Phylum: Echinodermata
- Class: Crinoidea
- Subclass: Articulata
- Order: Millericrinida

= Millericrinida =

Millericrinida Temporal range: Anisian–Late Cretaceous

Extinct order of crinoids

Millericrinida is an order of articulate crinoids that originated in the Anisian (Middle Triassic).
