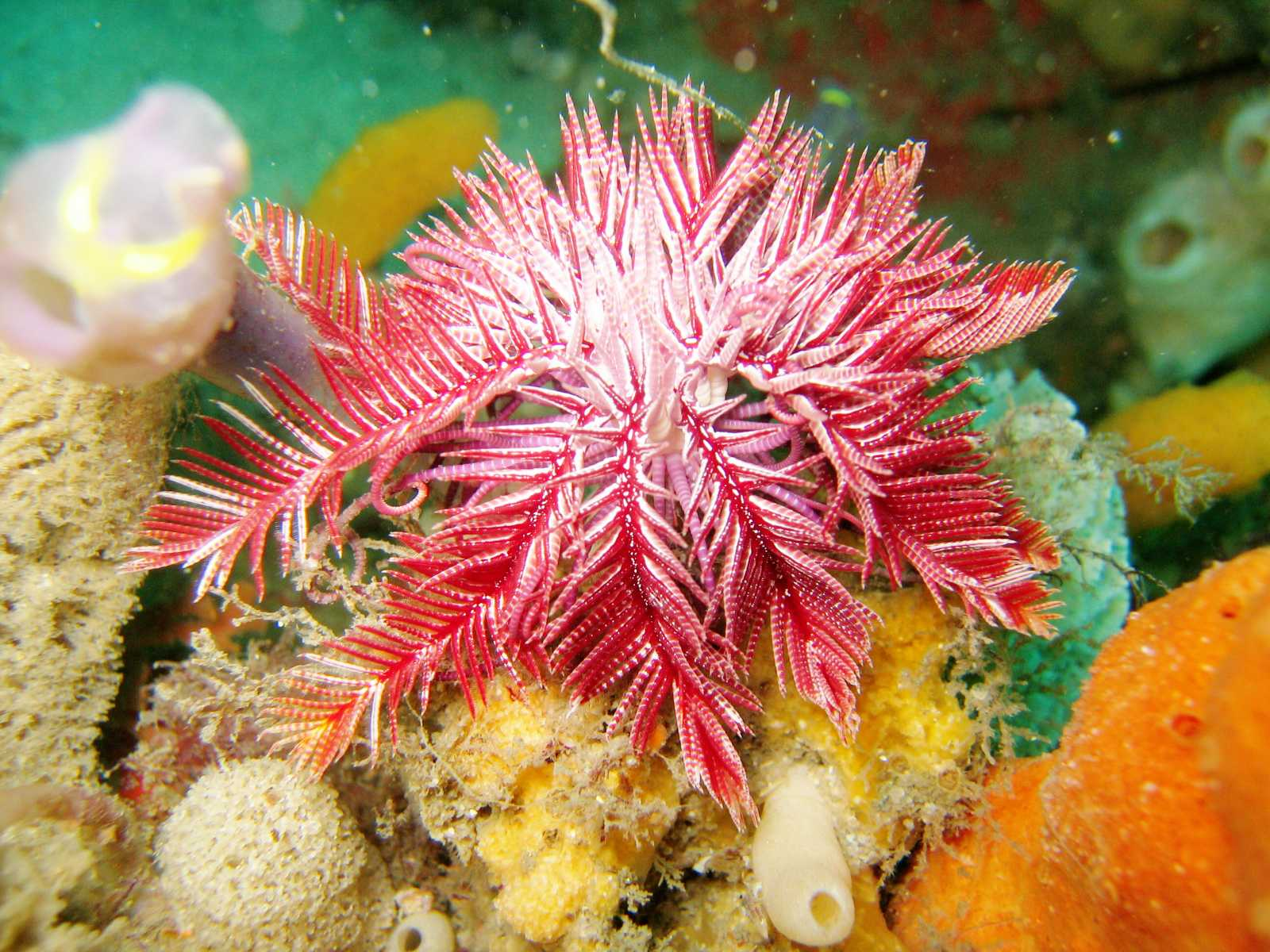
- A passion flower feather star (Ptilometra australis)

Scientific classification
- Kingdom: Animalia
- Phylum: Echinodermata
- Class: Crinoidea
- Subclass: Articulata

Orders
- Comatulida; Cyrtocrinida; Hyocrinida; Isocrinida; †Encrinida; †Holocrinida; †Millericrinida; †Roveacrinida; †Uintacrinida

= Articulata (Crinoidea) =

Articulata Temporal range: Triassic–recent

Subclass of crinoids

Articulata are a subclass or superorder within the class Crinoidea, including all living crinoid species. They are commonly known as sea lilies (stalked crinoids) or feather stars (unstalked crinoids). The Articulata are differentiated from the extinct subclasses by their lack of an anal plate in the adult stage and the presence of an entoneural system. Articulata first appeared in the fossil record during the Triassic period although other, now extinct crinoid groups, originated in the Ordovician.

== Characteristics ==
Articulata exhibit pentamerous symmetry. The stalk, which consists of numerous disks held together by ligaments, supports a calyx or cup made of circlets of calcerous plates. In Comatulids, the stalk develops following the larval stage, but the juveniles shed all but the topmost disk to take up a free-living existence. Five often branched arms, which consist of articulated series of ossicles, extend from the oral plate and form the food-capture mechanism of Articulata. The arms of Articulata are pinnulate in that they have alternating pinnules branching out along them to effectively increase the surface area for feeding. These pinnules all have ciliated ambulacral grooves that converge to form larger grooves in the arms that lead down to the mouth located beside the anus on the upper surface of the oral plate.

Articulata are passive suspension feeders. They capture algae with triplets of tube feet located on the pinnules, and the ciliated ambulacral canals transport this algae to the mouth. Although they are passive feeders, some Articulata have been observed to move to better feeding areas either with locomotory mechanisms at the base of the stalk or by detaching and pulling themselves with their arms. As of 2004, there are 540 described species of living Articulata that fall into two major orders. The bourgueticrinids which have the traditional stalked body form account for about 15% percent of the known species while the comatulids are unstalked and account for most of the rest.

== Classification ==
According to the World Register of Marine Species, Articulata includes the following families:

- order Comatulida Clark, 1908
  - super-family Antedonoidea Norman, 1865
    - family Antedonidae Norman, 1865
    - family Pentametrocrinidae AH Clark, 1908
    - family Zenometridae AH Clark, 1909
  - super-family Atelecrinoidea Bather, 1899
    - family Atelecrinidae Bather, 1899
  - super-family Comatuloidea Fleming, 1828
    - family Comatulidae Fleming, 1828
  - super-family Himerometroidea AH Clark, 1908
    - family Colobometridae AH Clark, 1909
    - family Eudiocrinidae AH Clark, 1907
    - family Himerometridae AH Clark, 1907
    - family Mariametridae AH Clark, 1909
    - family Zygometridae AH Clark, 1908
  - super-family Notocrinoidea Mortensen, 1918
    - family Aporometridae HL Clark, 1938
    - family Notocrinidae Mortensen, 1918
  - super-family †Paracomatuloidea Hess, 1951
  - super-family Tropiometroidea AH Clark, 1908
    - family Asterometridae Gislén, 1924
    - family Calometridae AH Clark, 1911
    - family Charitometridae AH Clark, 1909
    - family Ptilometridae AH Clark, 1914
    - family Thalassometridae AH Clark, 1908
    - family Tropiometridae AH Clark, 1908
  - Comatulida incertae sedis
    - family Atopocrinidae Messing, 2011 (in Hess & Messing, 2011)
    - family Bathycrinidae Bather, 1899
    - family Bourgueticrinidae Loriol, 1882
    - family Guillecrinidae Mironov & Sorokina, 1998
    - family Phrynocrinidae AH Clark, 1907
    - family Septocrinidae Mironov, 2000
- order Cyrtocrinida
  - Sub-order Cyrtocrinina
    - family Sclerocrinidae Jaekel, 1918
  - Sub-order Holopodina
    - family Eudesicrinidae Bather, 1899
    - family Holopodidae Zittel, 1879
- order †Encrinida
  - family †Encrinidae
- order Hyocrinida
  - family Hyocrinidae Carpenter, 1884
- order Isocrinida
  - Sub-order Isocrinina
    - family Cainocrinidae Simms, 1988
    - family Isocrinidae Gislén, 1924
    - family Isselicrinidae Klikushkin, 1977
    - family Proisocrinidae Rasmussen, 1978
  - Sub-order †Pentacrinitina
    - family †Pentacrinitidae Gray, 1842
- order †Millericrinida
