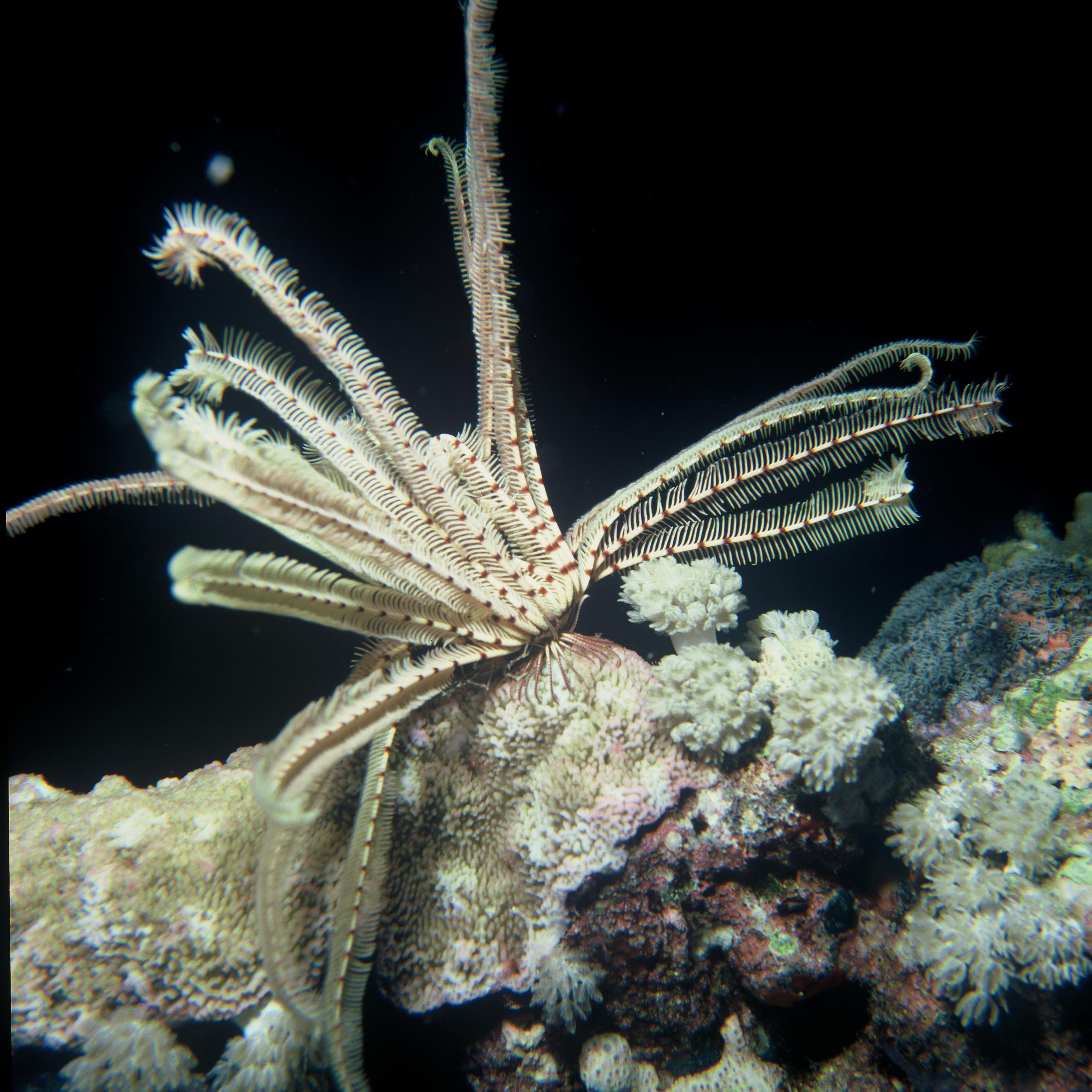
- Lamprometra palmata

Scientific classification
- Kingdom: Animalia
- Phylum: Echinodermata
- Class: Crinoidea
- Subclass: Articulata
- Order: Comatulida

= Comatulida =

Comatulida Temporal range: Triassic–recent

Order of crinoids

Comatulida is an order of crinoids. Members of this order are known as feather stars and mostly do not have a stalk as adults. The oral surface with the mouth is facing upwards and is surrounded by five, often divided rays with feathery pinnules. Comatulids live on the seabed and on reefs in tropical and temperate waters.

== Taxonomy ==
Bourgueticrinida, the sea lilies, has traditionally been viewed as an order of Articulata and a sister taxon to Comatulida. A study published in 2011 suggested that it should be renamed Bourgueticrinina and viewed as a suborder of Comatulida.

== Characteristics ==
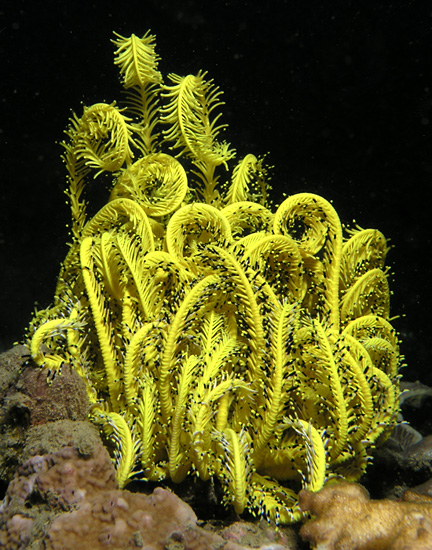
Comaster schlegelii from East Timor

Like other echinoderms, adult comatulids have pentamerous (five-sided) symmetry, while the larvae have bilateral symmetry. Late in their development, the larvae are attached to the seabed by a stalk, but during metamorphosis the juvenile crinoids detach and are free living. The body has an endoskeleton made from a number of articulated calcareous plates known as ossicles, covered by a thin epidermis. Shaped like a cup (the calyx) with a lid (the tegmen), it has a central mouth and an anus near the edge, connected by a U-shaped gut. There is a ring of clawlike appendages (the cirri) near the base of the aboral underside; these grip the substrate to keep the feather star in place.

There are five long, often branched, rays attached round the edge of the tegmen. Each of these is further subdivided into branchlets (the pinnules). Most comatulids originally have 10 arms, each ray being subdivided once. The arms are fragile, and if one is broken off, at least two grow in its place; in this way the number of arms can increase. The arms are composed of articulating ossicles held together by ligaments, and the pinnules have a similar structure. The arms are very flexible and can be spread widely or coiled up. An ambulacral groove starts on each pinnule and joins with others to form grooves on the arms all leading to grooves on the tegmen ending at the mouth. These food-collecting grooves are overhung by calcareous plates (the lappets) and have a lining of fine cilia.

== Behavior ==
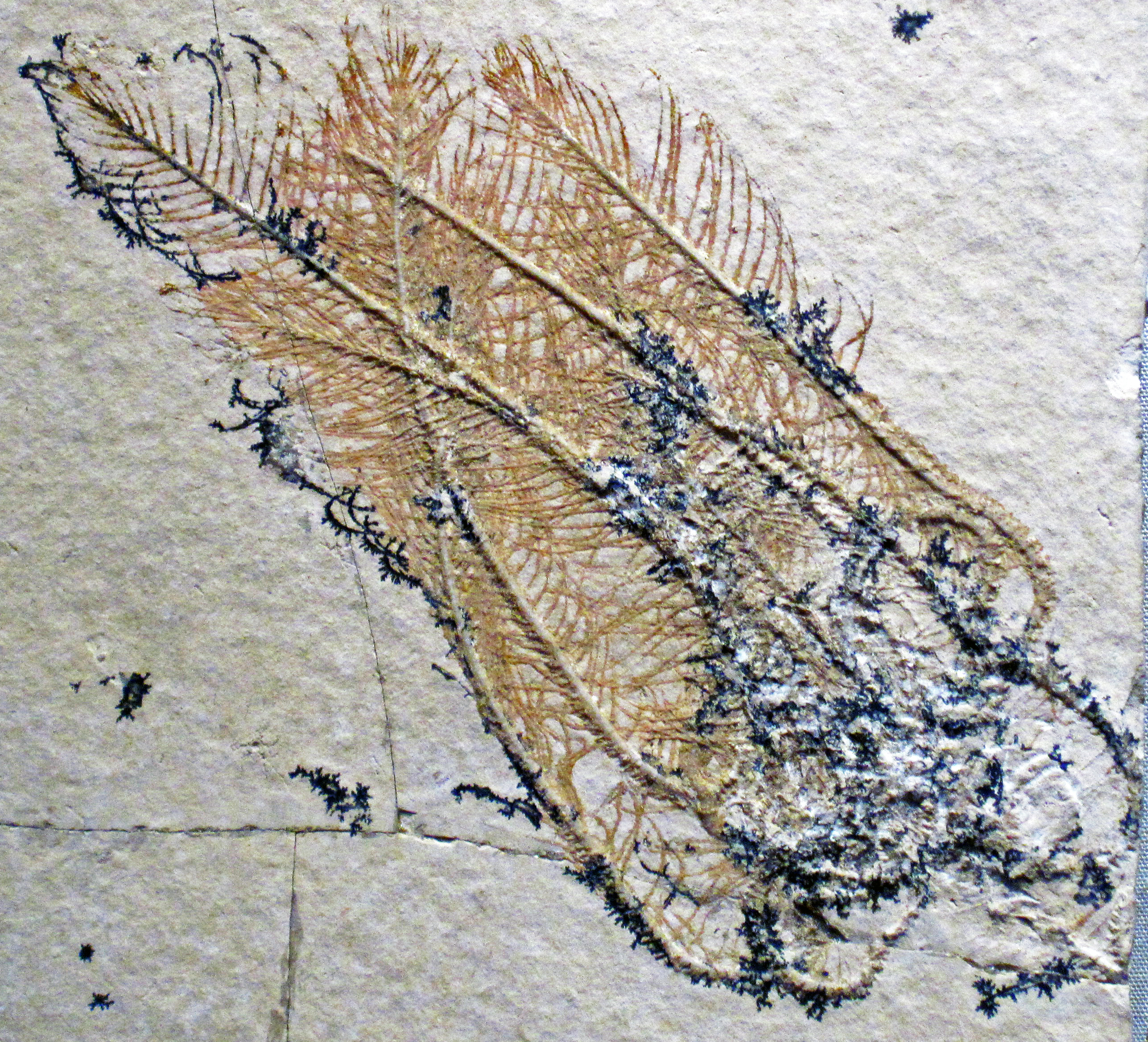
Comaturella pennata, a fossil crinoid from the Solnhofen limestone

Many comatulids live in crevices, under corals or inside sponges, the only visible part being some of the arms. Some come out at night and perch themselves on eminences to feed. Many species can locomote across the seabed, raising their body on their arms. Many can also swim with their arms but most are largely sedentary, seldom moving far from their chosen place of concealment.

== Feeding ==
Comatulids are suspension feeders. The arms are extended and held in such a position as to maximise the feeding surface with regard to the current. At each junction of the ossicles in the pinnules there are a group of three suckerless tube feet. The longest of these searches for plankton in the surrounding water. When a particle is found, it is gathered in and thrust into the ambulacral groove by all three tube feet. Here it is formed into a bolus with mucus and moved down to the mouth by the actions of the cilia, being retained in the groove by the lappets.

== Reproduction ==
Comatulids are dioecious, each individual being either male or female. The gametes are produced in specialised pinnules at the base of the arms, and fertilisation is external. The larvae are planktonic and drift with the water flow. After several larval stages they settle on the seabed and anchor themselves with a stalk. At metamorphosis, the stalk breaks and the juveniles can move around.

== Ecology ==
Comatulids consist of 80% calcium carbonate and are unappetising to most predators. A number of species of fish are known to feed on them, usually pulling off a single arm or the visceral mass, both of which can be regenerated. 47% of specimens seen by one researcher were lacking one or more arms or had regenerating limbs, so sub-lethal predation is probably low. Many other invertebrates live as commensals among the rays of crinoids and it may be these morsels that are the principal objective of most predators. The comatulid Florometra serratissima, in the north east Pacific, has been reported as being preyed on by the decorator crab Oregonia gracilis and the sunflower seastar Pycnopodia helianthoides. The loss of the arms may be due to autotomy, the shedding of an arm to save the rest of the organism. A 20 centimetres (7.9 in) arm was found to be fully regenerated in nine months in this species.

== Order Comatulida ==
The World Register of Marine Species includes the following suborders, superfamilies and families in Comatulida:

- Suborder Bourgueticrinina
  - Family Atelecrinidae
  - Family Bathycrinidae
  - Family Phrynocrinidae
  - Family Rhizocrinidae
- Suborder Oligophreata
  - Family Conometridae
- Superfamily Antedonoidea
  - Family Antedonidae
  - Family Pentametrocrinidae
  - Family Zenometridae
- Superfamily Comatuloidea
  - Family Comatulidae
- Superfamily Himerometroidea
  - Family Colobometridae
  - Family Himerometridae
  - Family Mariametridae
  - Family Zygometridae
- Superfamily Notocrinoidea
  - Family Aporometridae
  - Family Notocrinidae
- Superfamily Tropiometroidea
  - Family Asterometridae
  - Family Calometridae
  - Family Charitometridae
  - Family Maorimetridae
  - Family Ptilometridae
  - Family Thalassometridae
  - Family Tropiometridae
- Superfamily incertae sedis within Comatulida
  - Family Atopocrinidae
  - Family Bourgueticrinidae
  - Family Eudiocrinidae
  - Family Guillecrinidae
  - Family Septocrinidae
