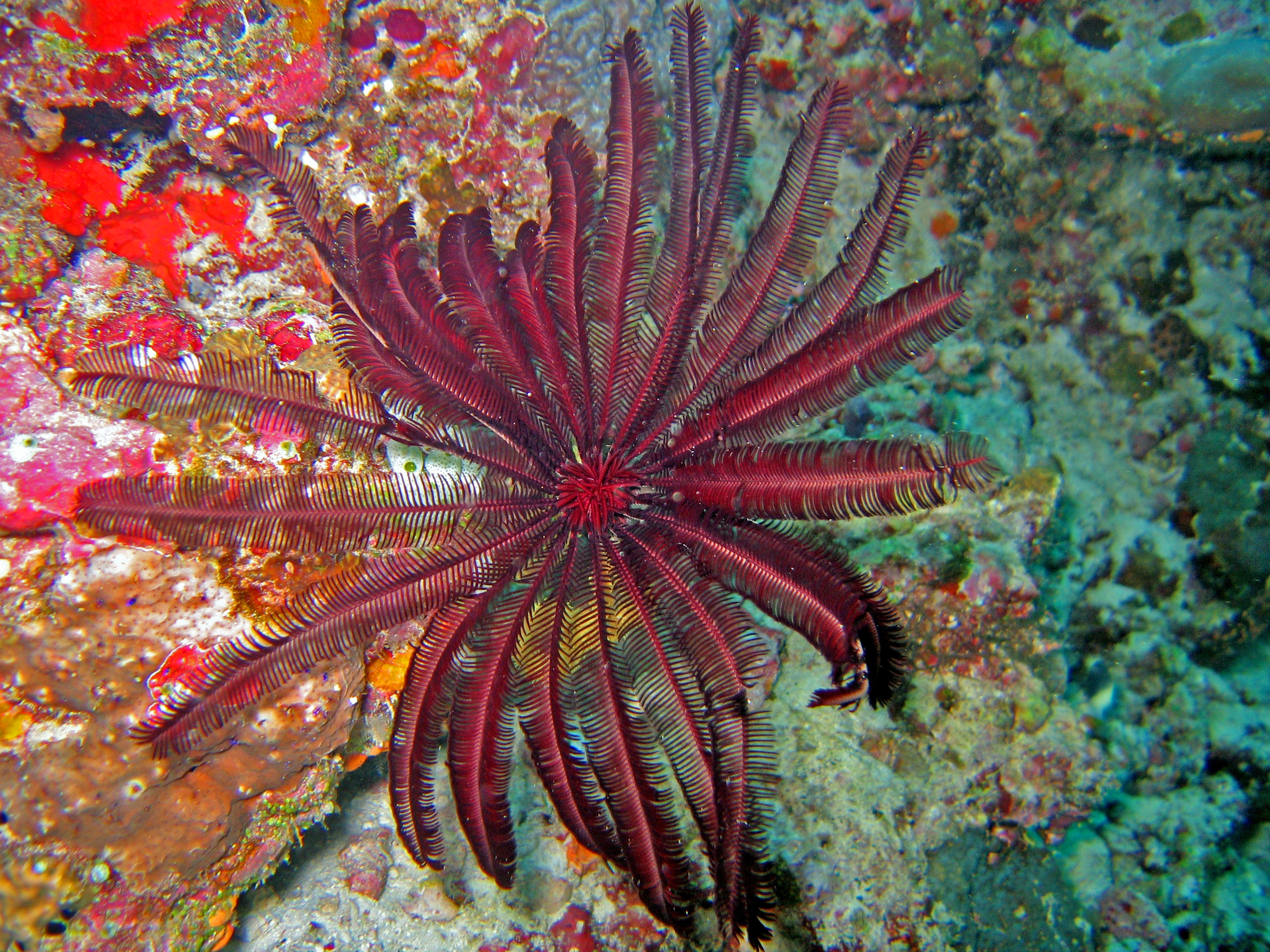
- Cenometra bella in Maldives

Scientific classification
- Kingdom: Animalia
- Phylum: Echinodermata
- Class: Crinoidea
- Order: Comatulida
- Family: Colobometridae
- Genus: Cenometra
- Species: C. bella

Binomial name
- Cenometra bella (Hartlaub, 1890)

= Cenometra bella =

Species of crinoid

Cenometra bella is a species of crinoids belonging to the genus Cenometra. They can have up to 30 arms and can be of variable colours but are often characterised by a marked contrast between the extending free-arms and the feathery pinnules (for example, dark brown and white). This species clings to its support and moves around by its feet-like cirri.

== Morphology ==
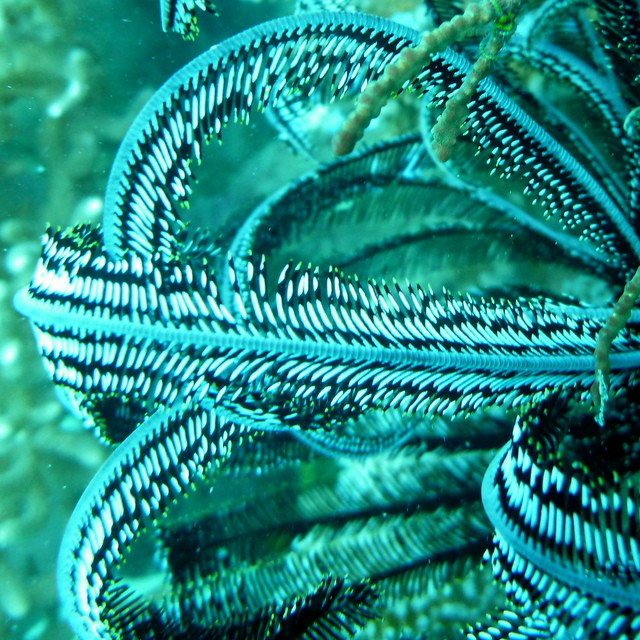
Free arms' brown spotted pinnules on a white central ridge.

Like many other crinoids, C. bella is visually comparable to both a flowering plant and a sea star. This species evolutionary morphology has remained fairly constant with minimal changes in their appearance.

These small featherstars are predominantly dark brown on their underside. The underside reveals its finger-like brachials and cirri they use to walk and anchor themselves to objects. The centrodorsal plate is the round ‘body’ that holds its brachials and arms together, and averages at 4.181mm in diameter. The mouth is located at the center of this plate. C. bella typically has five short, stiff and stout bifurcating arm bases that radiate from the centrodorsal plate of the comatulid ray, but this number can vary per individual. These arm bases branch out into two ossicles, giving them a total of ten or more free-arms. The longer non-branching portion of the arms makes up the majority of the arm length, much like many other members of the comatulida order. On average these non-branching feathery arms are 8.5 cm long for an adult C. bella. Each arm has a long white central ridge with dark brown spotted pinnules that project outwards, and slightly taper inwards at the distal end, much like that of a fern plant. Not all of their arms are regenerating, but every crinoid will have at least a few that are capable of regeneration.

Skeletally, the brachitaxes are composed of two ossicles, with ambulacral appendices. The second pinnule is massive, hard and curved. The basal segment of the proximal pinnules is curved or rounded.

== Reproduction & development ==
There are male and female sexes of C. bella. These gonochoric crinoids shed their ova or sperm from ruptured pinnules into the water. After fertilisation, their embryos grow into larvae that later sink to a substrate surface, like gorgonian coral. The growing larvae, once attached to a surface undergoes metamorphosis into a small crinoid and remains mostly sessile during growth.

== Feeding ==
The beautiful crinoid is a suspension feeder. They filter feed on marine microorganisms like algae, diatoms, and larvae. They also consume marine snow (detritus). This filtration occurs on their cirri, which is linked to the gut near the mouth and anus on the centrodorsal plate.

== Behaviour ==
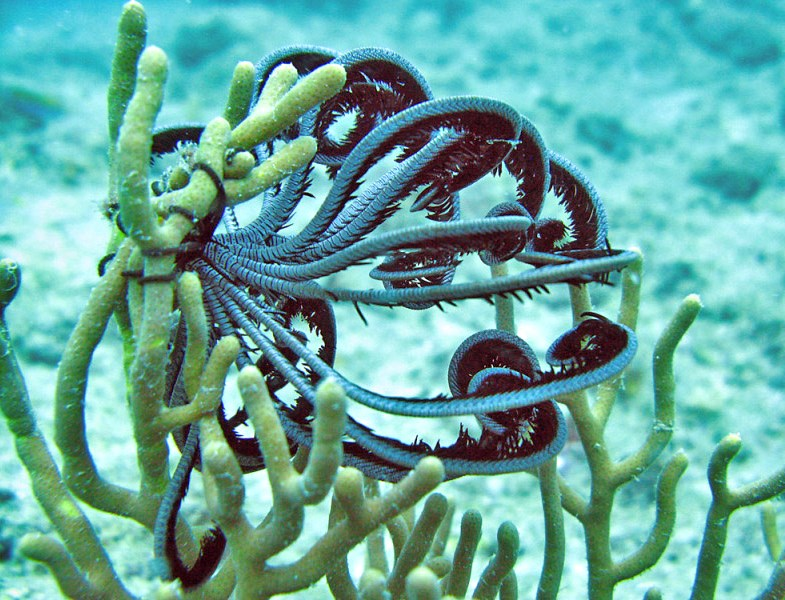
C. bella on a gorgonian coral

These featherstars are mostly sessile, anchoring themselves to hard substrate surfaces or the sea floor using their cirri ‘legs’. However, they are also free-moving creatures capable of traveling short distances to escape their predators or other threats. As nocturnal critters, they partially hide, sessile, within rocks and corals during the day with their mouths oriented upwards. Though their centrodorsal plate remains sheltered during the day as they wait till night to come out and feed, their free-arms can remain fully exposed in a circular fan-like arrangement outside of their habitat, throughout the day.

== Distribution & habitat ==
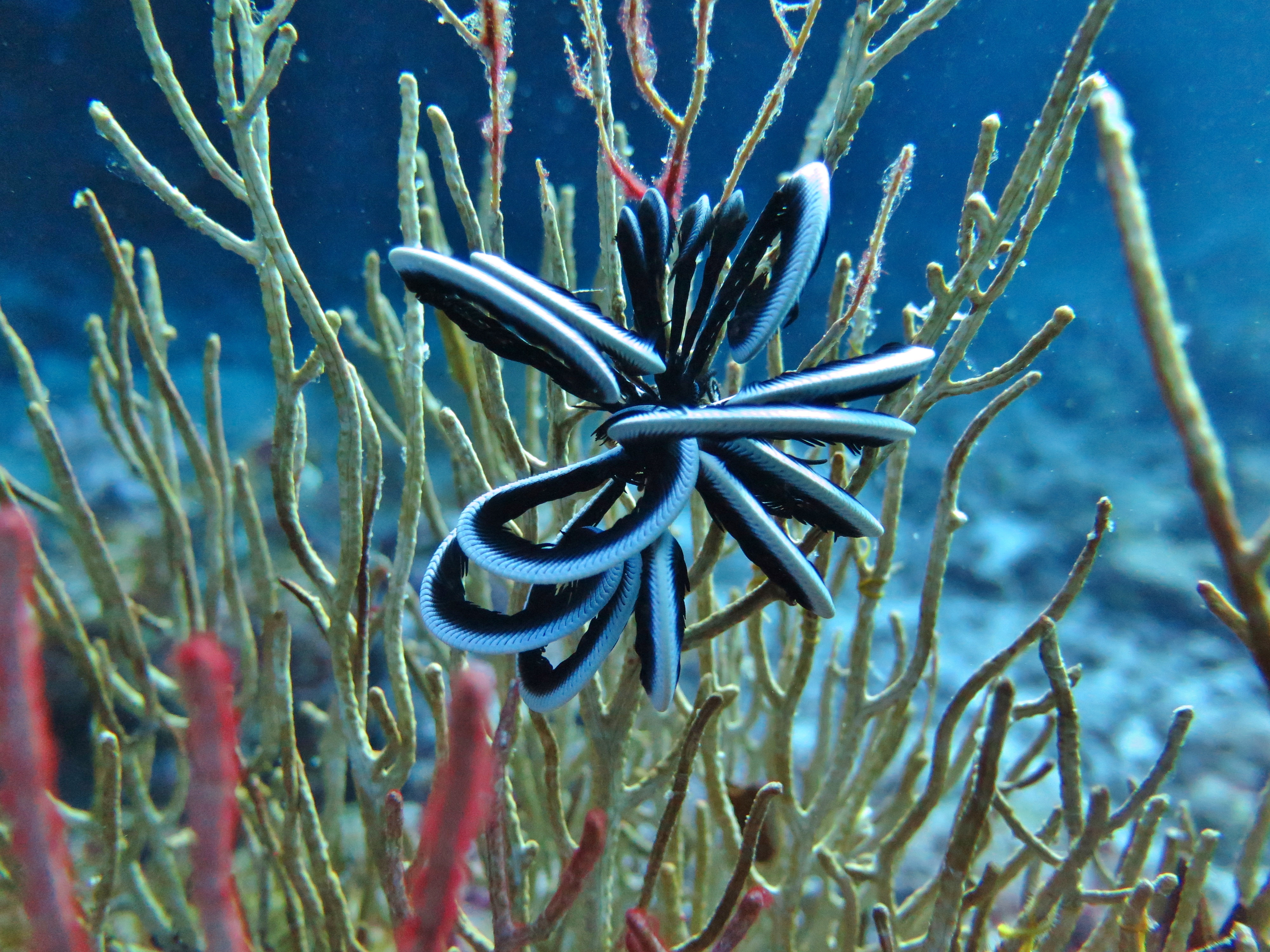

Cenometra bella typically occupies shallow tropical waters, living in open-surfaces below depths of 5 meters. They are more commonly located around large coral species in coral reefs, and sometimes found in the intertidal zone. However, in rare cases, they have been found to establish habitat in the deeper ocean (up to 55m). These featherstars are often exposed on top of a gorgonian coral, under a reef flat, or clinging to sea whips.

This shallow water species is present in the Indo-West Pacific Ocean, thriving around South and South East Asia: India, the Philippines, China, South Japan, the Maldives, South Pacific Islands. C. bella has also been found in the Great Barrier reef.

== Threat & survival adaptations ==
Being mainly sessile creatures, C. bella is highly susceptible to predators like large fish and other marine organisms. They may also lose limbs due to abiotic stressors like great salinity and temperature fluctuations. On average, the feather-star is reported to lose an arm every 8 to12 days. As a survival mechanism, this crinoid has evolved to be able to lose and regenerate lost limbs, much like a sea-star. Their pinules are also spiked to protect them from predators. In addition, C. bella are able to produce aversive tasting and toxic chemicals to deter predators from consuming their arms that remain exposed out of their habitat throughout the day. The deterrent taste not only provides immediate protection from their predators but also forms long-term negative conditioning to prevent large fish from attacking again. These antifeedant chemicals also provide the beautiful crinoid's colour.
