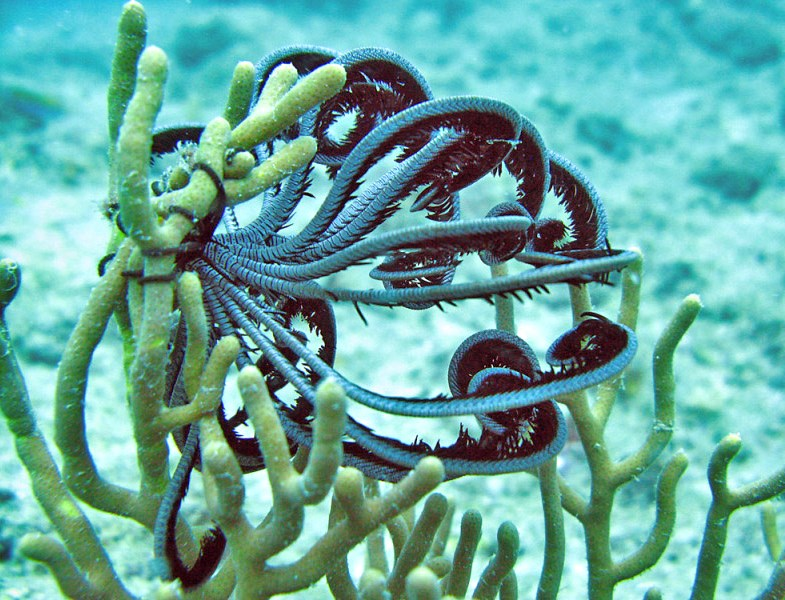
- Cenometra bella

Scientific classification
- Kingdom: Animalia
- Phylum: Echinodermata
- Class: Crinoidea
- Superorder: Articulata
- Order: Comatulida
- Family: Colobometridae
- Genus: Cenometra; A.H. Clark, 1911

= Cenometra =

Genus of crinoids

Cenometra is a genus of crinoids belonging to the family Colobometridae.

== Species ==
Species within this genus include:

- Cenometra bella (Hartlaub, 1890)
- Cenometra emendatrix (Bell, 1892)
