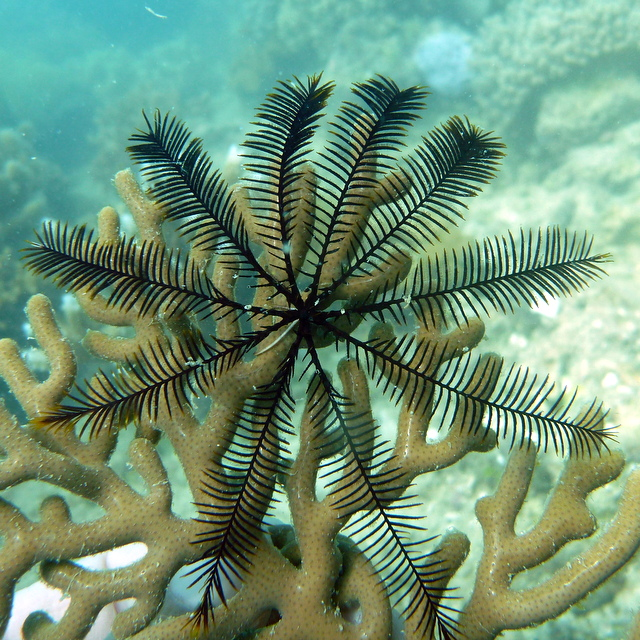

Scientific classification
- Kingdom: Animalia
- Phylum: Echinodermata
- Class: Crinoidea
- Order: Comatulida
- Family: Colobometridae
- Genus: Colobometra
- Species: C. perspinosa

Binomial name
- Colobometra perspinosa (Carpenter, 1881)

= Colobometra perspinosa =

Species of crinoid

Colobometra perspinosa is a species of echinoderm known by the common name black feather star.

The black feather star is widespread throughout the tropical waters of the central Indo-Pacific region. This feather star is often clung to gorgonians, exposed their open arms to the marine flow to optimise the nutriment capture.

Its maximal diameter is 30 cm (12 in) for ten arms maximum. Its coloration is usually black but it can also be black and white, and even brown-gold for rare specimen.
