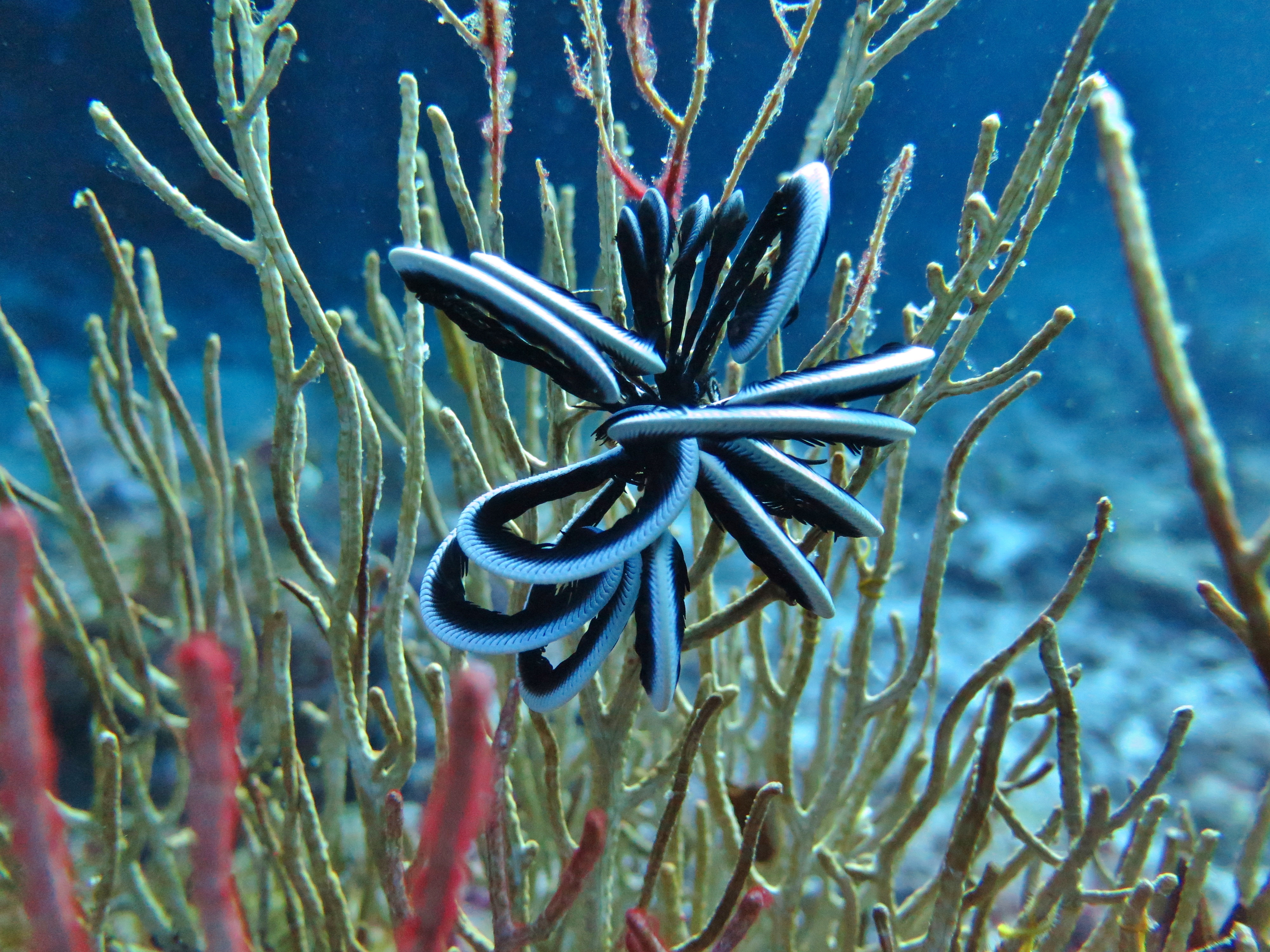
- Cenometra bella in Maldives.

Scientific classification
- Kingdom: Animalia
- Phylum: Echinodermata
- Class: Crinoidea
- Superorder: Articulata
- Order: Comatulida
- Superfamily: Himerometroidea
- Family: Colobometridae; A.H. Clark, 1909

= Colobometridae =

Family of crinoids

Colobometridae is a family of crinoids belonging to the order Comatulida. Members of this order are known as feather stars.

== Genera ==
Genera within this family include:

- Alisometra A.H. Clark, 1947
- Analcidometra A.H. Clark, 1918
- Austrometra A.H. Clark, 1916
- Basilometra A.H. Clark, 1936
- Cenometra A.H. Clark, 1911
- Clarkometra Gislén, 1922
- Colobometra A.H. Clark, 1909
- Cotylometra A.H. Clark, 1916
- Cyllometra A.H. Clark, 1907
- Decametra A.H. Clark, 1911
- Embryometra Gislén, 1938
- Epimetra A.H. Clark, 1911
- Gislenometra A.H. Clark, 1947
- Iconometra A.H. Clark, 1929
- Oligometra A.H. Clark, 1908
- Oligometrides A.H. Clark, 1918
- Petasometra A.H. Clark, 1912
- Pontiometra A.H. Clark, 1907

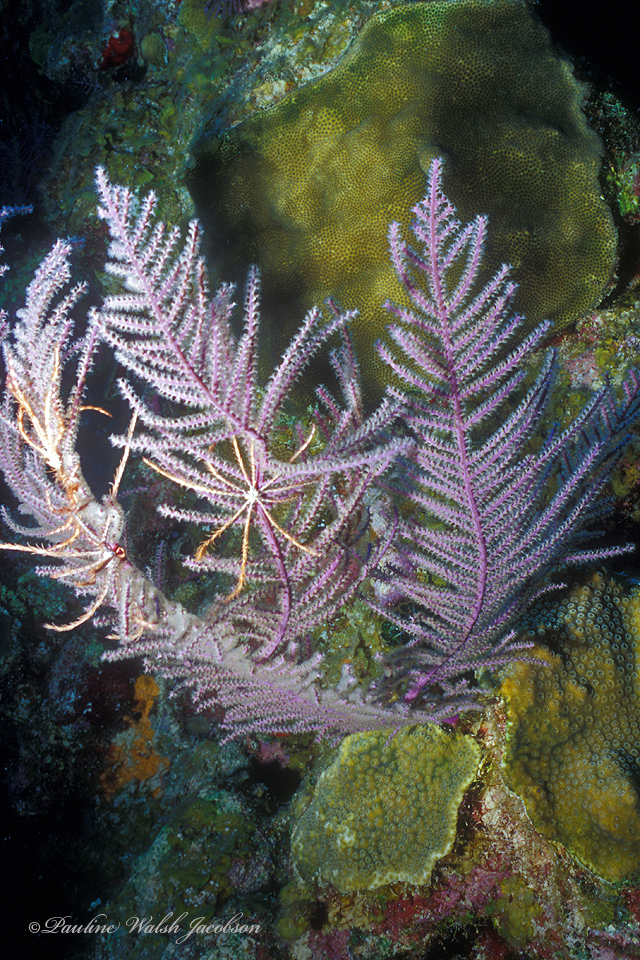
Analcidometra armata

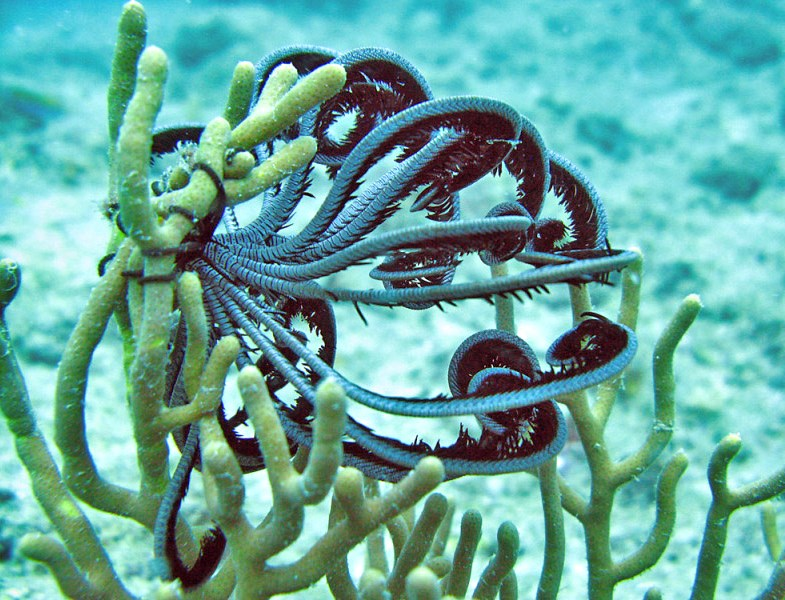
Cenometra bella

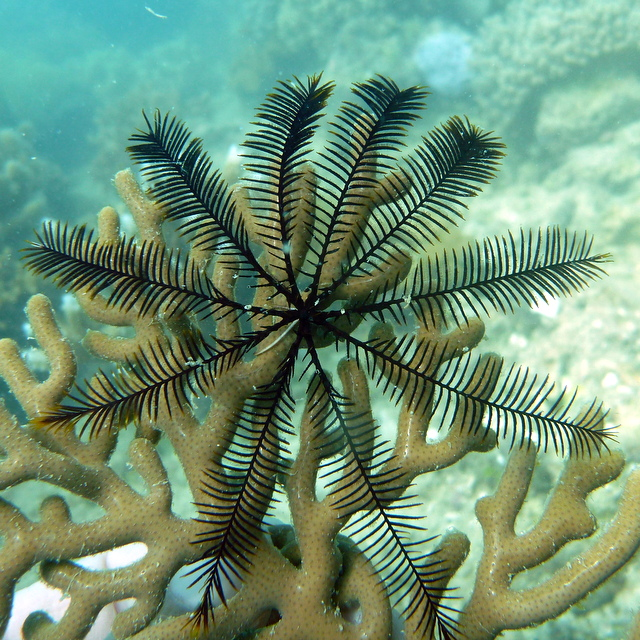
Colobometra perspinosa

Decametra tigrina

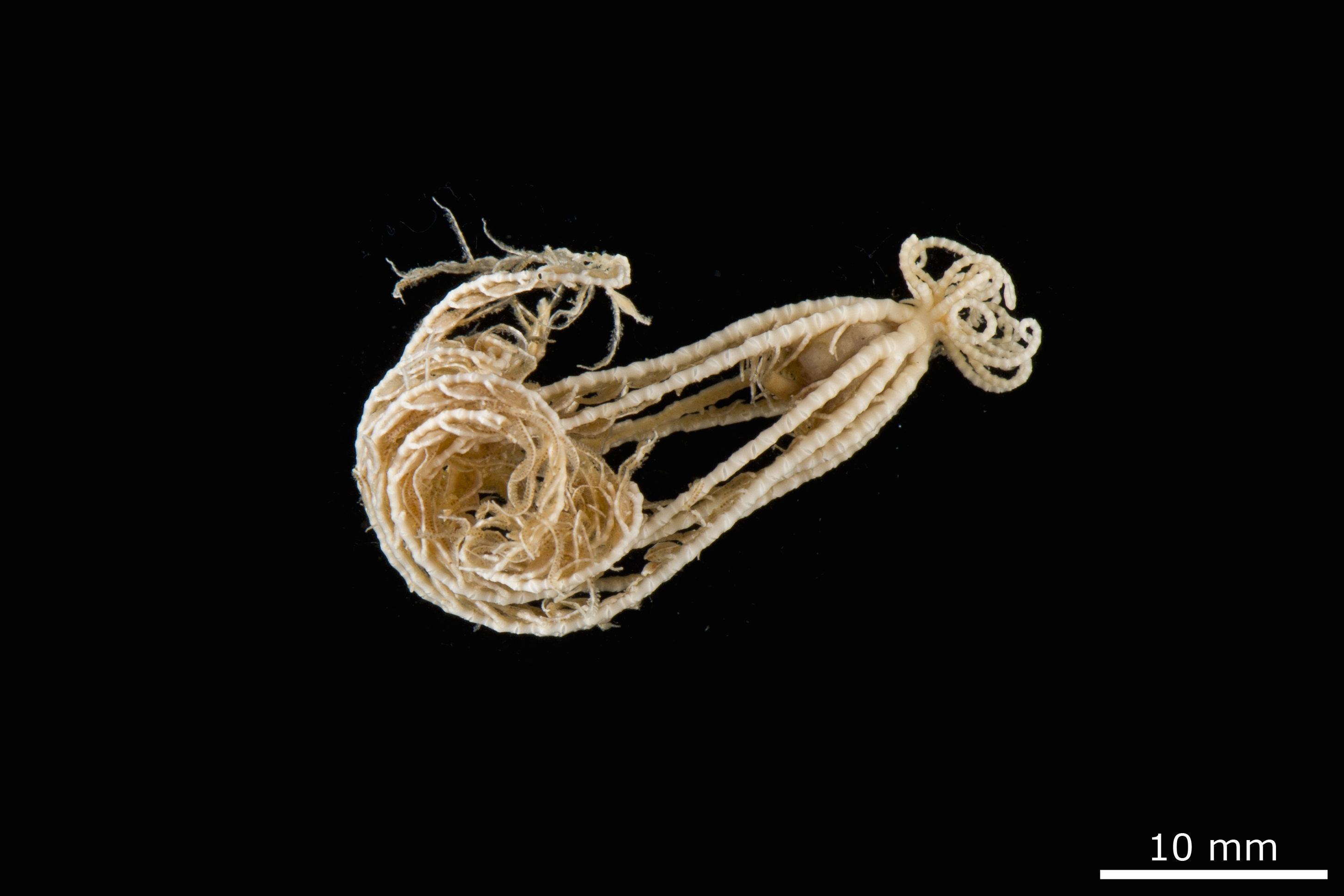
Embryometra mortenseni

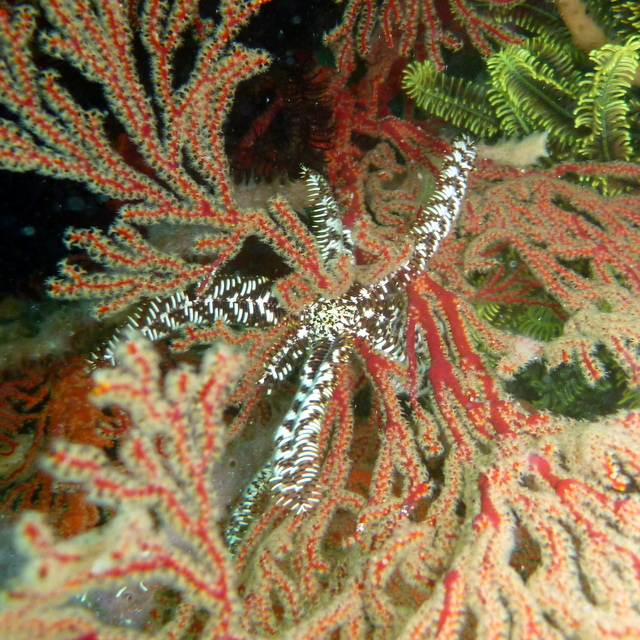
Oligometra serripinna

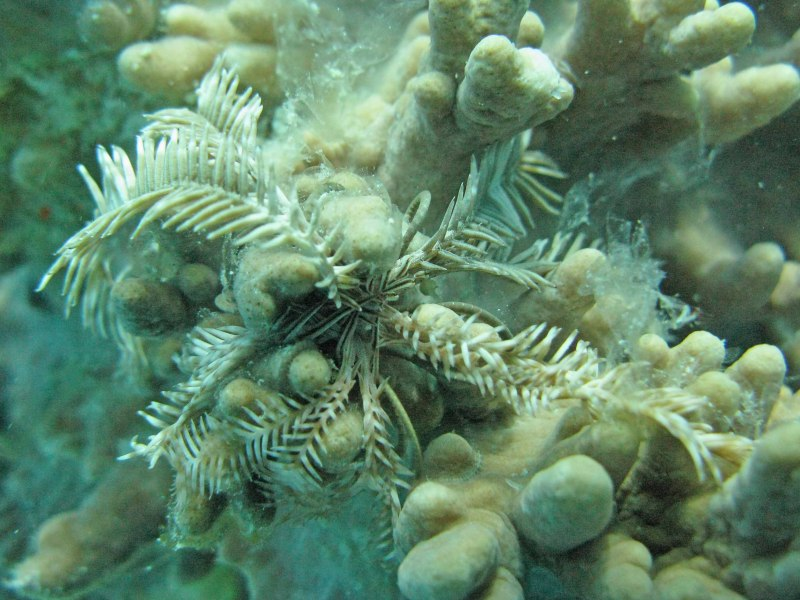
Petasometra clarae

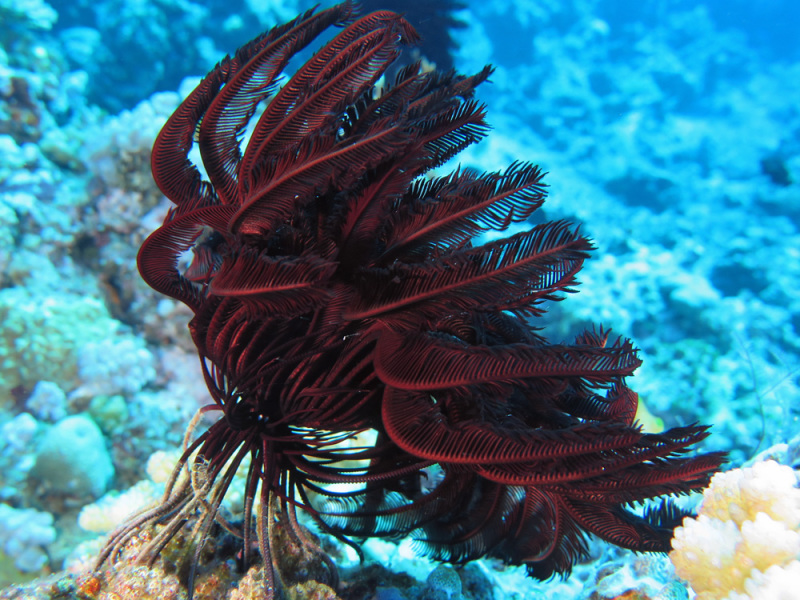
Pontiometra andersoni
