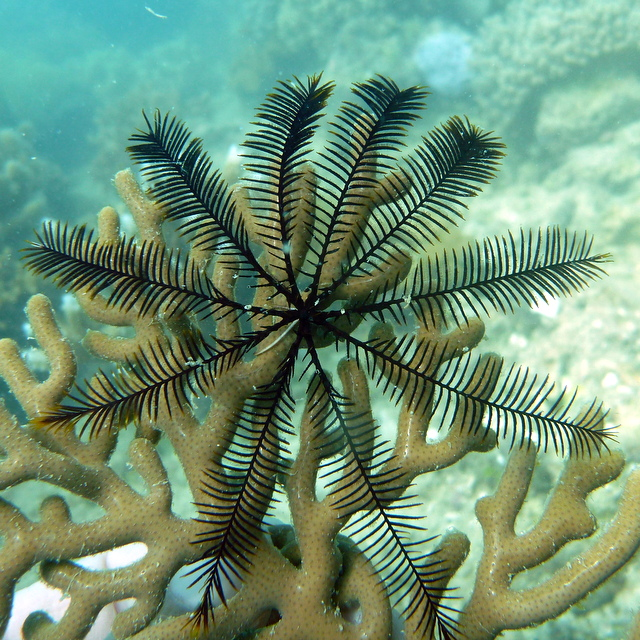
- Colobometra perspinosa

Scientific classification
- Kingdom: Animalia
- Phylum: Echinodermata
- Class: Crinoidea
- Superorder: Articulata
- Order: Comatulida
- Family: Colobometridae
- Genus: Colobometra; A.H. Clark, 1909

Species
- Colobometra arabica AH Clark, 1937; Colobometra discolor AH Clark, 1909; Colobometra perspinosa (Carpenter, 1881); Colobometra suavis (AH Clark, 1908)

= Colobometra =

Genus of crinoids

Colobometra is a genus of echinoderms.
