= Clarkometra =

Scientific classification
- Kingdom: Animalia
- Phylum: Echinodermata
- Class: Crinoidea
- Superorder: Articulata
- Order: Comatulida
- Family: Colobometridae
- Genus: Clarkometra; Gislén, 1922
- Species: C. elegans

Binomial name
- Clarkometra elegans Gislén, 1922

Genus of crinoids

Clarkometra elegans is a species of feather star, a type of crinoid, in the family Colobometridae, and the only species in the genus Clarkometra. It is found from South West Mindanao in the Philippines to the Bonin Islands, Japan. It occurs at a depth ranging from 72 to 80 m.
