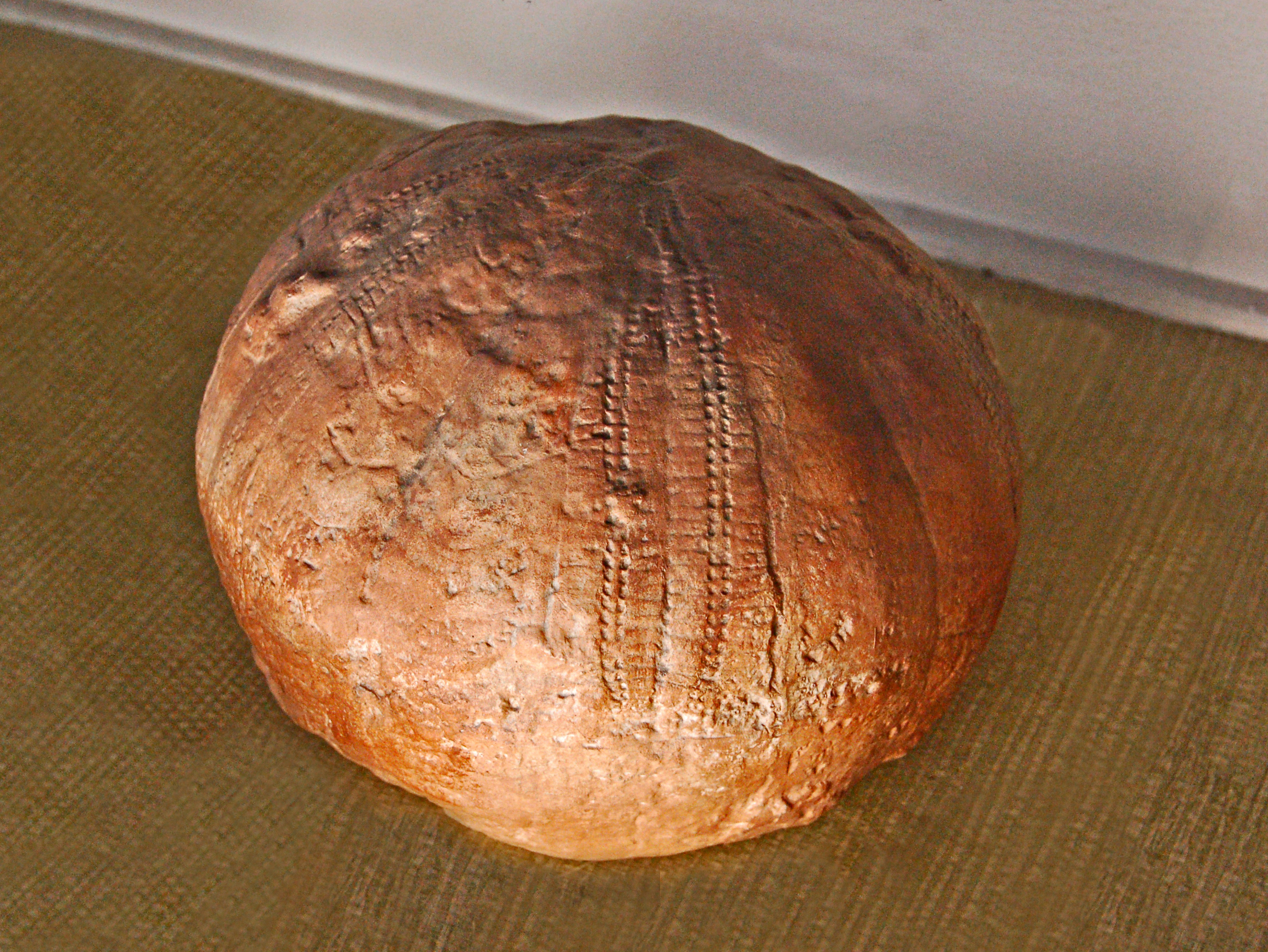
- Fossil of Prosostoma jimenoi from Cuba, on display at Galerie de paléontologie et d'anatomie comparée in Paris

Scientific classification
- Kingdom: Animalia
- Phylum: Echinodermata
- Class: Echinoidea
- Order: Spatangoida
- Suborder: Brissidina
- Family: †Asterostomatidae; Pictet, 1857

= Asterostomatidae =

Asterostomatidae Temporal range: From Eocene to Miocene 55.8–5.332 Ma

Extinct family of sea urchins

Asterostomatidae is an extinct family of sea urchins belonging to the order Spatangoida.

They are slow-moving, shallow infaunal, or sediment-dwelling organisms, and are deposit feeders or detritivores. They lived during the Eocene and Miocene in what is now of Cuba, Cyprus and United States, from 55.8 to 5.332 Ma

== Genera ==
- Antillaster
- Asterostoma
- Brissolampas
- Brissomorpha
- Cleistechinus
- Heterobrissus
- Megapetalus
- Moronaster
- Platybrissus
- Prosostoma
- Pygospatangus
