= Argopatagus vitreus =

Scientific classification
- Kingdom: Animalia
- Phylum: Echinodermata
- Class: Echinoidea
- Order: Spatangoida
- Family: Macropneustidae
- Genus: Argopatagus
- Species: A. vitreus

Binomial name
- Argopatagus vitreus (A. Agassiz, 1879)

Species of sea urchin

Argopatagus vitreus is a species of sea urchin of the family Macropneustidae. Their armour is covered with spines. It is placed in the genus Argopatagus and lives in the sea. Argopatagus vitreus was first scientifically described in 1879 by Alexander Emanuel Agassiz, an American scientist.
