= Argopatagus planus =

Scientific classification
- Kingdom: Animalia
- Phylum: Echinodermata
- Class: Echinoidea
- Order: Spatangoida
- Family: Macropneustidae
- Genus: Argopatagus
- Species: A. planus

Binomial name
- Argopatagus planus (A. Agassiz & Hubert Lyman Clark, 1907)

Species of sea urchin

Argopatagus planus is a species of sea urchin of the family Macropneustidae. Their armour is covered with spines. It is placed in the genus Argopatagus and lives in the sea. Argopatagus planus was first scientifically described in 1907 by Alexander Emanuel Agassiz and Hubert Lyman Clark, American scientists.
