= Aeropsis fulva =

Scientific classification
- Kingdom: Animalia
- Phylum: Echinodermata
- Class: Echinoidea
- Order: Spatangoida
- Family: Aeropsidae
- Genus: Aeropsis
- Species: A. fulva

Binomial name
- Aeropsis fulva (Agassiz, 1898)

Species of sea urchin

Aeropsis fulva is a species of sea urchin of the family Aeropsidae. Their armour is covered with spines. It is placed in the genus Aeropsis and lives in the sea. Aeropsis fulva was first scientifically described in 1898 by Alexander Emanuel Agassiz.
