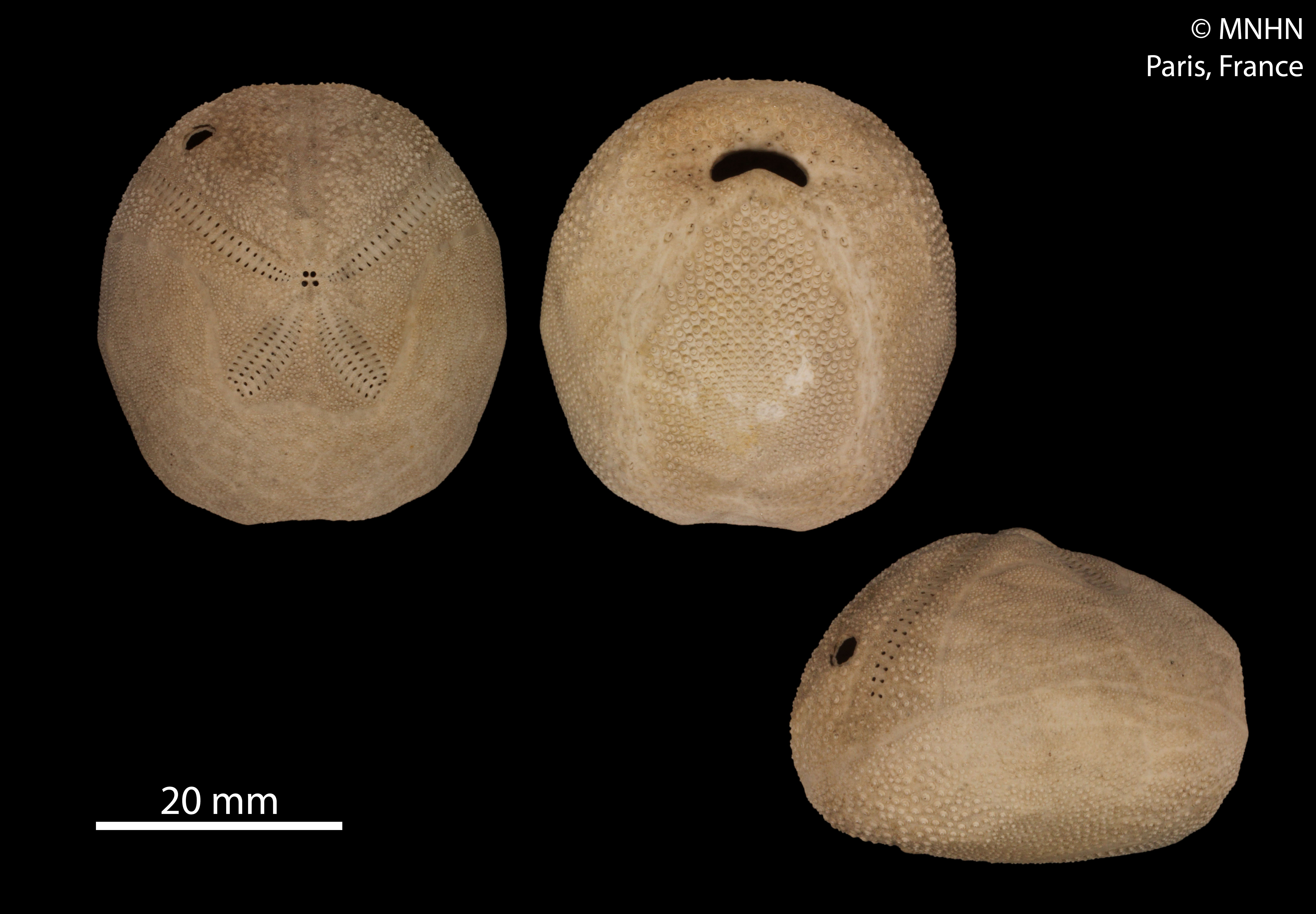

Scientific classification
- Domain: Eukaryota
- Kingdom: Animalia
- Phylum: Echinodermata
- Class: Echinoidea
- Order: Spatangoida
- Family: Prenasteridae
- Genus: Agassizia
- Species: A. scrobiculata

Binomial name
- Agassizia scrobiculata (Valenciennes, 1846)

= Agassizia scrobiculata =

Species of sea urchin

Agassizia scrobiculata is a species of sea urchin of the family Prenasteridae.
