= Agassizia excentrica =

Scientific classification
- Domain: Eukaryota
- Kingdom: Animalia
- Phylum: Echinodermata
- Class: Echinoidea
- Order: Spatangoida
- Family: Prenasteridae
- Genus: Agassizia
- Species: A. excentrica

Binomial name
- Agassizia excentrica (Agassiz, 1869)

Species of sea urchin

Agassizia excentrica is a species of sea urchin of the family Prenasteridae. The species was first scientifically described in 1869 by Alexander Agassiz.
