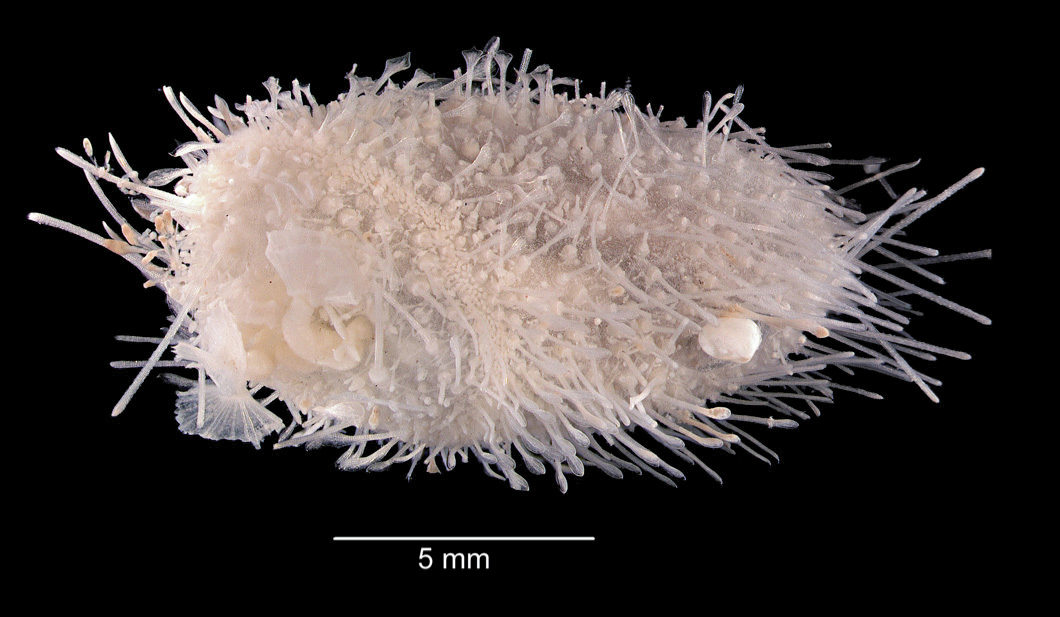
- Aeropsis rostrata

Scientific classification
- Kingdom: Animalia
- Phylum: Echinodermata
- Class: Echinoidea
- Order: Spatangoida
- Family: Aeropsidae
- Genus: Aeropsis; Mortensen, 1907

= Aeropsis =

Genus of sea urchins

Aeropsis is a genus of sea urchins in the family Aeropsidae.

Two species are recognized:

- Aeropsis fulva (A. Agassiz, 1898)
- Aeropsis rostrata (Norman, 1876)
