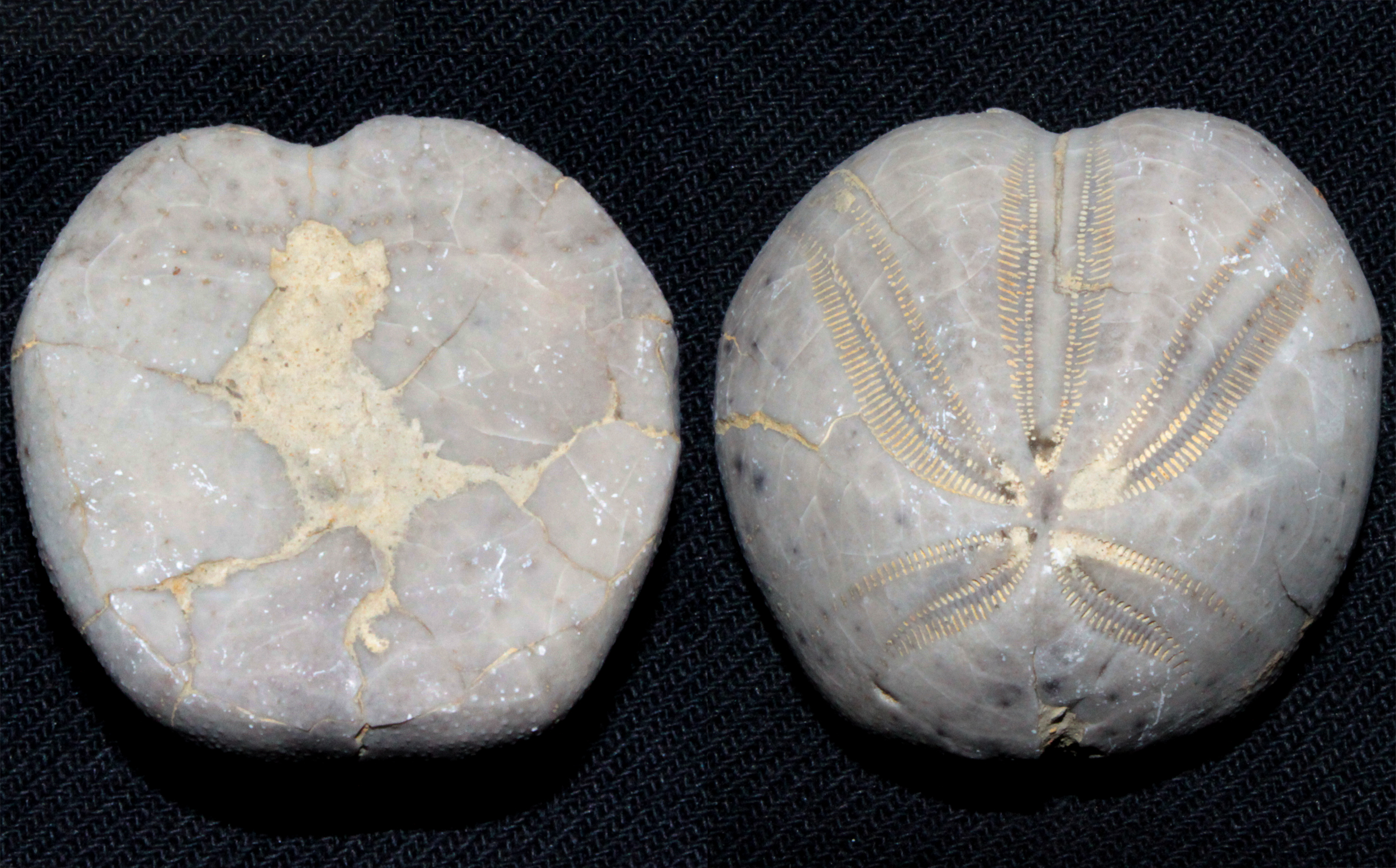
- Fossil of Heteraster oblongus from Spain

Scientific classification
- Domain: Eukaryota
- Kingdom: Animalia
- Phylum: Echinodermata
- Class: Echinoidea
- Order: Spatangoida
- Family: †Toxasteridae
- Genus: †Heteraster; Orbigny, 1855

= Heteraster =

Heteraster Temporal range: Cretaceous

Extinct genus of sea urchins

Heteraster is an extinct genus of sea urchins belonging to the family Toxasteridae.

These slow-moving shallow infaunal deposit feeder-detritivores lived during the Cretaceous period. Fossils of this family have been found in the sediments of Algeria, Egypt, France, Hungary, Mexico, Peru, Portugal, Serbia and Montenegro, Spain, Switzerland and Yemen.

== Species ==
- Heteraster oblongus Brongniart, 1821
- Heteraster delgadoi (Loriol, 1888)
- Heteraster renevieri (Desor, 1858).
- Heteraster transiens Devries (1956)
- Heteraster tissoti Coquand
- Heteraster peroni Ficheur
- Heteraster castellon
