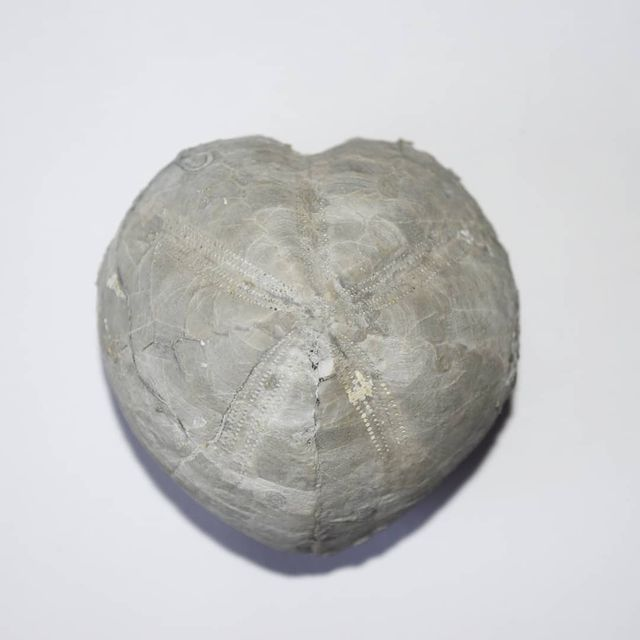
- Micraster antious Cretaceous (Opakua)

Scientific classification
- Kingdom: Animalia
- Phylum: Echinodermata
- Class: Echinoidea
- Order: Spatangoida
- Family: Micrasteridae
- Genus: †Micraster; Agassiz, 1836

= Micraster =

Micraster Temporal range: Late Cretaceous-Paleogene 94.3–55.8 Ma

Extinct genus of sea urchins

Micraster is an extinct genus of echinoids from the Late Cretaceous to the early Eocene. Its remains have been found in Africa, Antarctica, Europe, and North America. Micraster was an infaunal echinoid living in a burrow below the sediment surface. The test is clearly bilateral and there is a deep anterior groove to take in water containing organic particles to the mouth. The tube feet keep a supply of nutrient-laden water moving into the burrow. The anus has a waste tube behind it.

== Continuous evolution ==
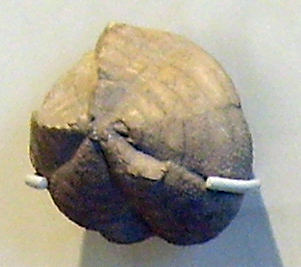
Micraster sp. fossil at the Geological Museum, Copenhagen

In the classic text The Science of Life (1931), H. G. Wells, Julian Huxley and G. P. Wells use Micraster as an example of a fossil whose continuous evolution can be traced over some 10 million years through 450–500 feet of chalk beds of the Late Cretaceous. They point out:

"During this long period the fossil Micrasters are so abundant that hundreds of thousands can be collected and a gradual evolution can be traced as we pass upward. The changes are apparently trivial. There is a slow alteration of shape from rather flattened to rather arched, and from rather elongated to about as broads as long. The mouth creeps steadily forward, its distance from the front border of the lower surface decreasing from about a third of the body-length in the early types to a sixth in the latest, on a total length of fifty to sixty millimetres ... though the changes involved are small, they are absolutely continuous, the urchins found at one level grading quite imperceptibly into those of the rest; a single specimen, indeed, may show characters of one "species" in some of its tube-feet, characters of another in the rest."

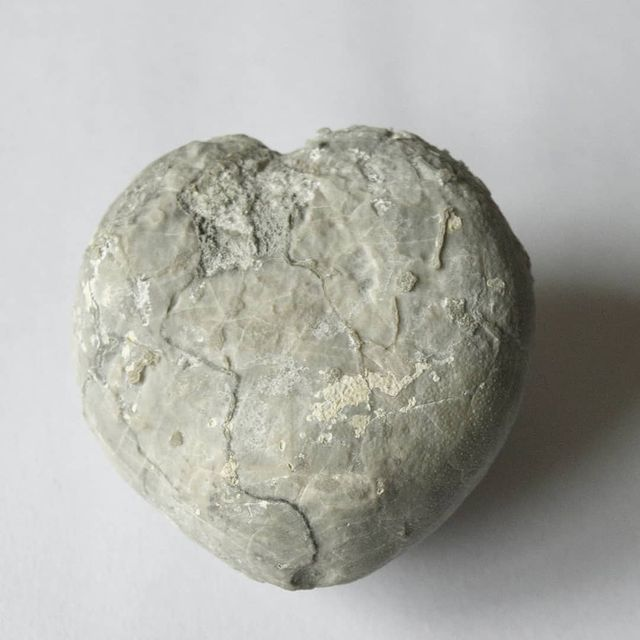
Ventral view of Micraster sp

== Species ==
- Micraster burgiensis Lambert, 1935 †
- Micraster coravium Moskvin & Poslavskaya, 1959 †
- Micraster corangium Leske, 1778 †
- Micraster decipiens Bayle 1878 †
- Micraster depressus Kongiel, 1937 †
- Micraster desori Odum, 1926 †
- Micraster elevatus Sánchez Roig, 1949 †
- Micraster ernsti Schlüter, 2024 †
- Micraster leskei d'Orbigny, 1855 †
- Micraster norfolkensis Smith & Wright, 2012 †
- Micraster piriformis Böhm, 1927 †
- Micraster quebrada Schlüter et al., 2023 †
- Micraster subglobosus Moskvin & Poslavskaya, 1959 †
- Micraster trangahyensis Lambert, 1936 †
- Micraster turonensis Bayle 1878 †
- Micraster uddeni Cooke, 1953 †
- Micraster vistulensis Kongiel, 1950 †

== Sources ==
- Fossils (Smithsonian Handbooks) by David Ward (Page 185)
