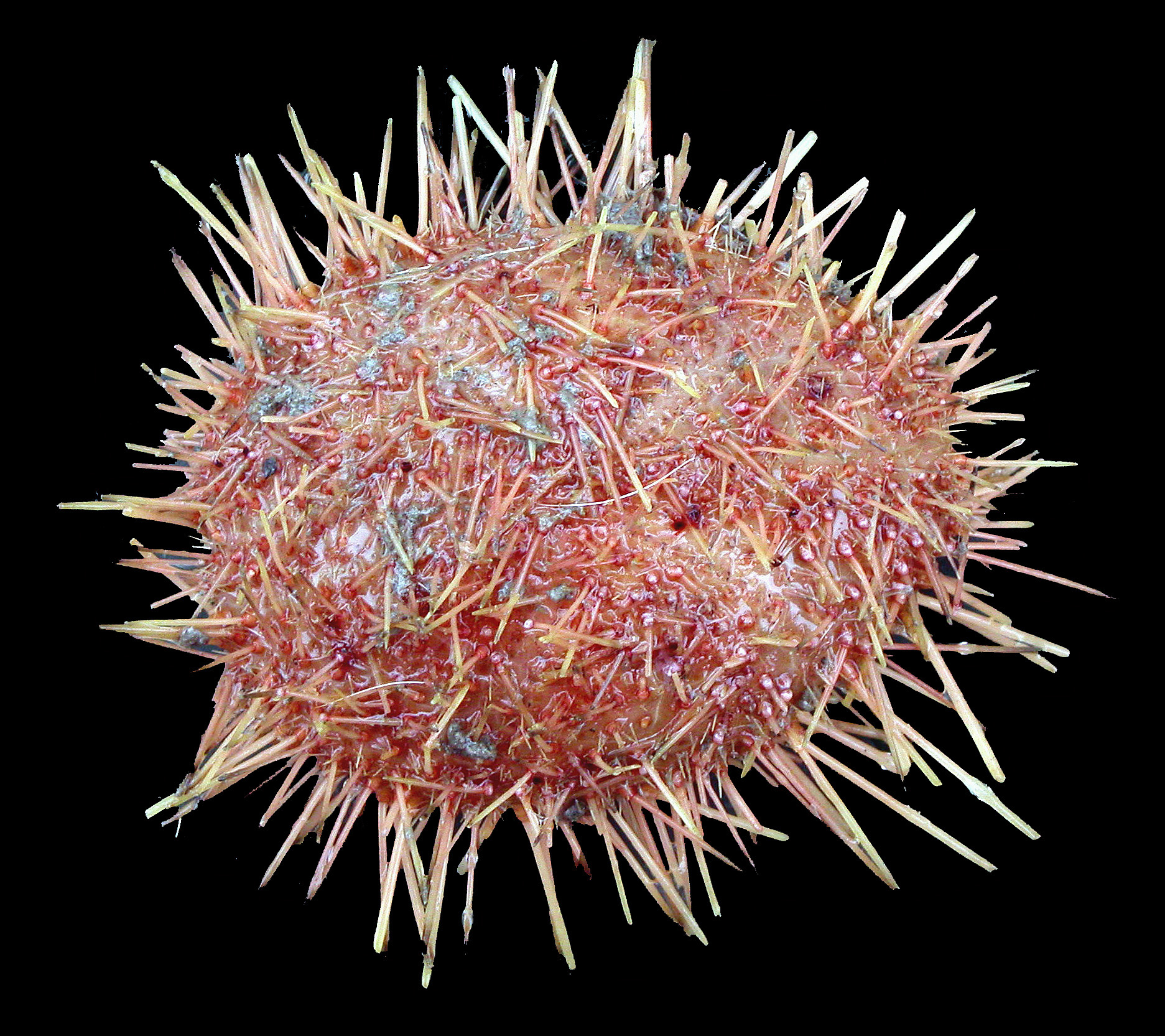
- Brachysternaster chesheri

Scientific classification
- Domain: Eukaryota
- Kingdom: Animalia
- Phylum: Echinodermata
- Class: Echinoidea
- Order: Spatangoida
- Suborder: Paleopneustina
- Family: Paleopneustina incertae sedis B
- Genus: Brachysternaster; Larrain, 1985
- Species: B. chesheri

Binomial name
- Brachysternaster chesheri Larrain, 1985

= Brachysternaster =

Monotypic genus of sea urchin

Brachysternaster is a monotypic genus of sea urchins of the suborder Paleopneustina. Its sole accepted species is Brachysternaster chesheri, first scientifically described in 1985 by Larrain.
