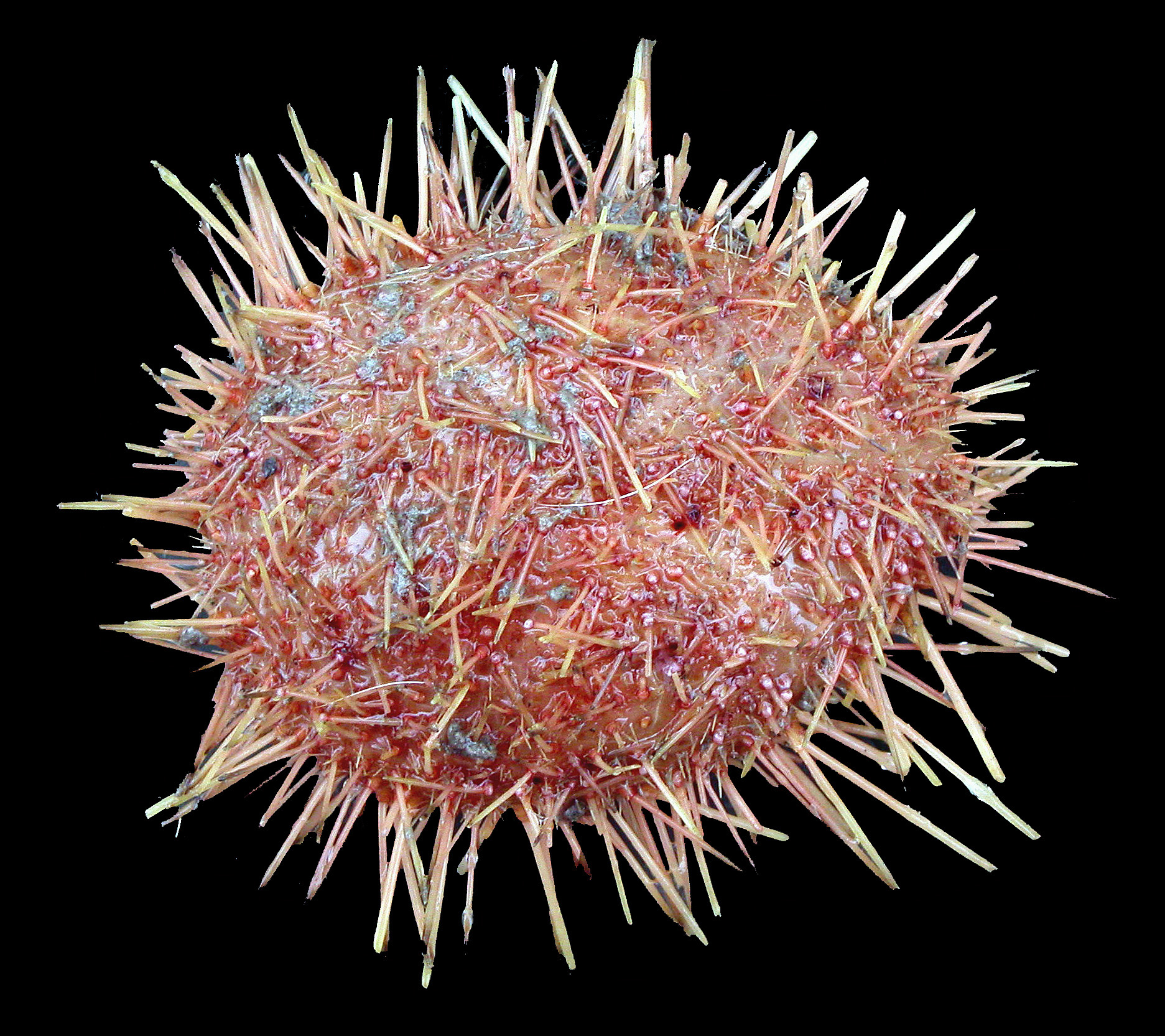
- Brachysternaster chesheri

Scientific classification
- Domain: Eukaryota
- Kingdom: Animalia
- Phylum: Echinodermata
- Class: Echinoidea
- Order: Spatangoida
- Suborder: Paleopneustina; Markov & Solovjev, 2001

= Paleopneustina =

Suborder of sea urchin

Paleopneustina is a suborder of sea urchins of the order Spatangoida. Its taxonomy is still under investigation.

The following subdivisions are accepted within Paleopneustina:

- Superfamily Paleopneustoidea A. Agassiz, 1904
  - Family Paleopneustidae A. Agassiz, 1904
  - Family Pericosmidae Lambert, 1905
- Family †Periasteridae Lambert, 1920
- Family Prenasteridae Lambert, 1905
- Family Schizasteridae Lambert, 1905

Several other genera have been placed in temporary unnamed families:

- Family †Paleopneustina incertae sedis [fossil]
  - †Kertaster Bajarunas in Zittel, 1934
- Family Paleopneustina incertae sedis A
  - †Eopericosmus Markov & Solovjev, 2001
  - †Hemigymnia Arnaud, 1898
  - Schizocosmus Markov, 1990
- Family Paleopneustina incertae sedis B (temporary name)
  - Amphipneustes Koehler, 1900
  - Brachysternaster Larrain, 1985
  - †Brissolampas Pomel, 1883
  - Genicopatagus A. Agassiz, 1879
  - Heterobrissus Manzoni & Mazzetti, 1878
  - †Megapetalus H.L. Clark, 1929
  - Parapneustes Koehler, 1912
  - †Pygospatangus Cotteau, 1888
