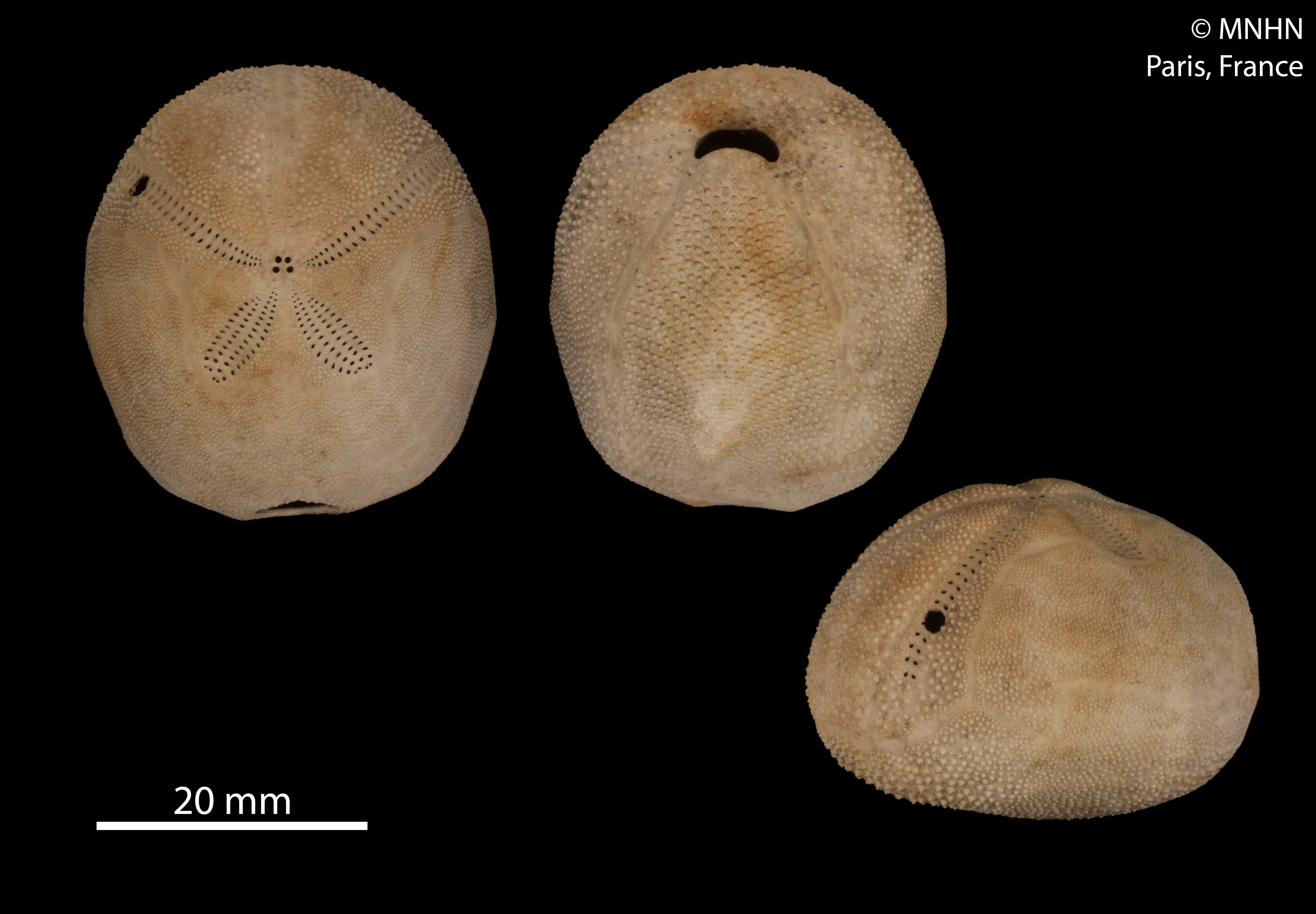
- Agassizia scrobiculata

Scientific classification
- Kingdom: Animalia
- Phylum: Echinodermata
- Class: Echinoidea
- Order: Spatangoida
- Family: Prenasteridae
- Genus: Agassizia; Valenciennes, 1846

= Agassizia =

Extinct genus of sea urchins

Agassizia is a genus of sea urchin of the family Prenasteridae. The species was first scientifically described in 1869 by Achille Valenciennes.

== Species ==
- Agassizia aequipetala Gregory 1892
- Agassizia algarbiensis Da Veiga Ferreira 1962
- Agassizia alveari Sánchez Roig 1949
- Agassizia avilensis Sánchez Roig 1949
- Agassizia camagueyana Weisbord 1934
- Agassizia caobaensis Sánchez Roig 1953
- Agassizia caribbeana Weisbord 1934
- Agassizia cyrenaica Desio 1929
- Agassizia eugeniae Brito & Ramires 1974
- Agassizia excentrica A. Agassiz 1869
- Agassizia flexuosa Sánchez Roig 1949
- Agassizia guanensis Sánchez Roig 1951
- Agassizia lamberti Palmer ex Sánchez Roig 1949
- Agassizia pinarensis Sánchez Roig 1952
- Agassizia regia Israelsky 1924
- Agassizia scrobiculata Valenciennes 1846
