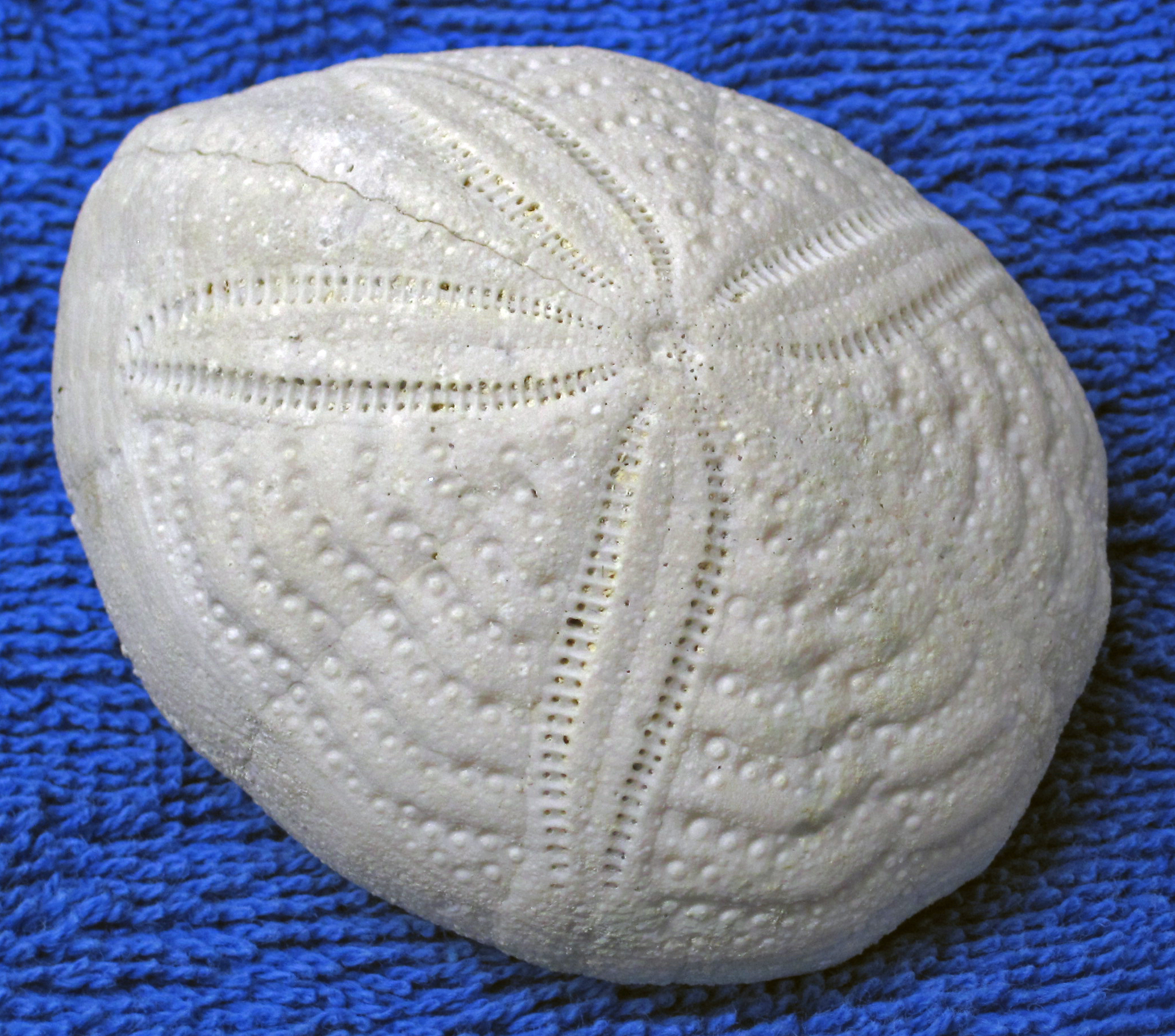
- Eupatagus mooreanus

Scientific classification
- Kingdom: Animalia
- Phylum: Echinodermata
- Class: Echinoidea
- Order: Spatangoida
- Family: Eupatagidae
- Genus: Eupatagus; L. Agassiz in Agassiz & Desor, 1847

= Eupatagus =

Eupatagus Temporal range: Miocene–present

Genus of sea urchins

Euptagus is a genus of sea urchins. It is in the family Eupatagidae.
