= Proraster =

Scientific classification
- Kingdom: Animalia
- Phylum: Echinodermata
- Class: Echinoidea
- Order: Spatangoida
- Family: Hemiasteridae
- Genus: Proraster; Lambert, 1895

Genus of sea urchins

Proraster is a genus of echinoderms belonging to the family Hemiasteridae.

The species of this genus are found in Europe, Northern America and Australia.

Species:

- Proraster atavus (Arnaud, 1883)
- Proraster geayi Cottreau, 1908
- Proraster granti Kier, 1972a
- Proraster jukesii (Gray, 1851)
- Proraster magnus Markov, 1994
- Proraster oedumi Stokes, 1975
