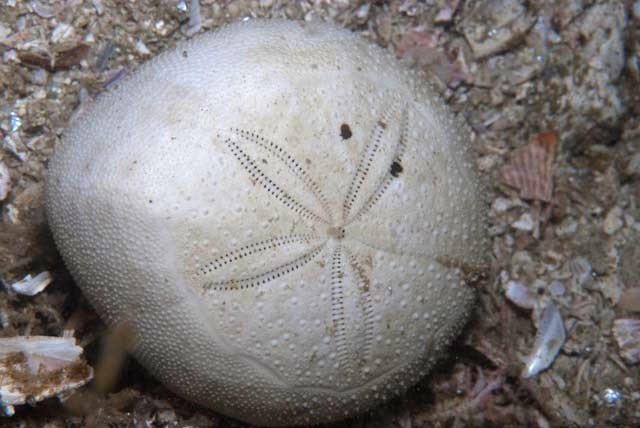
- Spatagobrissus mirabilis

Scientific classification
- Kingdom: Animalia
- Phylum: Echinodermata
- Class: Echinoidea
- Order: Spatangoida
- Family: Maretiidae
- Genus: Spatagobrissus; Clark, 1923

= Spatagobrissus =

Genus of sea urchins

Spatagobrissus is a genus of echinoderms belonging to the family Maretiidae.

The species of this genus are found in Southern Africa and Australia.

Species:

- Spatagobrissus dermodyorum Holmes, 2005
- Spatagobrissus incus Baker & Rowe, 1990
- Spatagobrissus laubei (Duncan, 1877)
- Spatagobrissus mirabilis Clark, 1923
