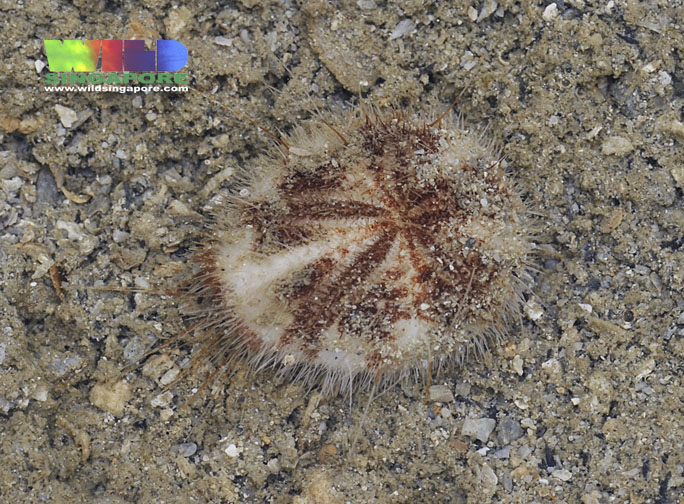
- Maretia planulata

Scientific classification
- Kingdom: Animalia
- Phylum: Echinodermata
- Class: Echinoidea
- Order: Spatangoida
- Family: Maretiidae
- Genus: Maretia; Gray, 1855

= Maretia =

Maretia Temporal range: Eocene - Recent

Genus of sea urchins

Maretia is a genus of heart urchins belonging to the family Spatangidae.

== Species ==
- Maretia carinata Bolau, 1873
- Maretia cordata Mortensen, 1948
- †Maretia estenozi Sánchez Roig, 1926
- Maretia planulata (Lamarck, 1816)

== Description ==
These sea urchins are irregular, as the mouth is located at the front of the underside of the animal, while the anus is located in rear end position.

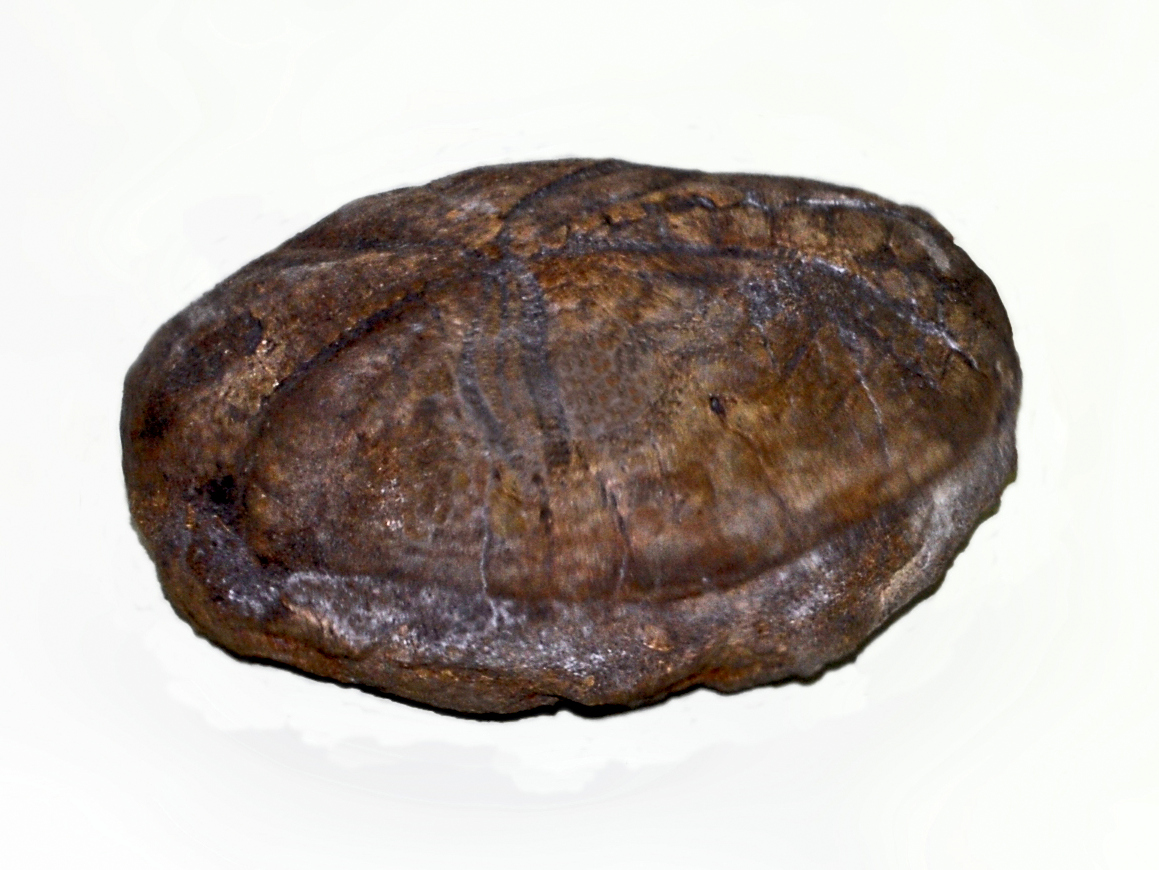
Fossil of Maretia pavesi from Miocene of Italy

== Fossil record ==
Fossils of Maretia are found in marine strata from the Eocene until the Quaternary (age range: from 40.4 to 0.012 million years ago.). Fossils are known from some localities in United Kingdom, United States, Germany, Spain, Cuba, Indonesia, New Zealand, and Eritrea and Greece.
