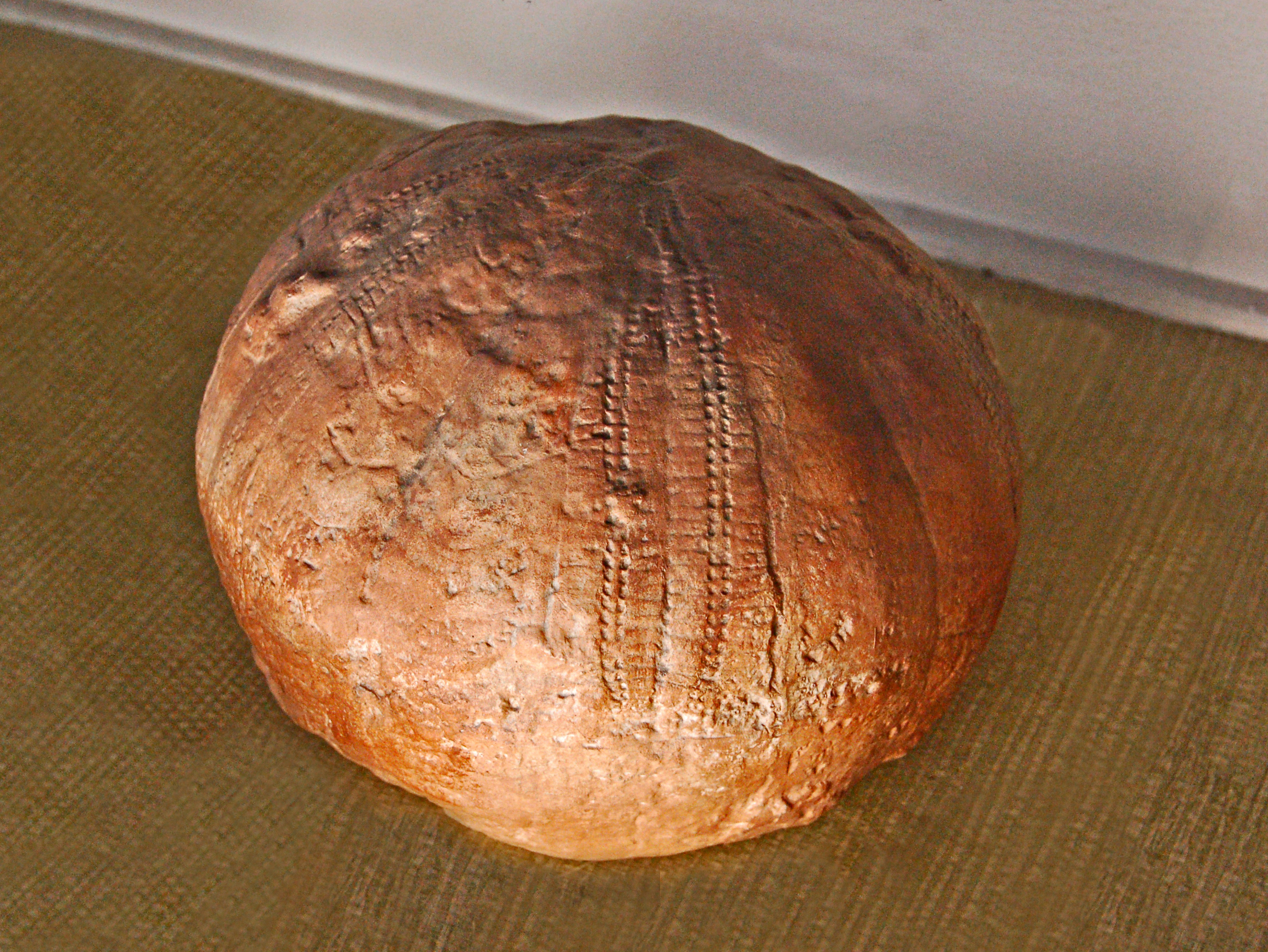
- Fossil of Prosostoma jimenoi from Cuba, on display at Galerie de paléontologie et d'anatomie comparée in Paris

Scientific classification
- Kingdom: Animalia
- Phylum: Echinodermata
- Class: Echinoidea
- Order: Spatangoida
- Family: †Asterostomatidae
- Genus: †Prosostoma; Pomel 1883

= Prosostoma =

Prosostoma Temporal range: Eocene, 55.8–33.9 Ma

Extinct genus of sea urchins

Prosostoma is an extinct genus of sea urchins belonging to the family Asterostomatidae.

These slow-moving shallow infaunal deposit feeder-detritivores lived during the Eocene of Cuba, from 55.8 to 33.9 Ma.

== Species ==
- Prosostoma jimenoi Cotteau 1870
