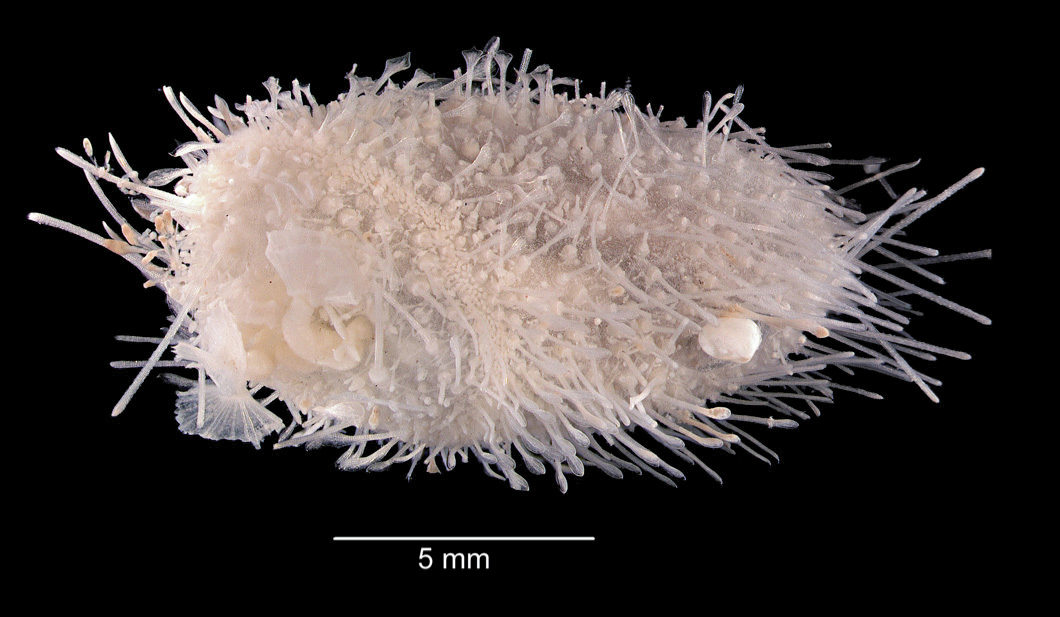
- Aeropsis rostrata (Wyville Thomson, 1877)

Conservation status
- Secure (NatureServe)

Scientific classification
- Kingdom: Animalia
- Phylum: Echinodermata
- Class: Echinoidea
- Order: Spatangoida
- Family: Aeropsidae
- Genus: Aeropsis
- Species: A. rostrata

Binomial name
- Aeropsis rostrata (Thomson, 1877)

= Aeropsis rostrata =

Species of sea urchin

Aeropsis rostrata is a species of sea urchin of the family Aeropsidae. Their armour is covered with spines. It is placed in the genus Aeropsis and lives in the sea. Aeropsis rostrata was first scientifically described in 1877 by Thomson.
