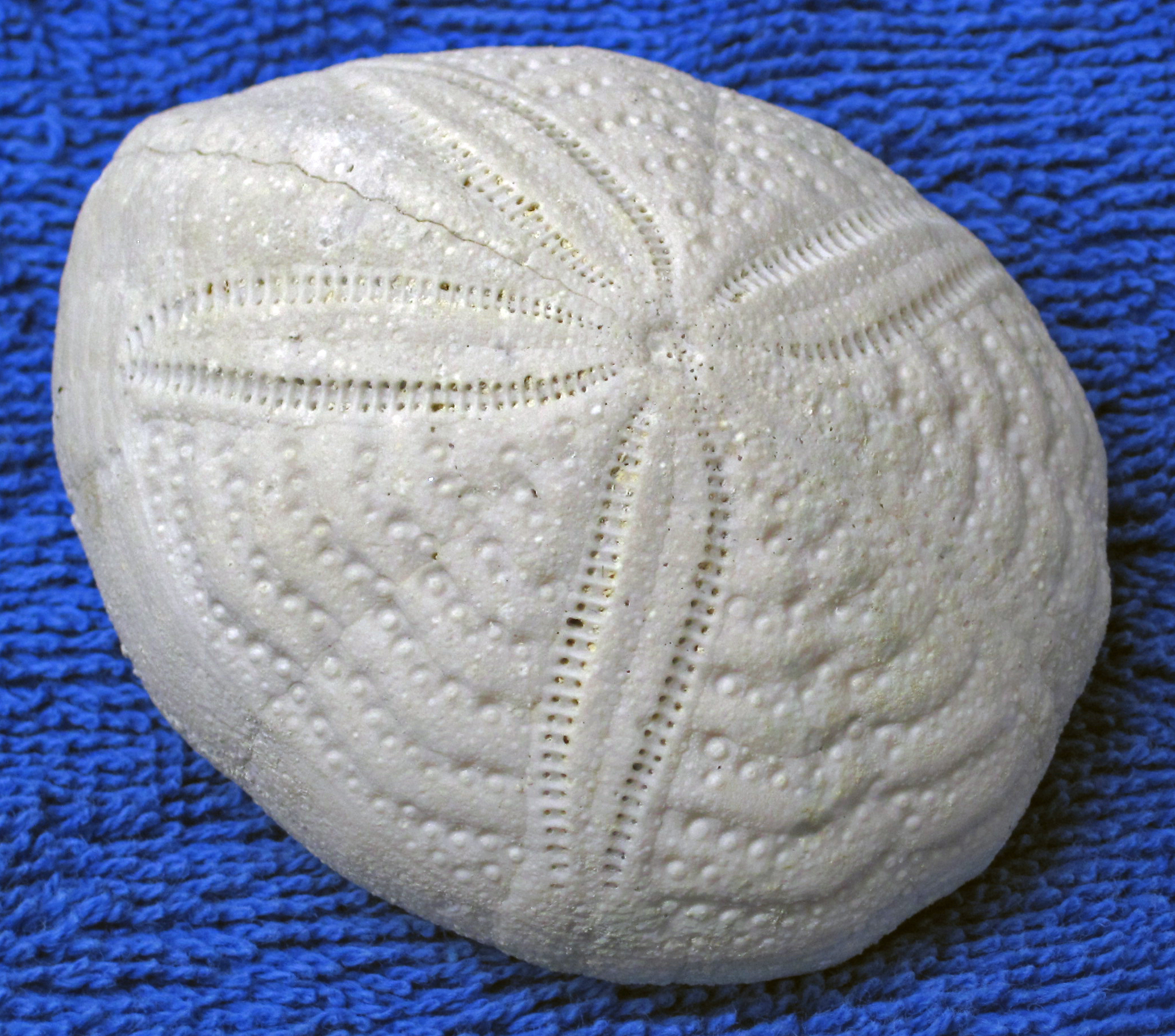
- Eupatagus mooreanus, fossil heart urchin

Scientific classification
- Kingdom: Animalia
- Phylum: Echinodermata
- Class: Echinoidea
- Order: Spatangoida
- Suborder: Brissidina
- Superfamily: Spatangoidea
- Family: Eupatagidae; Lambert, 1905

= Eupatagidae =

Family of sea urchins

Eupatagidae is a family of echinoderms belonging to the order Spatangoida.

Genera:

- Brissoides Schinz, 1825
- Eupatagus Agassiz, 1847
- Herreraster
- Heterospatangus
- Megapatagus
- Zanolettiaster
