= Platybrissus =

Scientific classification
- Kingdom: Animalia
- Phylum: Echinodermata
- Class: Echinoidea
- Order: Spatangoida
- Family: Eurypatagidae
- Genus: Platybrissus; Grube, 1866

Genus of sea urchins

Platybrissus is a genus of echinoderms belonging to the family Eurypatagidae.

The species of this genus are found in Malesia.

Species:

- Platybrissus ellipticus (Bolau, 1874)
- Platybrissus parvus H.L. Clark, 1945
- Platybrissus roemeri Grube, 1865
