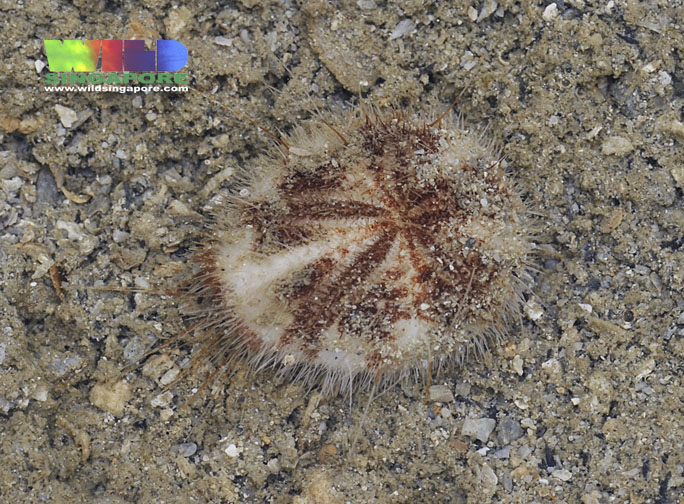
- Maretia planulata

Scientific classification
- Kingdom: Animalia
- Phylum: Echinodermata
- Class: Echinoidea
- Order: Spatangoida
- Family: Maretiidae; Lambert, 1905

= Maretiidae =

Family of sea urchins

Maretiidae is a family of echinoderms belonging to the order Spatangoida.

== Genera ==
Genera:

- Amoraster McNamara & Ah Yee, 1989
- Granobrissoides Lambert, 1920
- Gymnopatagus Döderlein, 1901
- Hemimaretia Mortensen, 1950
- Homolampas A. Agassiz, 1874
- Maretia Gray, 1855
- Mariania Airaghi, 1901
- Mazettia Lambert & Thiéry, 1915
- Murraypneustes Holmes, Yee & Krause, 2005
- Nacospatangus A. Agassiz, 1873
- Pycnolampas A. Agassiz & H.L. Clark, 1907
- Spatagobrissus H.L. Clark, 1923
- Tripatagus Zachos, 2012
