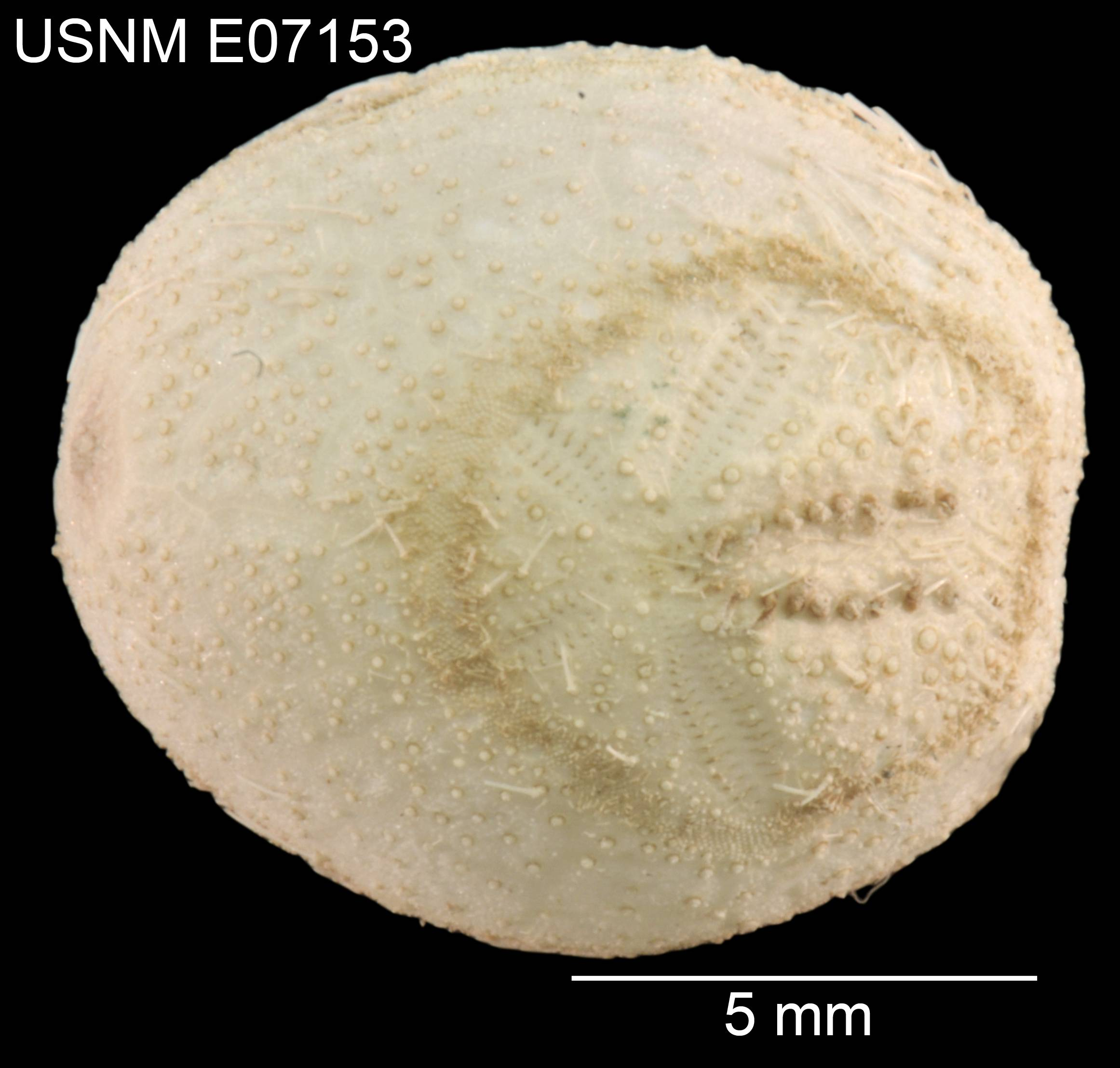
- Pericosmidae

Scientific classification
- Kingdom: Animalia
- Phylum: Echinodermata
- Class: Echinoidea
- Order: Spatangoida
- Suborder: Paleopneustina
- Superfamily: Paleopneustoidea
- Family: Pericosmidae; Lambert, 1905

= Pericosmidae =

Family of sea urchins

Pericosmidae is a family of echinoderms belonging to the order Spatangoida.

Genera:

- Faorina Gray, 1851
- Pericosmus L. Agassiz, 1847
- Platyspatus Pomel, 1883
- Sinaechinus
