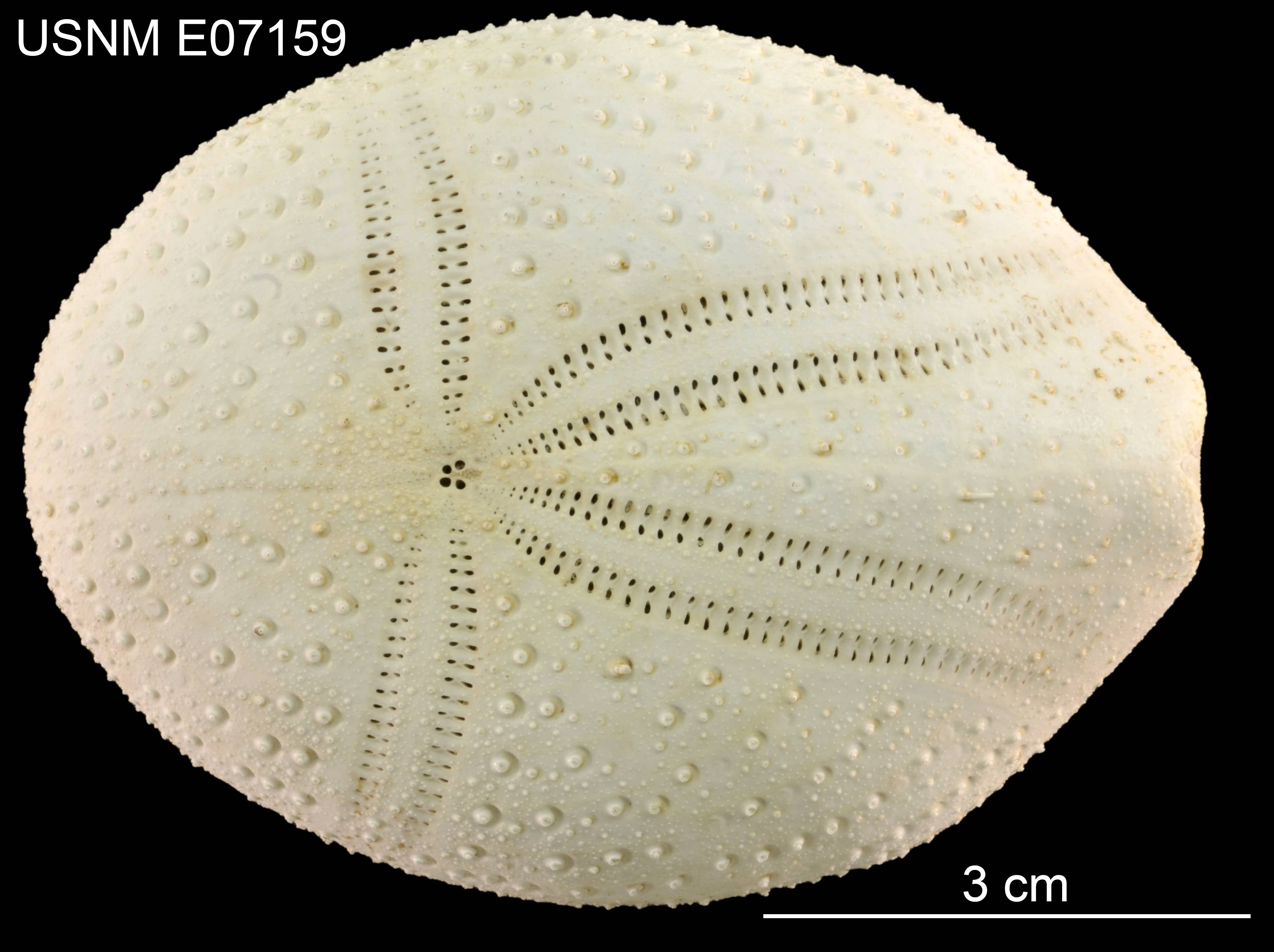
- Eurypatagus ovalis

Scientific classification
- Kingdom: Animalia
- Phylum: Echinodermata
- Class: Echinoidea
- Order: Spatangoida
- Suborder: Brissidina
- Superfamily: Spatangoidea
- Family: Eurypatagidae; Kroh, 2007

= Eurypatagidae =

Family of sea urchins

Eurypatagidae is a family of echinoderms belonging to the order Spatangoida.

Genera:

- Elipneustes Koehler, 1914
- Eurypatagus Mortensen, 1948
- Linopneustes A. Agassiz, 1881
- Paramaretia Mortensen, 1950
- Platybrissus Grube, 1866
