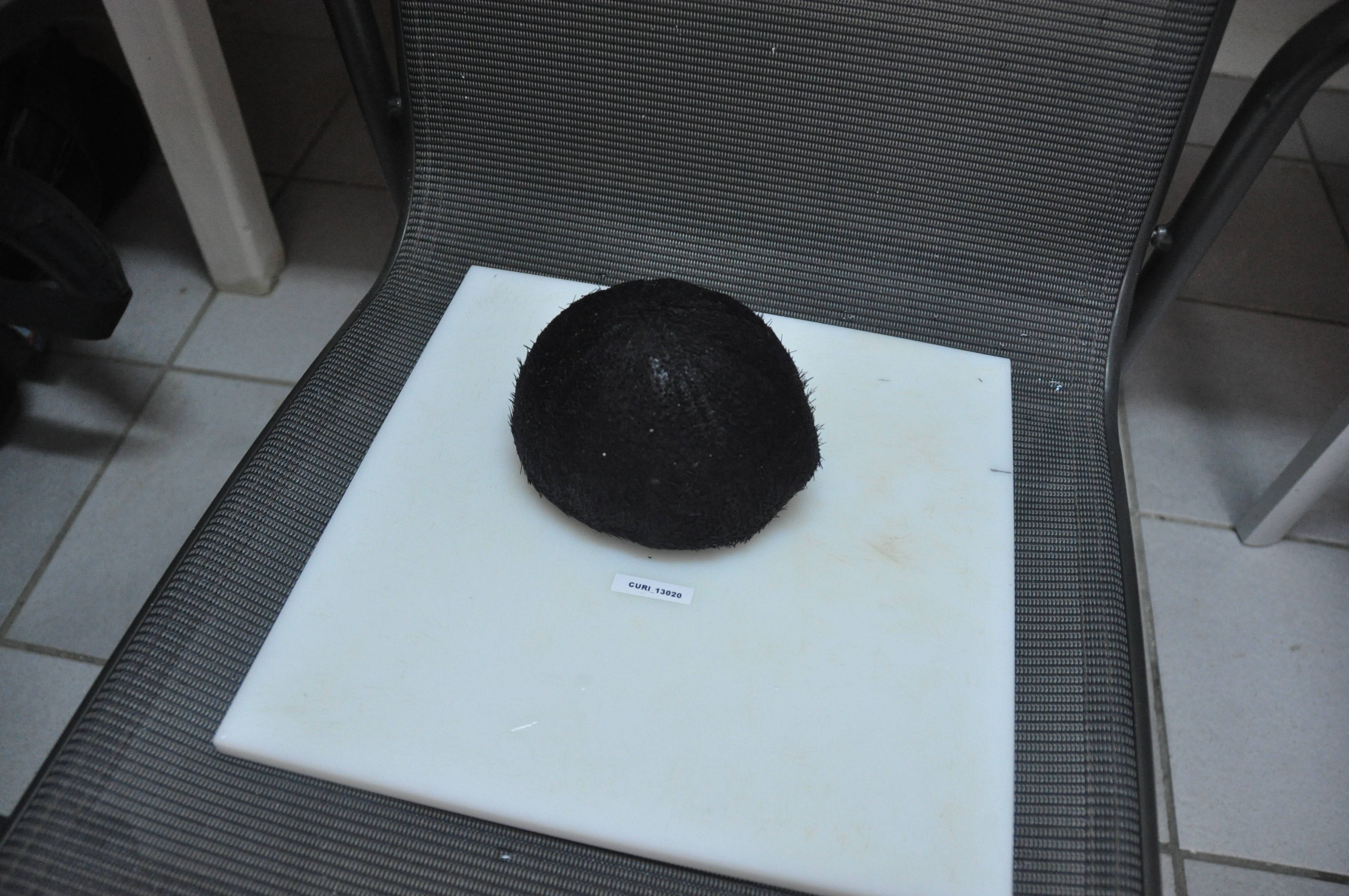
- Palaeopneustes

Scientific classification
- Kingdom: Animalia
- Phylum: Echinodermata
- Class: Echinoidea
- Order: Spatangoida
- Suborder: Paleopneustina
- Superfamily: Paleopneustoidea
- Family: Paleopneustidae; A. Agassiz, 1904

= Paleopneustidae =

Family of sea urchins

Paleopneustidae is a family of echinoderms belonging to the order Spatangoida.

Genera:

- Paleopneustes Agassiz, 1873
- Peripatagus Koehler, 1895
- Plesiozonus de Meijere, 1903
