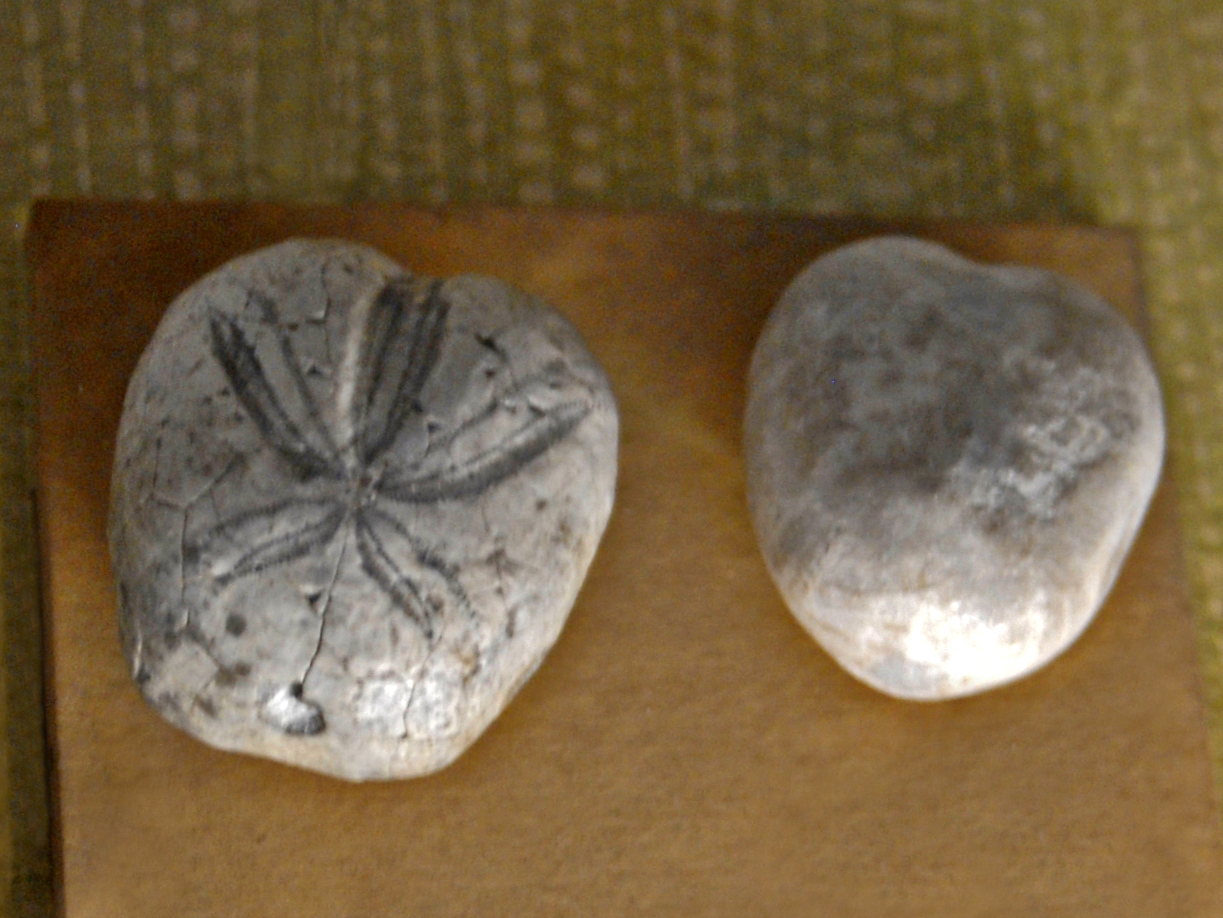
- Fossil of Heteraster oblongus from France, on display at Galerie de paléontologie et d'anatomie comparée in Paris

Scientific classification
- Kingdom: Animalia
- Phylum: Echinodermata
- Class: Echinoidea
- Order: Spatangoida
- Family: †Toxasteridae; J. Lambert, 1920

= Toxasteridae =

Toxasteridae Temporal range: Cretaceous

Extinct family of sea urchins

Toxasteridae is an extinct family of sea urchins.

These slow-moving shallow infaunal deposit feeder-detritivores lived during the Cretaceous period, from 145.5 to 61.7 Ma.

== Genera ==
- Adytaster
- Aphelaster
- Douvillaster
- Enallopneustes
- Heteraster
- Isaster
- Isomicraster
- Macraster
- Mokotibaster
- Palmeraster
- Polydesmaster
- Toxaster
