= Palaeostomatidae =

Scientific classification
- Domain: Eukaryota
- Kingdom: Animalia
- Phylum: Echinodermata
- Class: Echinoidea
- Order: Spatangoida
- Family: Palaeostomatidae; Lovén, 1868

Family of sea urchins

Palaeostomatidae is a family of echinoderms belonging to the order Spatangoida.

Genera:

- †Ditremaster Munier-Chalmas, 1885
- Palaeostoma Lovén in A. Agassiz, 1872
- Sarsiaster Mortensen, 1950
- †Trachyaster Pomel, 1869
