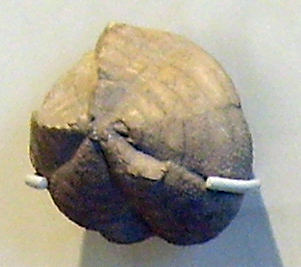

Scientific classification
- Kingdom: Animalia
- Phylum: Echinodermata
- Class: Echinoidea
- Order: Spatangoida
- Suborder: Micrasterina
- Family: Micrasteridae; Lambert, 1920

= Micrasteridae =

Family of sea urchins

Micrasteridae is a family of echinoderms belonging to the order Spatangoida.

== Genera ==
Genera:

- Brissopneustes
- Cyclaster Cotteau, 1856
- Diplodetus Schlüter, 1900
- Micraster
