= Palaeotropidae =

Scientific classification
- Kingdom: Animalia
- Phylum: Echinodermata
- Class: Echinoidea
- Order: Spatangoida
- Family: Palaeotropidae; Lambert, 1896

Family of sea urchins

Palaeotropidae is a family of echinoderms belonging to the order Spatangoida.

Genera:

- Kermabrissoides Baker, 1998
- Palaeobrissus A. Agassiz, 1883
- Palaeotropus Lovén, 1874
- Paleotrema Koehler, 1914
- Scrippsechinus Allison, Durham & Mintz, 1967
