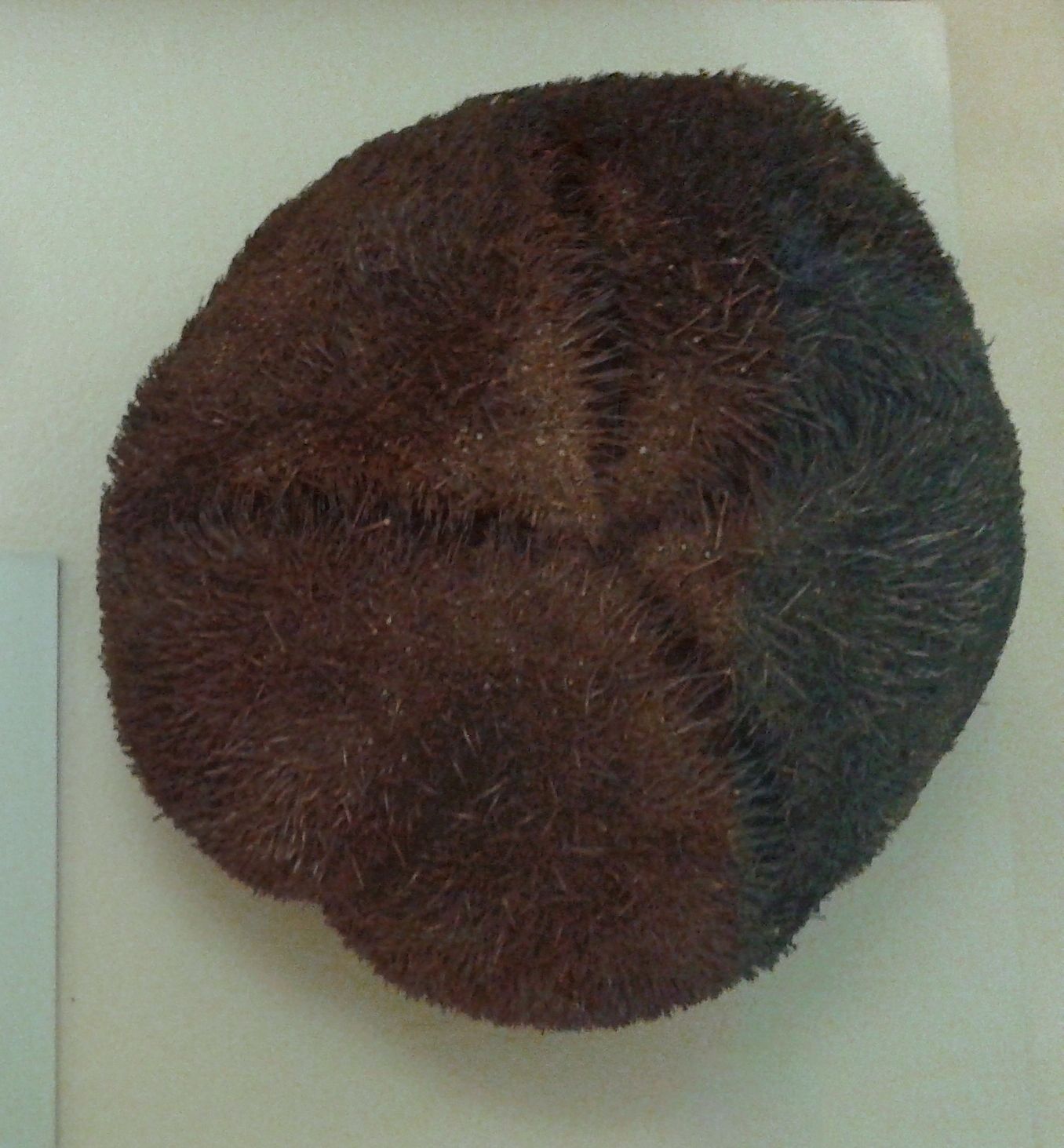

Scientific classification
- Kingdom: Animalia
- Phylum: Echinodermata
- Class: Echinoidea
- Order: Spatangoida
- Family: Brissidae
- Genus: Meoma
- Species: M. ventricosa

Binomial name
- Meoma ventricosa (Lamarck, 1816)

Synonyms
- Brissus panis Grube, 1857; Brissus ventricosus (Lamarck, 1816); Spatangus ventricosus Lamarck, 1816

= Meoma ventricosa =

Species of sea urchin

Meoma ventricosa, known by the common names cake urchin and red heart urchin, is a species of large sea urchins which live in shallow waters in the Caribbean. They may reach a diameter of twenty centimeters and are covered in reddish-brown spines. Specimens have both pentagonal radial symmetry and bilateral symmetry, giving them a sand-dollar appearance; however, two of the five sections are merged more closely than the others.

== Subspecies ==
There are two subspecies:

- Meoma ventricosa grandis Gray, 1851
- Meoma ventricosa ventricosa (Lamarck, 1816)

== Description ==
The red heart urchin has a somewhat flattened, heart-shaped test made of closely fitting, calcium carbonate plates. These are covered by short, dense, moveable spines situated on small tubercles. The test is a dark reddish-brown colour and the spines a little paler. Although it has pentagonal radial symmetry, it also has some degree of bilateral symmetry as one of the interambulacral areas is undeveloped and only four are apparent. The mouth is on the oral (under) surface near the anterior end and the anus at the posterior end.

== Distribution and habitat ==
The red heart urchin is found in the Caribbean Sea, the Bahamas, Florida and Bermuda. It inhabits reef flats, turtle grass beds, areas of coral fragments and deep reefs. It buries itself in the seabed choosing to inhabit sedimentary areas with sand, silt or coarse coral rubble. Its depth range is intertidal down to 200 metres (660 ft).

== Biology ==
Each sand grain in the marine environment has a film of algae and bacteria growing on its surface. The red heart urchin feeds on these films by swallowing sediment while it burrows under the surface of the substrate. Fifty six tube feet situated near the mouth form a disc and mucus causes the sand particles to adhere to it. The disc is then retracted into the mouth and the particles swallowed. They are passed through the gut and the nutritive matter extracted in the process. The urchin's growth rate is slow as it is limited both by the amount of organic material that can be extracted in this way and also by the lack of oxygen in the sediment, especially at night. To overcome this limitation, adult urchins often emerge onto the seabed at night and burrow down into the sediment again next day while juveniles remain permanently buried. During feeding, the large urchins disturb the substrate and increase its water content while decreasing its density. This has a considerable impact on the microhabitat and may be beneficial for the urchin as it results in an increase in the growth of the algae and bacteria forming the film round the particles of sediment.

The red heart urchin has few predators but is sometimes preyed on by stingrays and other fish, loggerhead turtles and the sea star Oreaster reticulatus. It can emit a noxious yellow exudate which repels fish and may even kill them. Several red heart urchins may aggregate and the progress of each one through the sediment can be observed by a depressed trail left behind as it progresses and a slight mound of coarser material above it. Red heart urchins burrow at the rate of 3 to 6 centimetres (1.2 to 2.4 in) an hour during the day and twice as fast as this at night.

In 1997, an epizootic event involving the red heart urchin occurred off the coast of Curaçao. It was established that the causative agent was a species of bacterium, Pseudoalteromonas. Affected urchins lost their spines and later died. It was found that the disease was largely confined to an area of a few square kilometres down-current from Willemstad harbour. It was suggested that polluted water caused an increase in bacteria-laden sediment and that consumption of this by the urchins caused their deaths.

In Florida, breeding takes place in the winter between August and February peaking between November and January. Spawning is not synchronized and fertilisation takes place in the water column. The larvae are planktonic and settle on the seabed in suitable sandy locations, perhaps guided there by chemical cues.

Most adults have a parasitic relationship with one or more small crabs of the species Dissodactylus primitivus. The crab lives on the urchin, usually inside or near its mouth.
