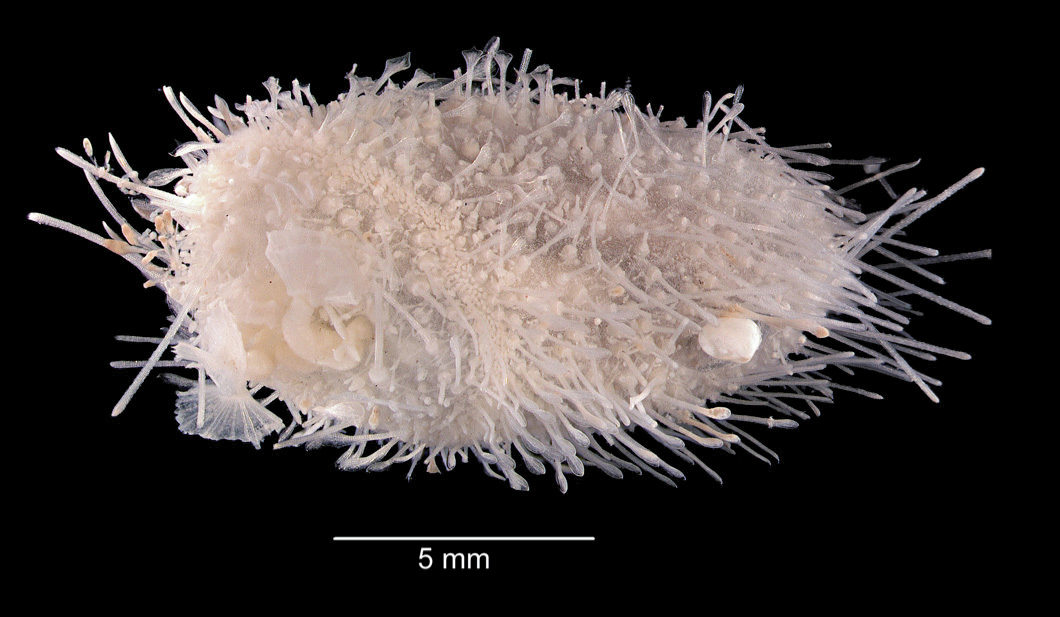
- Aeropsis rostrata

Scientific classification
- Kingdom: Animalia
- Phylum: Echinodermata
- Class: Echinoidea
- Order: Spatangoida
- Suborder: Micrasterina
- Family: Aeropsidae; Lambert, 1896

= Aeropsidae =

Family of sea urchins

Aeropsidae is a family of echinoderms belonging to the order Spatangoida. It contains one extant genus. There are also eight extinct genera, most of which fall in the subfamily Corasterinae.

== History ==
Initially, a large number of genera were included on the basis of their apetaloid ambulacra. This, however, resulted in the inclusion of a number of unrelated genera some of which are holasteroid, and others that are spatangoid. Later, Mortensen included just two genera - Aceste and Aeropsis. The two forms are very different in test architecture. Aceste is now considered to be an apetaloid derivative of Proraster and is nor believed to be closely related to Aeropsidae.

== Genera ==
The following genera are recognised:

Subfamily Corasterinae Lambert & Thiéry, 1924

- † Coraster Cotteau, 1887
- † Cordastrum Nisiyama, 1968
- † Cottreaucorys Lambert, 1920
- † Homoeaster Pomel, 1883
- † Lambertiaster Gauthier, 1892
- † Orthaster Moskvin, 1982
- † Physaster Pomel, 1883

No subfamily

- Aeropsis Mortensen, 1907
- † Sphenaster Jeffery, 1999 (Protaeropsis was suggested as an alternative by Doweld in 2016 as Sphenaster is a junior homonym of Sphenaster Wilcoxon, 1970, a fossil protist genus (Haptomonada).
