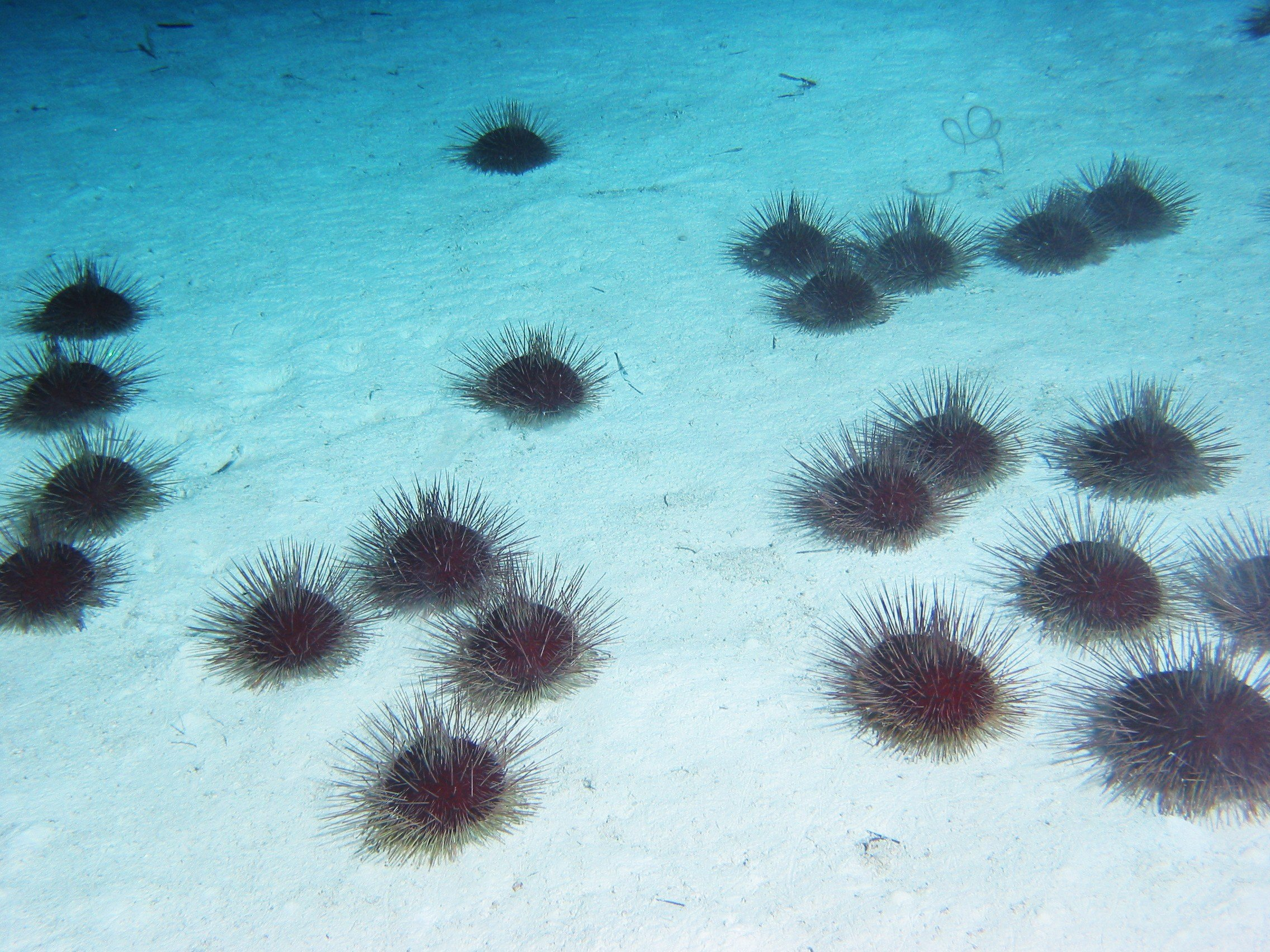
- Heterobrissus hystrix

Scientific classification
- Kingdom: Animalia
- Phylum: Echinodermata
- Class: Echinoidea
- Order: Spatangoida
- Genus: Heterobrissus; Manzoni & Mazzetti, 1878

= Heterobrissus =

Genus of sea urchins

Heterobrissus is a genus of echinoderms belonging to the order Spatangoida, family unknown.

Species:

- Heterobrissus erinaceus Baker & Rowe, 1990
- Heterobrissus gigas Baker & Rowe, 1990
- Heterobrissus hemingi (Anderson, 1902)
- Heterobrissus hystrix (A. Agassiz, 1880)
- Heterobrissus niasicus (Döderlein, 1901)
