= Hemiasteridae =

Scientific classification
- Kingdom: Animalia
- Phylum: Echinodermata
- Class: Echinoidea
- Order: Spatangoida
- Family: Hemiasteridae; H.L. Clark, 1917

Family of echinoderms

Hemiasteridae is a family of echinoderms belonging to the order Spatangoida.

== Genera ==
Genera:

- Bolbaster Pomel, 1869
- Cheopsia Fourtau, 1909
- Hemiaster Agassiz, 1847
- Palhemiaster Lambert, 1916
