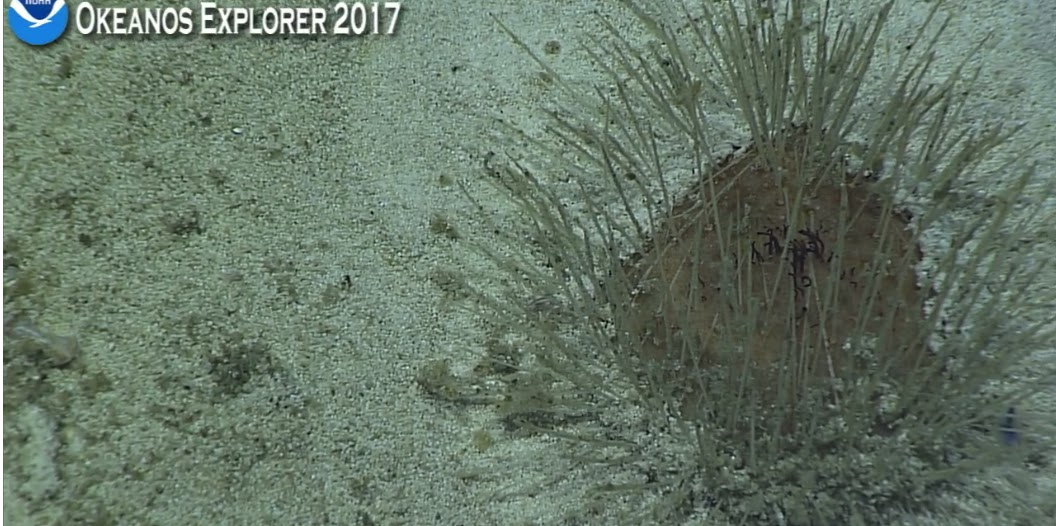
- Phrissocystis

Scientific classification
- Kingdom: Animalia
- Phylum: Echinodermata
- Class: Echinoidea
- Order: Spatangoida
- Family: Macropneustidae; Lambert, 1905

= Macropneustidae =

Family of sea urchins

Macropneustidae is a family of echinoderms belonging to the order Spatangoida.

Genera:

- Archaechinus Kier, 1957
- Argopatagus A. Agassiz, 1879
- Crucibrissus Lambert, 1920
- Hypsopatagus Pomel, 1883
- Lajanaster
- Macropneustes L. Agassiz, 1847
- Phrissocystis A. Agassiz, 1898
