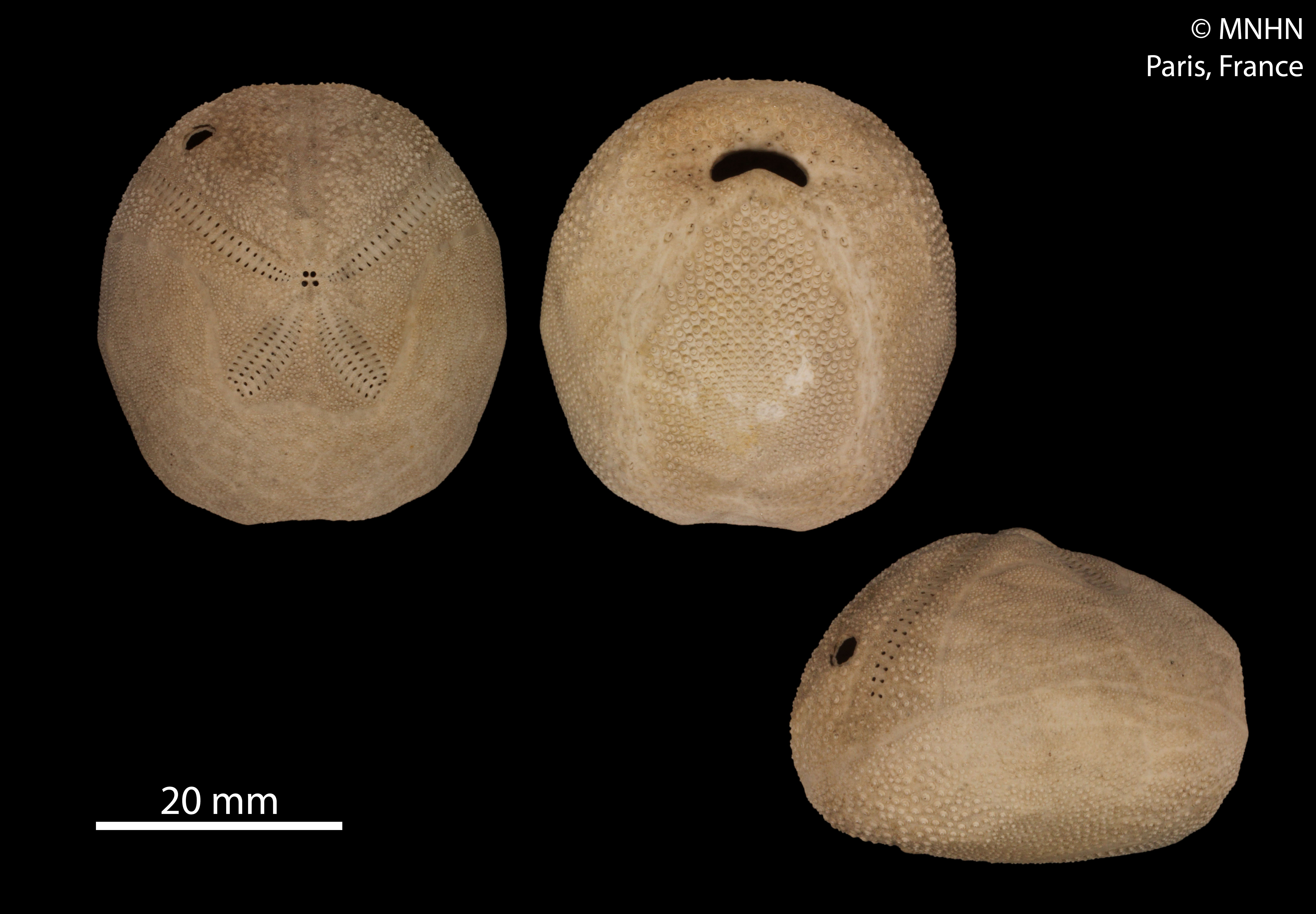
- Agassizia scrobiculata

Scientific classification
- Kingdom: Animalia
- Phylum: Echinodermata
- Class: Echinoidea
- Order: Spatangoida
- Suborder: Paleopneustina
- Family: Prenasteridae; Lambert, 1905

= Prenasteridae =

Family of sea urchins

Prenasteridae is a family of echinoderms belonging to the order Spatangoida.

Genera:

- Agassizia Valenciennes, 1846
- Anisaster Pomel, 1886
- Antiquobrissus Szörényi, 1955
- Cagaster Nisiyama, 1968
- Eoagassizia Grant & Hertlein, 1938
- Holcopneustes Cotteau, 1889
- Peribrissus Pomel, 1869
- Prenaster Desor, 1853
- Pseudolinthia
- Tripylus Philippi, 1845
