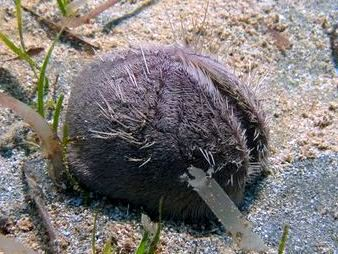
- Spatangus purpureus

Scientific classification
- Kingdom: Animalia
- Phylum: Echinodermata
- Class: Echinoidea
- Subclass: Euechinoidea
- Infraclass: Irregularia
- Superorder: Atelostomata
- Order: Spatangoida; L. Agassiz, 1840

Suborders
- Brissidina; Micrasterina; Paleopneustina

= Spatangoida =

Heart urchins Temporal range: Lower Cretaceous–recent

Order of sea urchins

The heart urchins are members of the order Spatangoida of sea urchins. Their body are somewhat elongated ovals in form, and are distinguished by the mouth being placed towards one end of the animal, and the anus towards the other. As a result, unlike most other sea urchins, heart urchins are bilaterally symmetrical, and have a distinct anterior surface. The presence and position of the mouth and anus typically give members of this group the distinct "heart" shape from which they get their common name. Heart urchins have no feeding lantern, and often have petaloids sunk into grooves. They are a relatively diverse order, with a number of varying species.

== Taxonomy ==
According to World Register of Marine Species :

- suborder Brissidina Stockley, Smith, Littlewood, Lessios & MacKenzie-Dodds, 2005
  - family Asterostomatidae Pictet, 1857
  - family Brissidae Gray, 1855
  - family Palaeotropidae Lambert, 1896
  - superfamily Spatangoidea Fischer, 1966
    - family Eupatagidae Lambert, 1905
    - family Eurypatagidae Kroh, 2007
    - family Loveniidae Lambert, 1905
    - family Macropneustidae Lambert, 1905
    - family Maretiidae Lambert, 1905
    - family Megapneustidae Fourtau, 1905 †
    - family Spatangidae Gray, 1825
- family Hemiasteridae H. L. Clark, 1917
- suborder Micrasterina Fischer, 1966
  - family Aeropsidae Lambert, 1896
  - family Micrasteridae Lambert, 1920a
- family Palaeostomatidae Lovén, 1868
- suborder Paleopneustina Markov & Solovjev, 2001
  - superfamily Paleopneustoidea A. Agassiz, 1904
    - family Paleopneustidae A. Agassiz, 1904
    - family Pericosmidae Lambert, 1905
  - family Prenasteridae Lambert, 1905
  - family Schizasteridae Lambert, 1905
- family Somaliasteridae Wagner & Durham, 1966a †
- family Toxasteridae Lambert, 1920a †
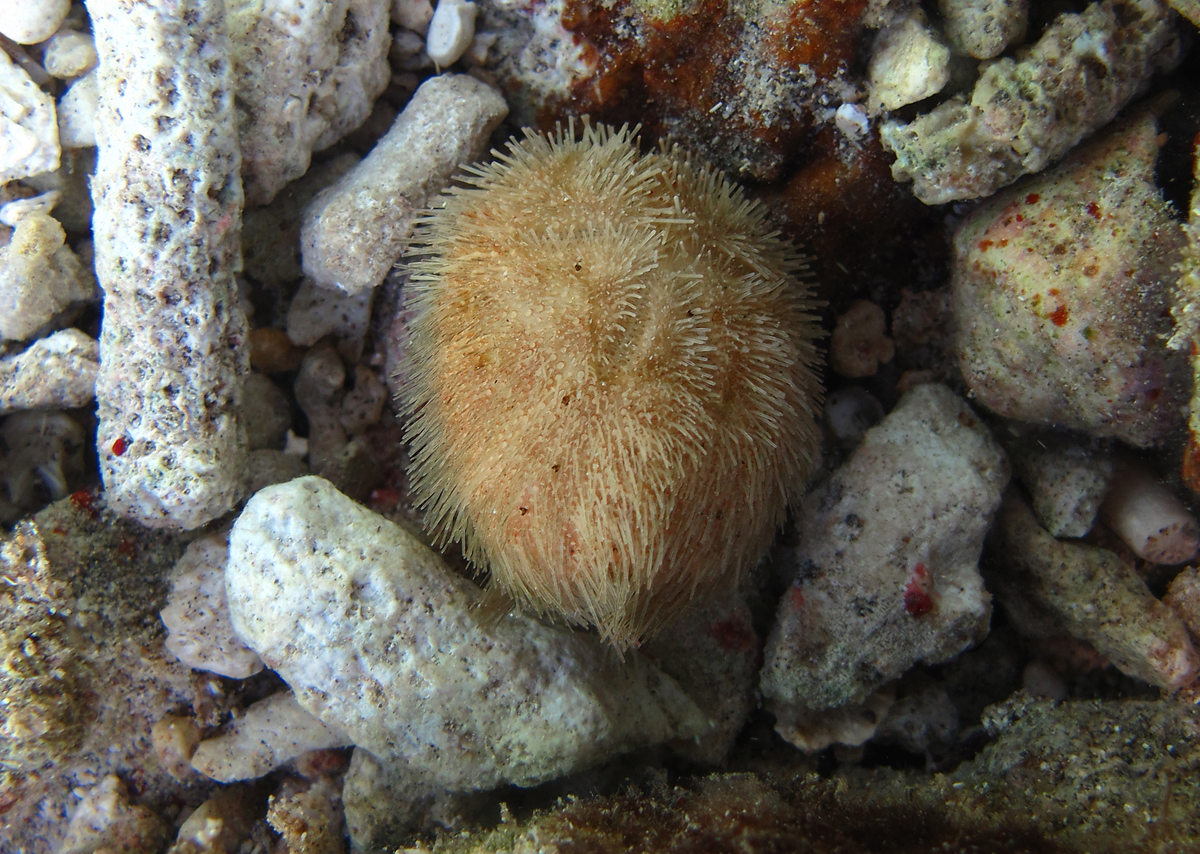
Brissus latecarinatus (Brissidae)

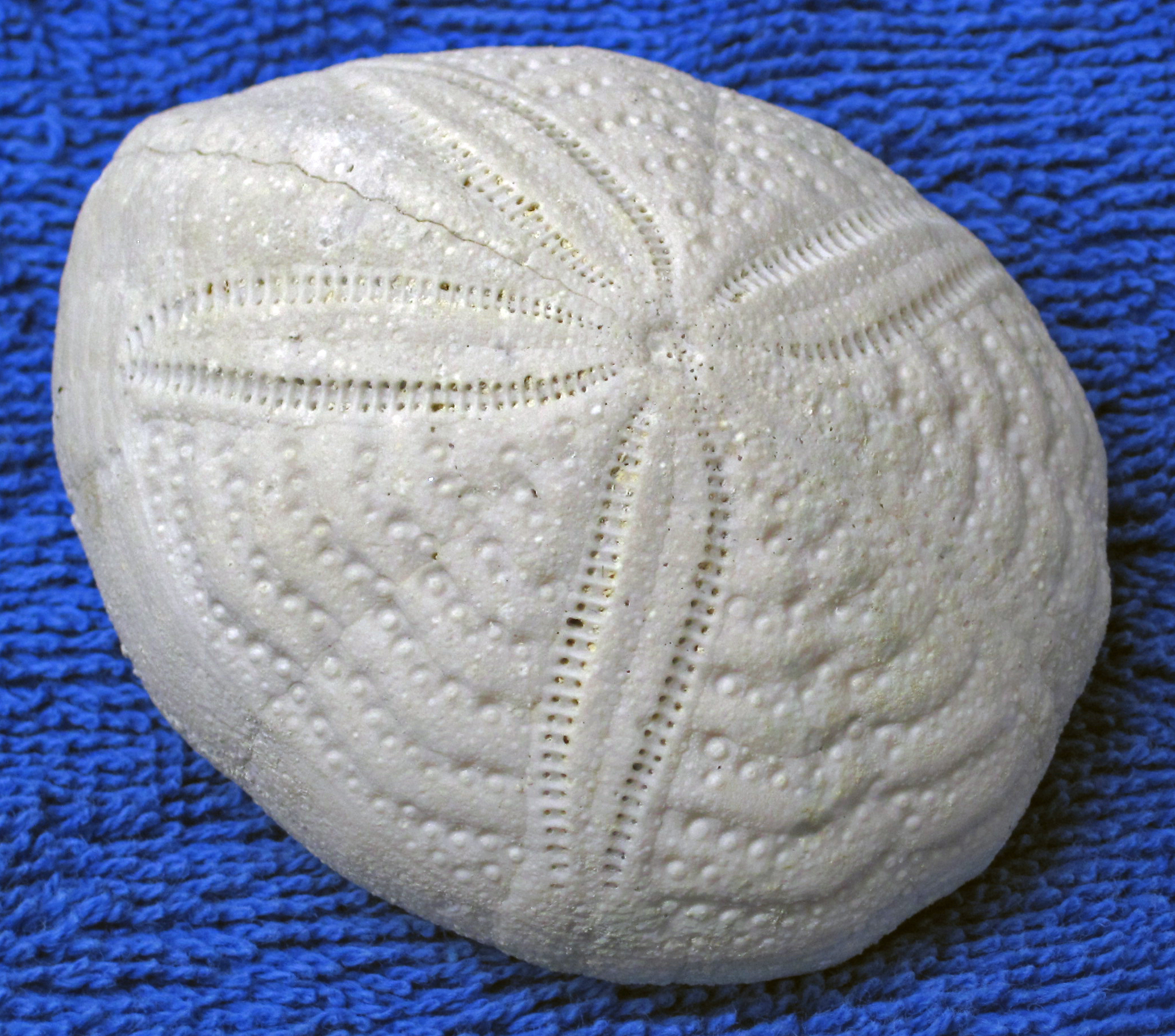
Eupatagus mooreanus (Eupatagidae)

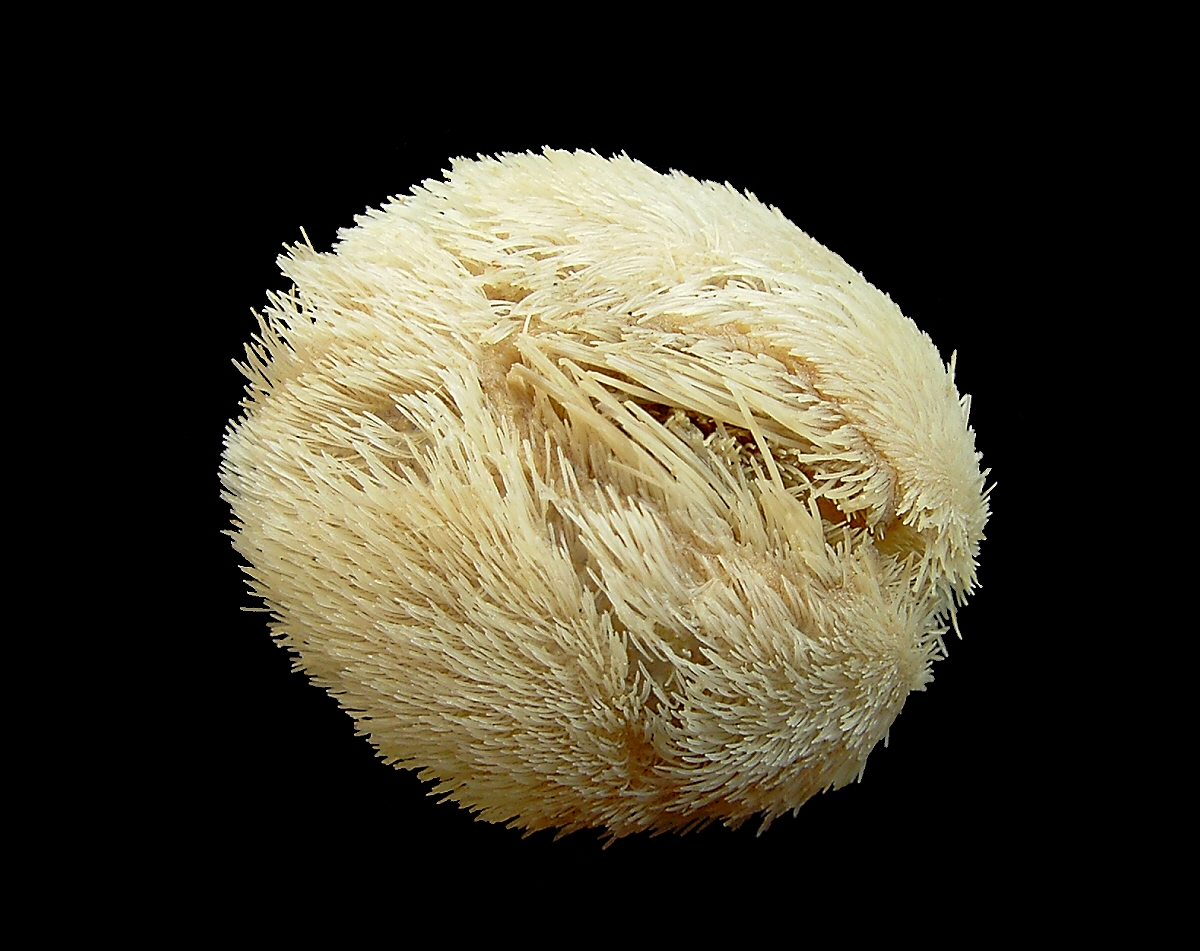
Echinocardium cordatum (Loveniidae)

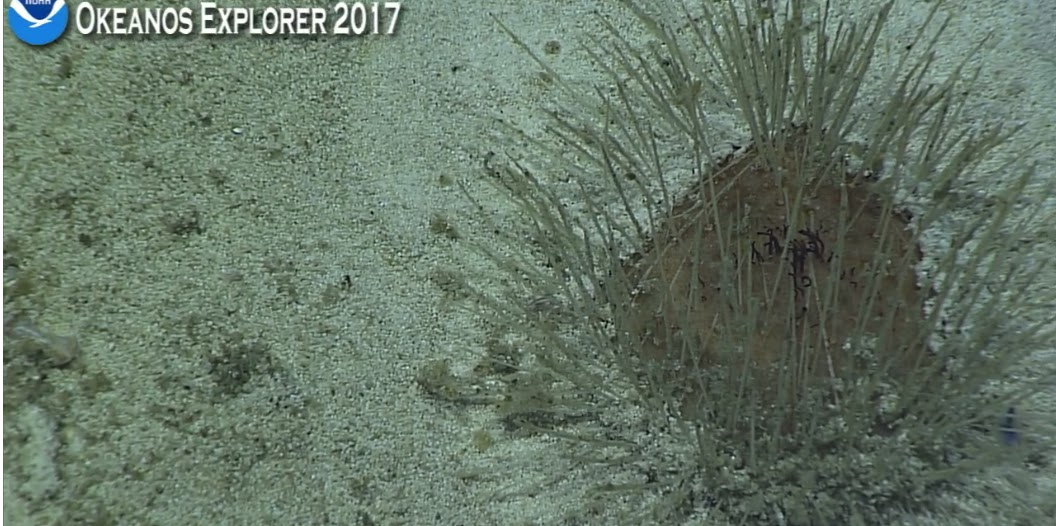
Phrissocystis sp. (Macropneustidae)

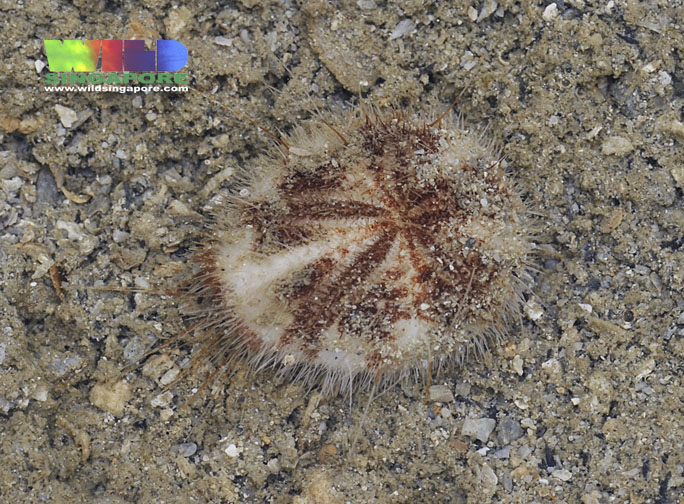
Maretia planulata (Maretiidae)

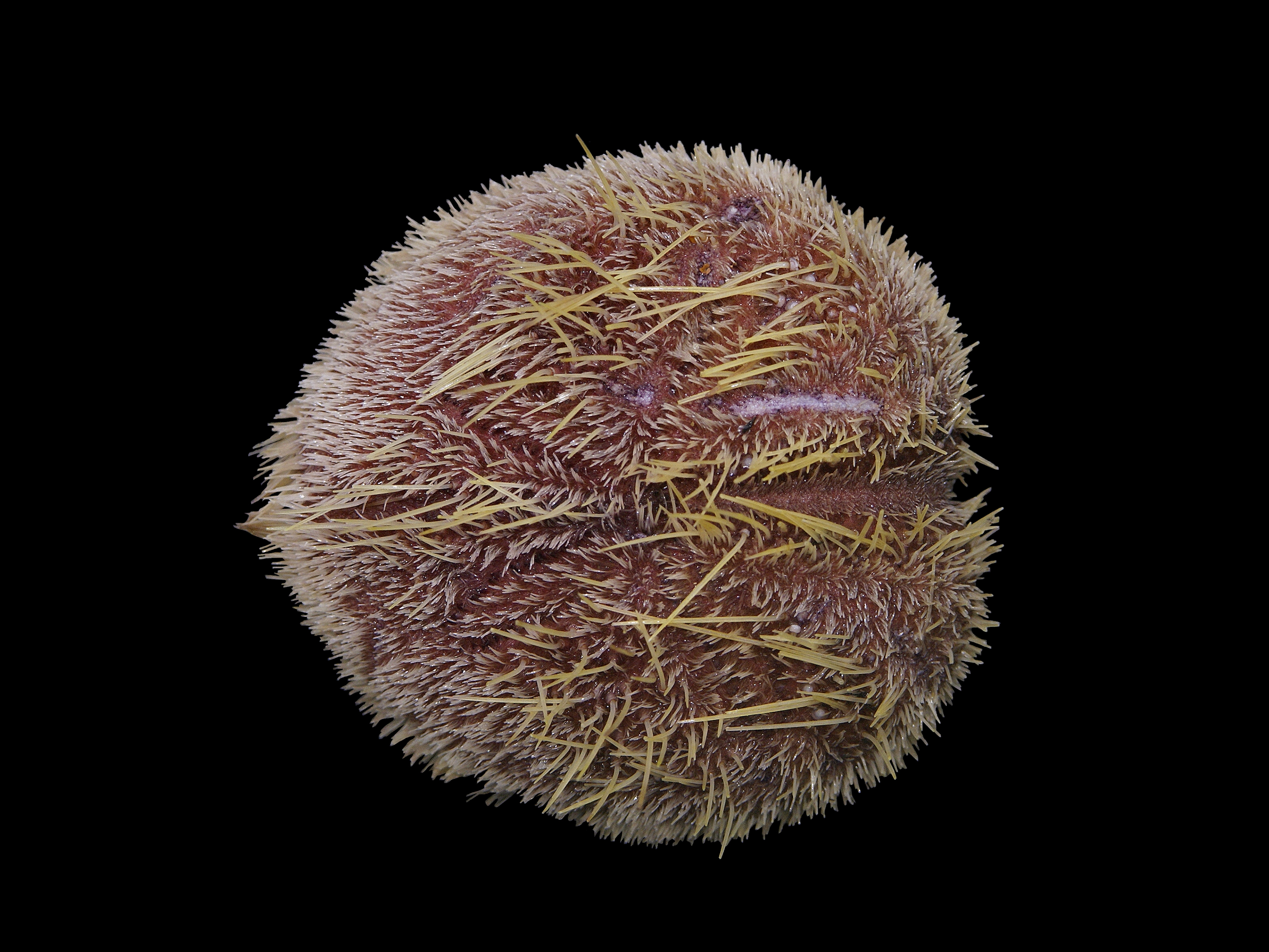
Spatangus purpureus (Spatangidae)

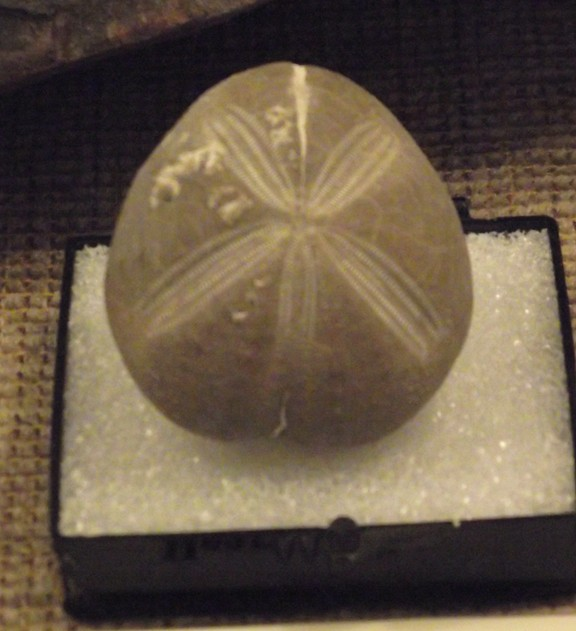
Fossil of Palhemiaster comanchei (Hemiasteridae)

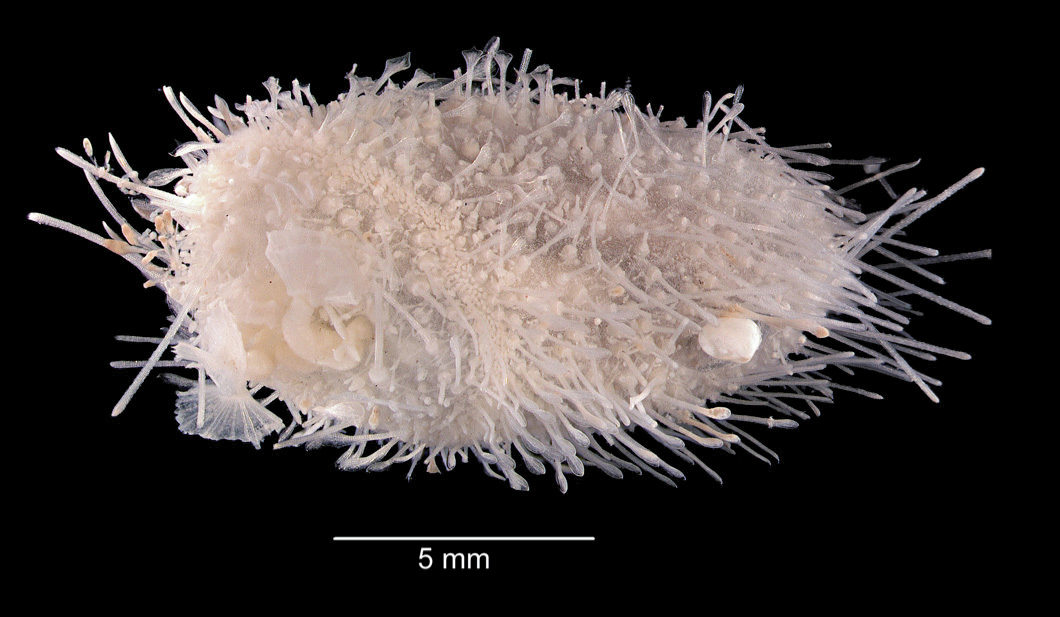
Aeropsis rostrata (Aeropsidae)

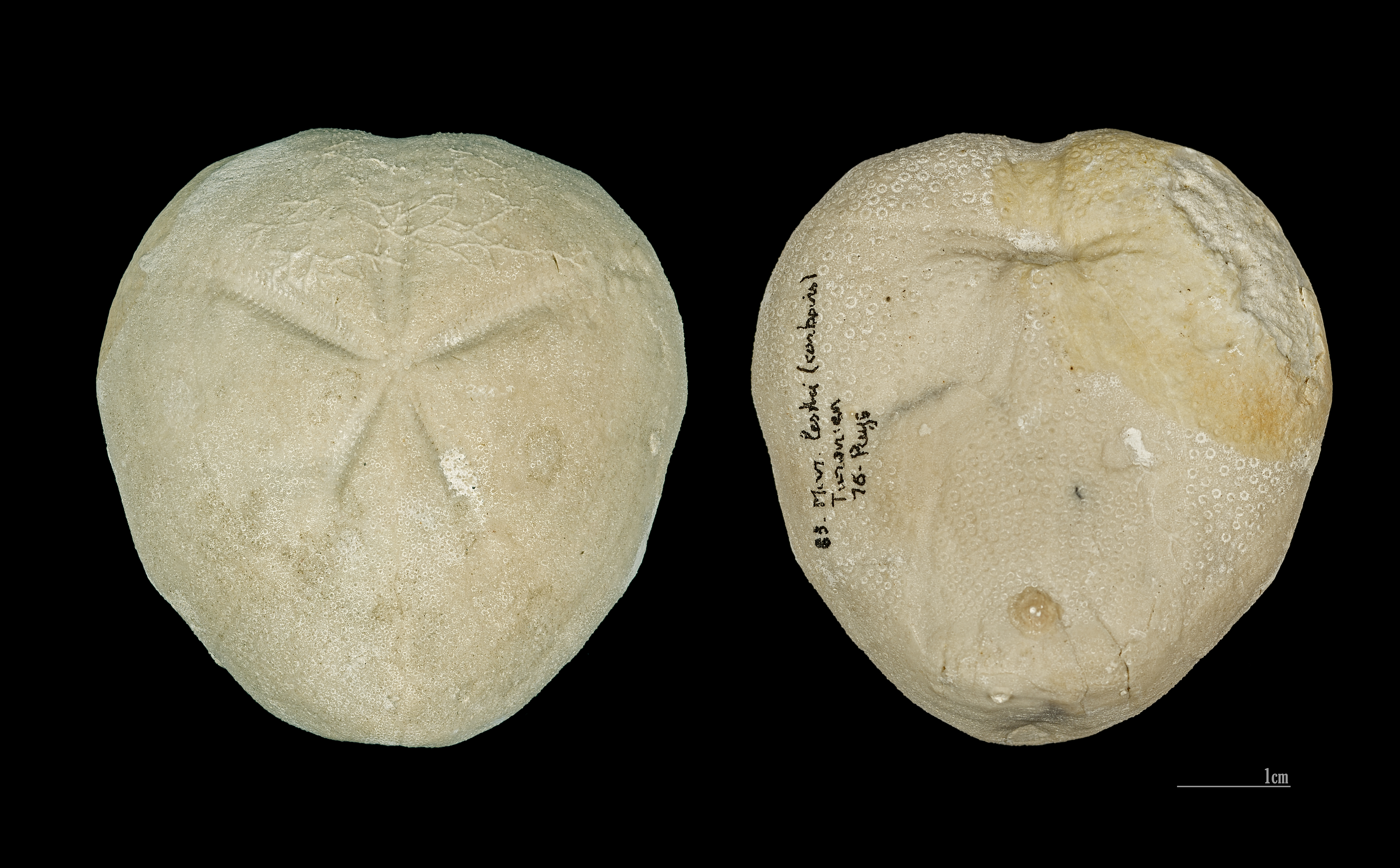
Fossil of Micraster leskei (Micrasteridae)

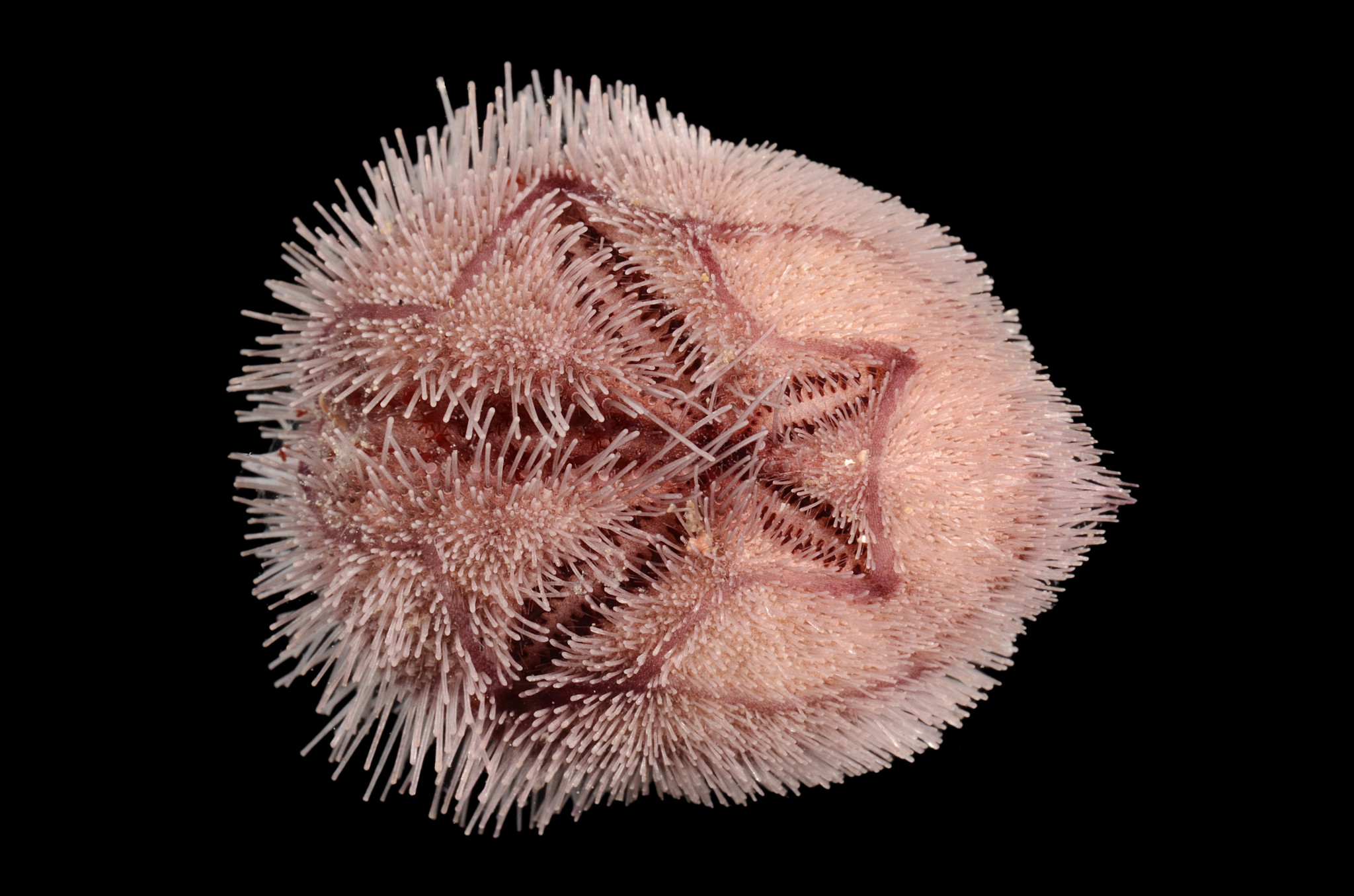
Prymnaster investigatoris (Schizasteridae)

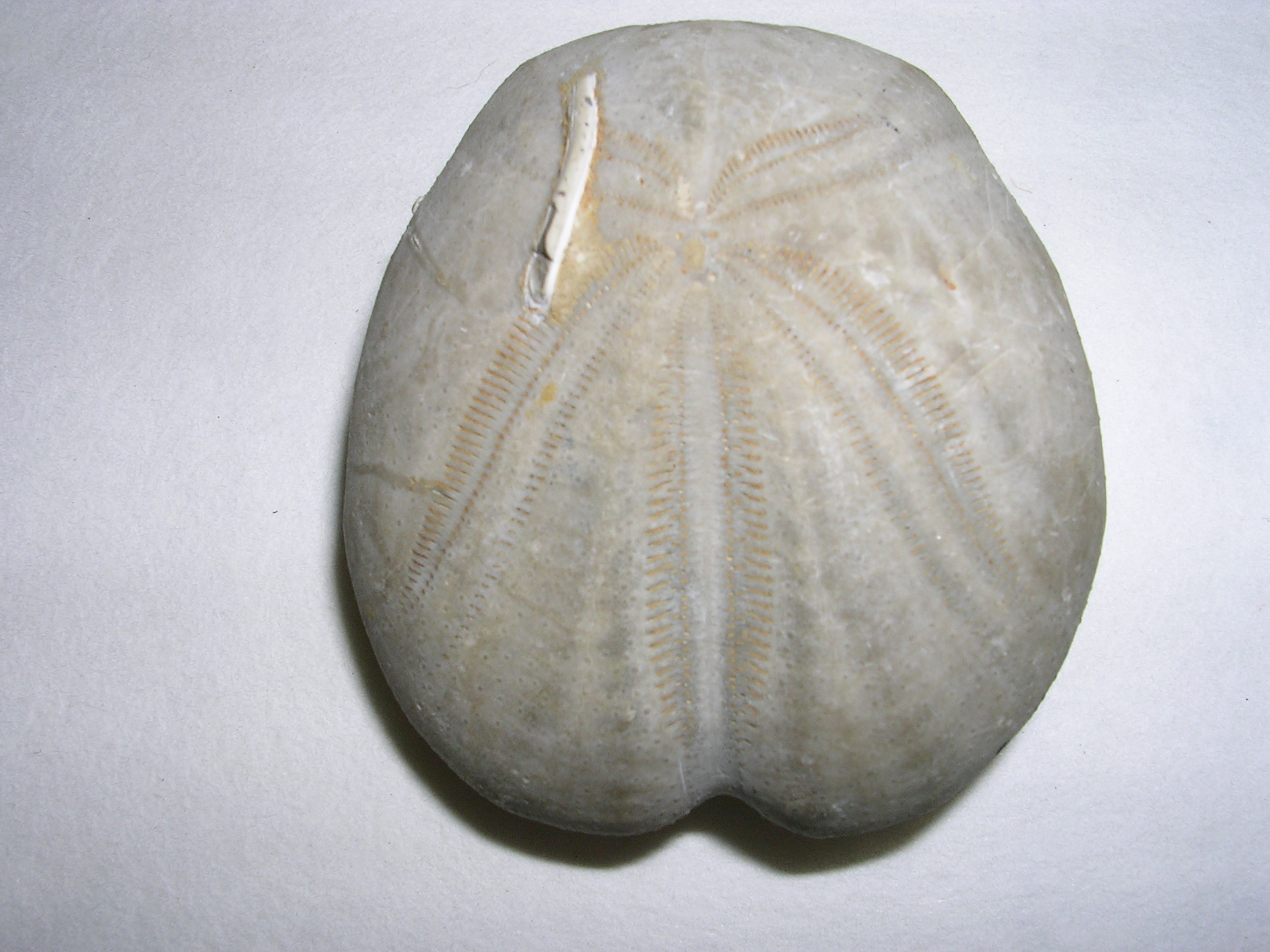
Fossil of Heteraster oblongus (Toxasteridae)

== See also ==
- Abatus agassizii
- Meoma ventricosa
