= A. elongatus =

A. elongatus may refer to:

- Abacetus elongatus, a ground beetle
- Abatus elongatus, a synonym of Abatus koehleri, a sea urchin
- Aborichthys elongatus, a freshwater fish found in India
- Acheilognathus elongatus, the elongate bitterling, a freshwater fish found in China
- Adventor elongatus, the visitor, a marine fish found in the Pacific Ocean along the coasts of Papua New Guinea and Australia
- Afristreptaxis elongatus, a land snail found in Africa
- Agabus elongatus, a predaceous diving beetle found in North America and the Palearctic
- Aglymbus elongatus, a predaceous diving beetle
- Alcichthys elongatus, a marine fish found in the northwestern Pacific Ocean
- Allosmerus elongatus, a marine fish found in the northeastern Pacific Ocean
- Ambassis elongatus, the yellow-fin perchlet, a freshwater fish found in Australia
- Amphiglossus elongatus, a synonym of Flexiseps elongatus, a skink found in Madagascar
- Anisopodus elongatus, a longhorn beetle
- Anthonomus elongatus, a weevil found in North America
- Archips elongatus, a moth found in China
- Argentinolycus elongatus, a marine fish found off southeast South America
- Artocarpus elongatus, a synonym of Sloetia elongata, a tree native to southeast Asia
- Aster elongatus, a synonym of Solidago elongata, a plant found in North America
- Austropyrgus elongatus, a freshwater snail found in Tasmania
- Avitomyrmex elongatus, a prehistoric bulldog ant
