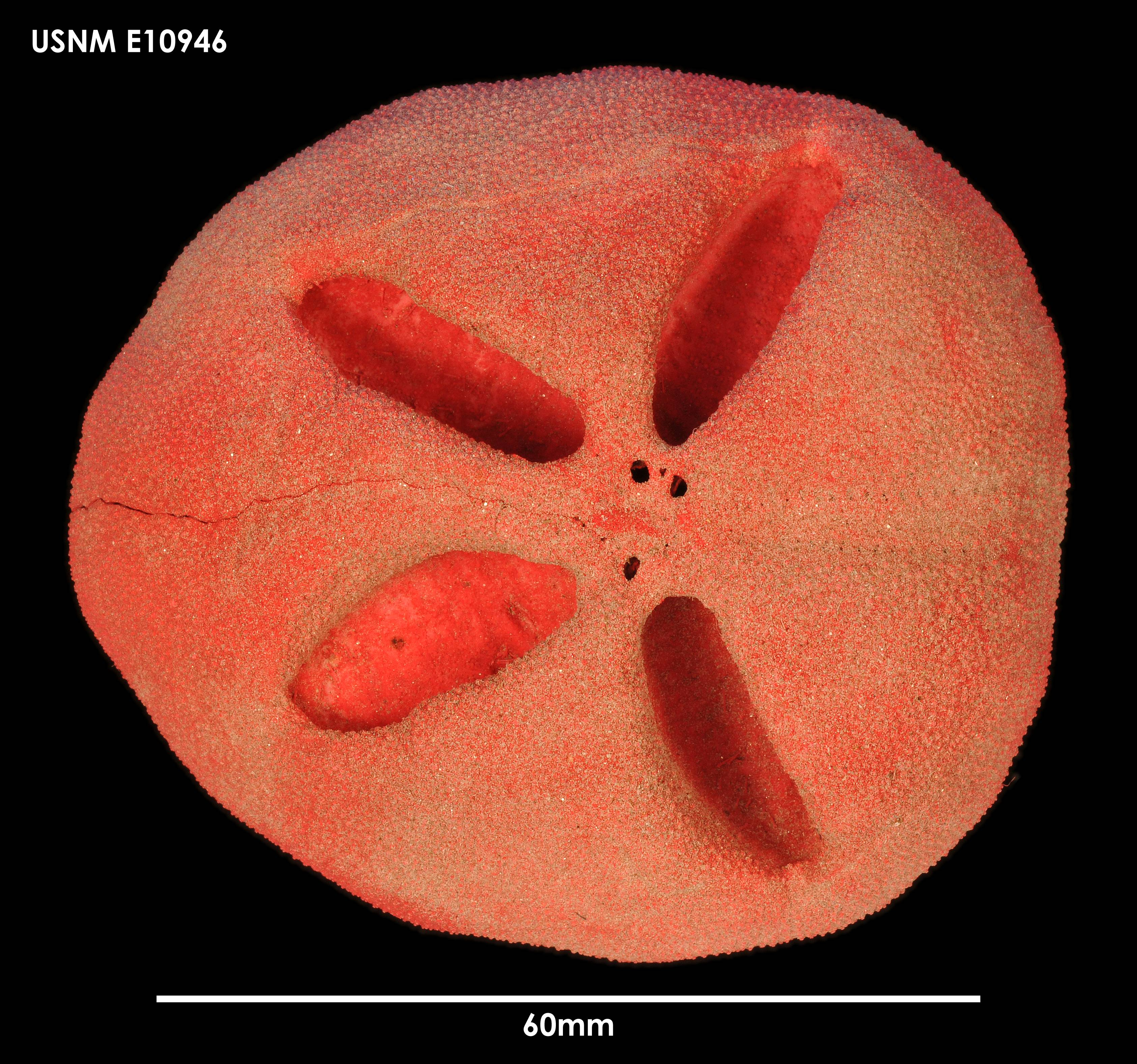

Scientific classification
- Domain: Eukaryota
- Kingdom: Animalia
- Phylum: Echinodermata
- Class: Echinoidea
- Order: Spatangoida
- Family: Schizasteridae
- Genus: Abatus
- Species: A. koehleri

Binomial name
- Abatus koehleri (Thiéry, 1909)

Synonyms
- Abatus elongatus (Koehler, 1908); Hemiaster elongatus Koehler, 1908; Hemiaster koehleri Thiéry 1909

= Abatus koehleri =

Species of sea urchin

Abatus koehleri is a species of sea urchin of the family Schizasteridae. Their armour is covered with spines. It was first scientifically described in 1908 by Koehler. It is known from the South Orkneys.

== See also ==
- Abatus cordatus
- Abatus curvidens
- Abatus ingens
