= A. cordatus =

A. cordatus may refer to:

- Abacetus cordatus, a ground beetle
- Abatus cordatus, a sea urchin
