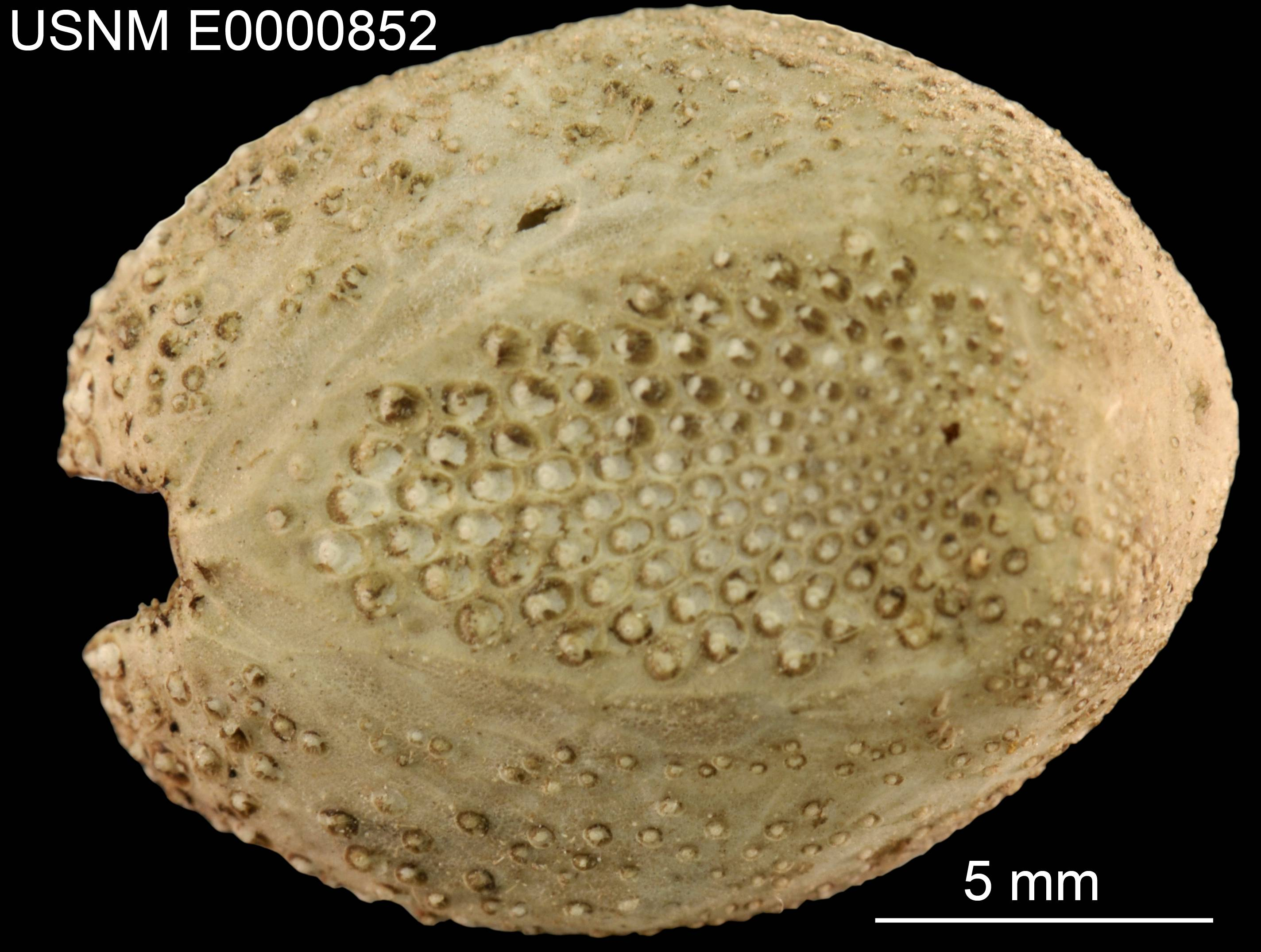

Scientific classification
- Domain: Eukaryota
- Kingdom: Animalia
- Phylum: Echinodermata
- Class: Echinoidea
- Order: Spatangoida
- Family: Schizasteridae
- Genus: Aceste
- Species: A. ovata

Binomial name
- Aceste ovata (Agassiz & Clark, 1907)

= Aceste ovata =

Species of sea urchin

Aceste ovata is a species of sea urchin of the family Schizasteridae. Their armour is covered with spines. It came from the genus Aceste and lives in the sea. Aceste ovata was first scientifically described in 1907 by Alexander Emanuel Agassiz & Hubert Lyman Clark.
