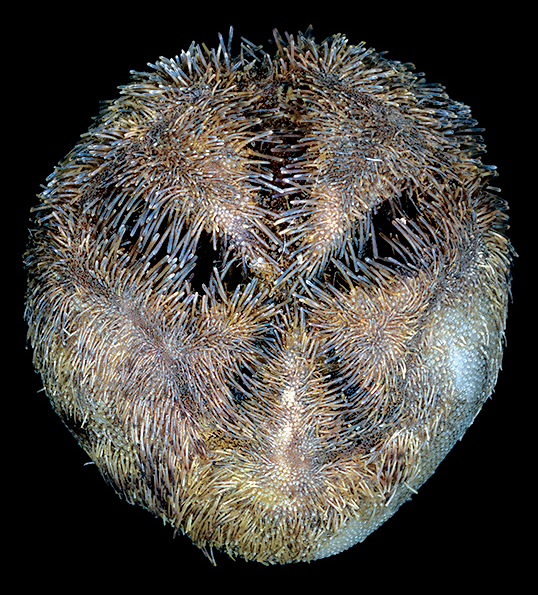
- C. Aboral view of Abatus philippii Lovén, 1871

Scientific classification
- Domain: Eukaryota
- Kingdom: Animalia
- Phylum: Echinodermata
- Class: Echinoidea
- Order: Spatangoida
- Family: Schizasteridae
- Genus: Abatus
- Species: A. philippii

Binomial name
- Abatus philippii (Lovén, 1871)

= Abatus philippii =

Species of sea urchin

Abatus philippii is a species of sea urchin of the family Schizasteridae. Their armour is covered with spines. It is in the genus Abatus and lives in the oceans of the southern hemisphere. Abatus philippii was first scientifically described in 1871 by Sven Lovén.
