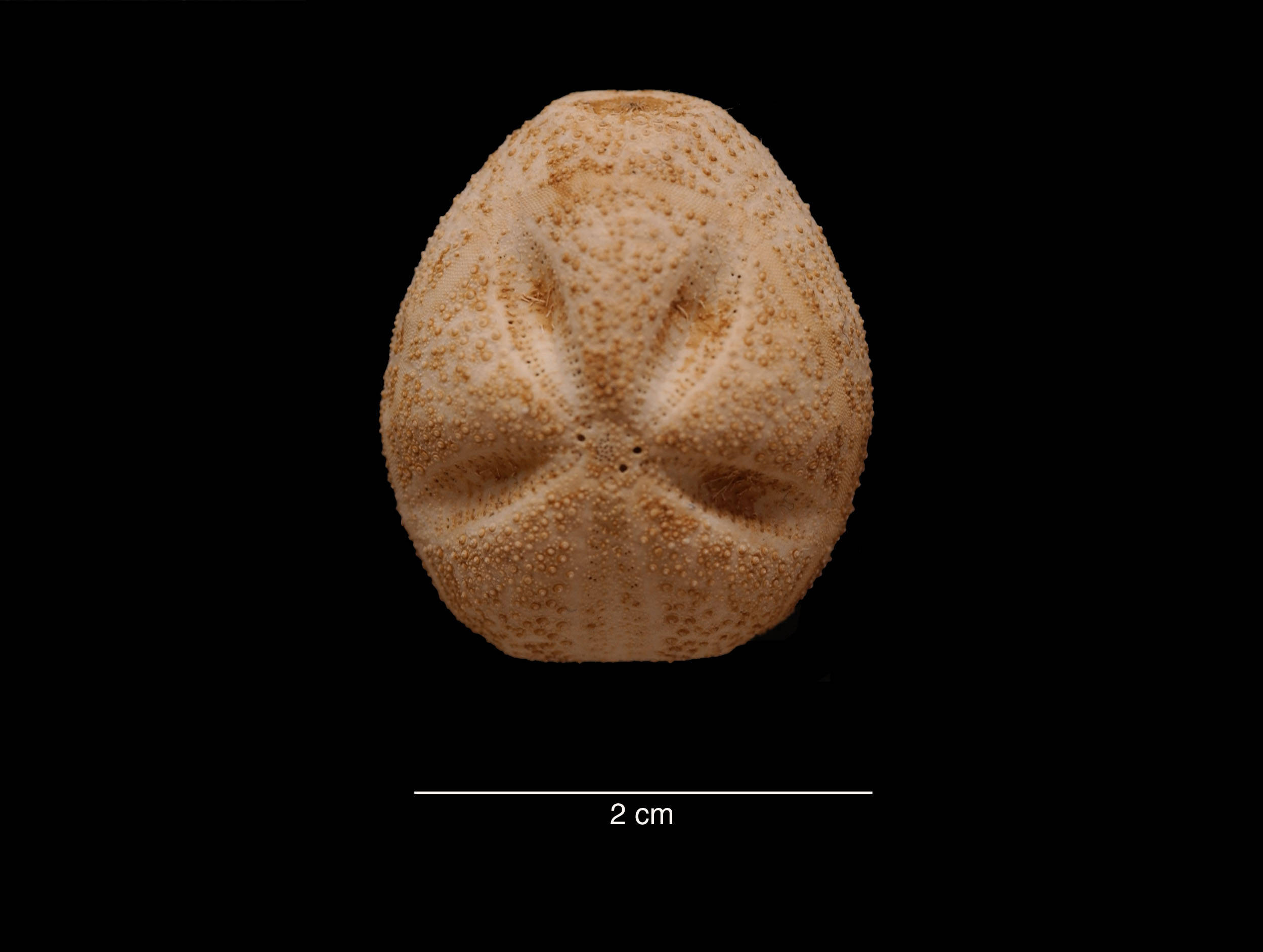

Scientific classification
- Kingdom: Animalia
- Phylum: Echinodermata
- Class: Echinoidea
- Order: Spatangoida
- Family: Schizasteridae
- Genus: Abatus
- Species: A. shackletoni

Binomial name
- Abatus shackletoni (Koehler, 1911)

= Abatus shackletoni =

Species of sea urchin

Abatus shackletoni is a species of sea urchin of the family Schizasteridae. Their armour is covered with spines. It is in the genus Abatus and lives in the sea. Abatus shackletoni was first scientifically described in 1911 by Koehler.

== Breeding ==
Abatus shackletoni are equipped with brood pouches that may hold up to 38 juveniles/embryos, these are covered by an arch of protective spikes.
