= Brisaster tasmanicus =

Scientific classification
- Kingdom: Animalia
- Phylum: Echinodermata
- Class: Echinoidea
- Order: Spatangoida
- Family: Schizasteridae
- Genus: Brisaster
- Species: B. tasmanicus

Binomial name
- Brisaster tasmanicus (McKnight, 1974)

Species of sea urchin

Brisaster tasmanicus is a species of sea urchins of the family Schizasteridae. Their armour is covered with spines. Brisaster tasmanicus was first scientifically described in 1974 by McKnight.
