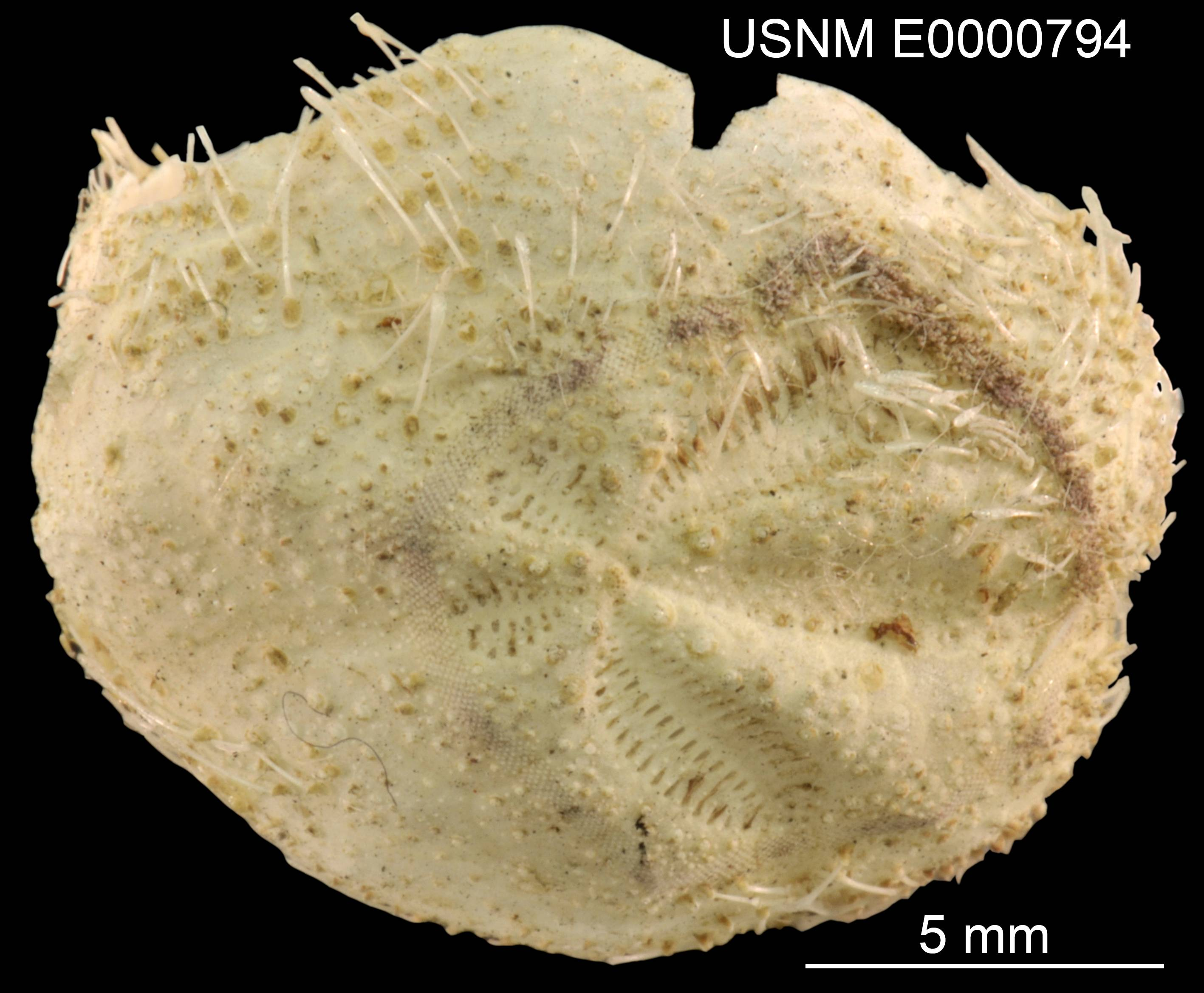

Conservation status
- Secure (NatureServe)

Scientific classification
- Kingdom: Animalia
- Phylum: Echinodermata
- Class: Echinoidea
- Order: Spatangoida
- Family: Schizasteridae
- Genus: Brisaster
- Species: B. fragilis

Binomial name
- Brisaster fragilis (Düben & Koren, 1844)

= Brisaster fragilis =

Species of sea urchin

Brisaster fragilis is a species of sea urchins of the family Schizasteridae. Their armour is covered with spines. Brisaster fragilis was first scientifically described in 1844 by Düben & Koren.
