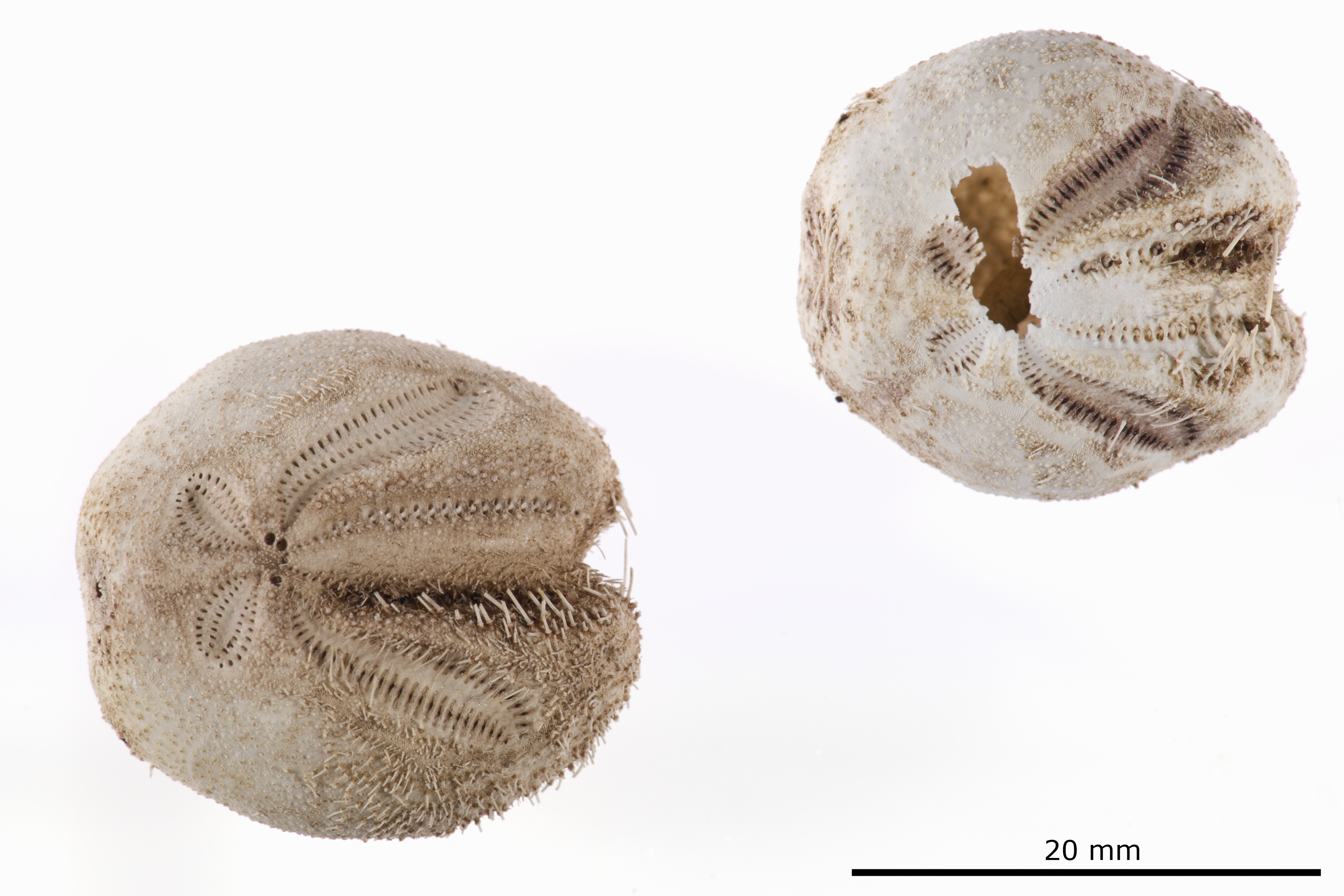
- Brisaster owstoni specimen

Scientific classification
- Kingdom: Animalia
- Phylum: Echinodermata
- Class: Echinoidea
- Order: Spatangoida
- Family: Schizasteridae
- Genus: Brisaster
- Species: B. owstoni

Binomial name
- Brisaster owstoni Mortensen, 1950

= Brisaster owstoni =

Species of sea urchin

Brisaster owstoni is a species of sea urchins of the family Schizasteridae. Their armour is covered with spines. Brisaster owstoni was first scientifically described in 1950 by Ole Theodor Jensen Mortensen.
