= Brisaster kerguelenensis =

Scientific classification
- Kingdom: Animalia
- Phylum: Echinodermata
- Class: Echinoidea
- Order: Spatangoida
- Family: Schizasteridae
- Genus: Brisaster
- Species: B. kerguelenensis

Binomial name
- Brisaster kerguelenensis Clark, 1917

Species of sea urchin

Brisaster kerguelenensis is a species of sea urchins of the family Schizasteridae. Their armour is covered with spines. Brisaster kerguelenensis was first scientifically described in 1917 by Hubert Lyman Clark.
