= Aceste bellidifera =

Scientific classification
- Kingdom: Animalia
- Phylum: Echinodermata
- Class: Echinoidea
- Order: Spatangoida
- Family: Schizasteridae
- Genus: Aceste
- Species: A. bellidifera

Binomial name
- Aceste bellidifera (Thomson, 1877)

Species of sea urchin

Aceste bellidifera is a species of sea urchin of the family Schizasteridae. Their armour is covered with spines. Aceste bellidifera was first scientifically described in 1877 by Thomson.
