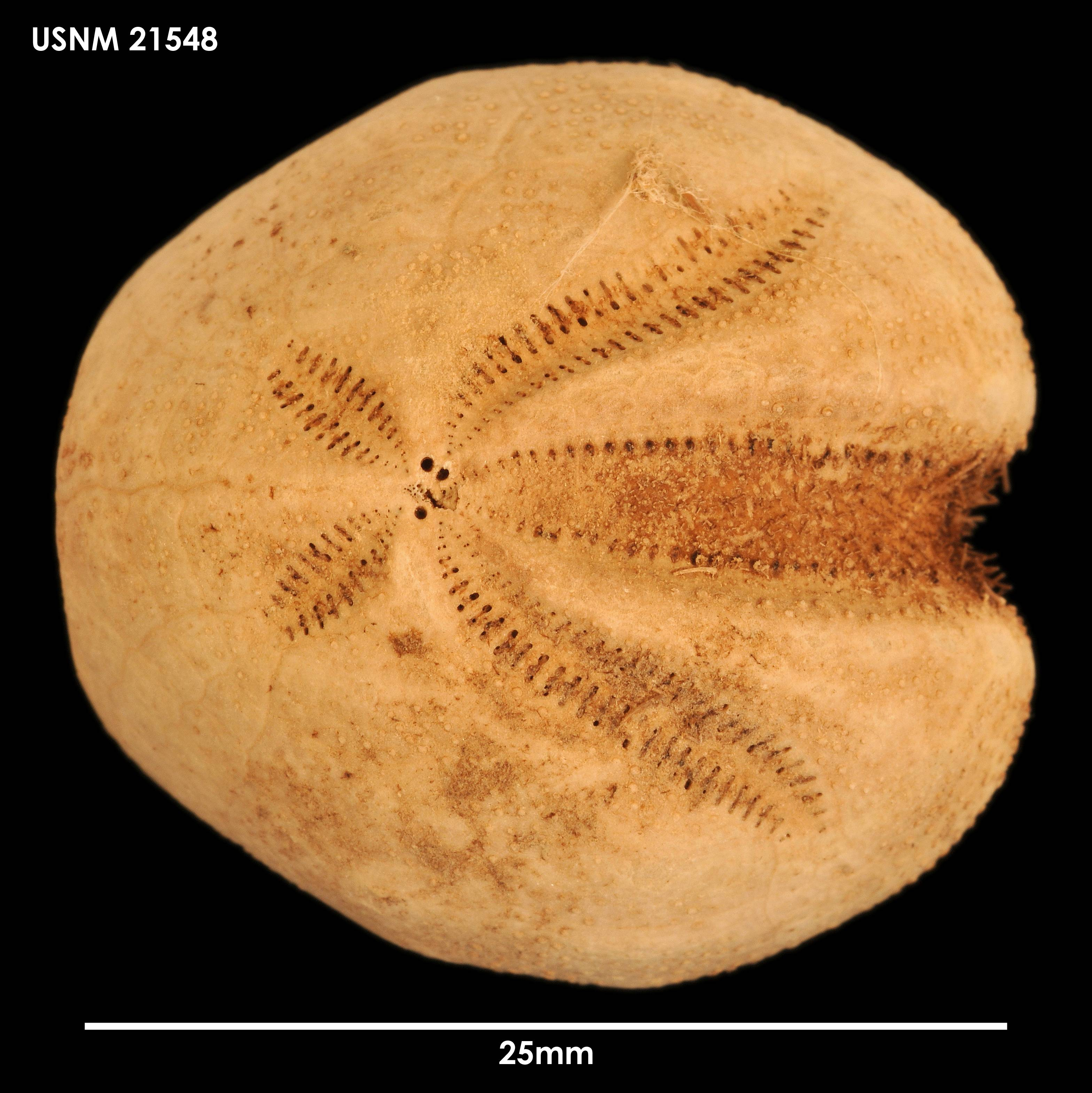

Scientific classification
- Kingdom: Animalia
- Phylum: Echinodermata
- Class: Echinoidea
- Order: Spatangoida
- Family: Schizasteridae
- Genus: Brisaster
- Species: B. moseleyi

Binomial name
- Brisaster moseleyi (Agassiz, 1881)

= Brisaster moseleyi =

Species of sea urchin

Brisaster moseleyi is a species of sea urchins of the family Schizasteridae. Their armour is covered with spines. Brisaster moseleyi was first scientifically described in 1881 by Alexander Emanuel Agassiz.
