= Brisaster capensis =

Scientific classification
- Kingdom: Animalia
- Phylum: Echinodermata
- Class: Echinoidea
- Order: Spatangoida
- Family: Schizasteridae
- Genus: Brisaster
- Species: B. capensis

Binomial name
- Brisaster capensis (Studer, 1880)

Species of sea urchin

Brisaster capensis is a species of sea urchins of the family Schizasteridae. Their armour is covered with spines. Brisaster capensis was first scientifically described in 1880 by Studer. It is endemic to South Africa.
