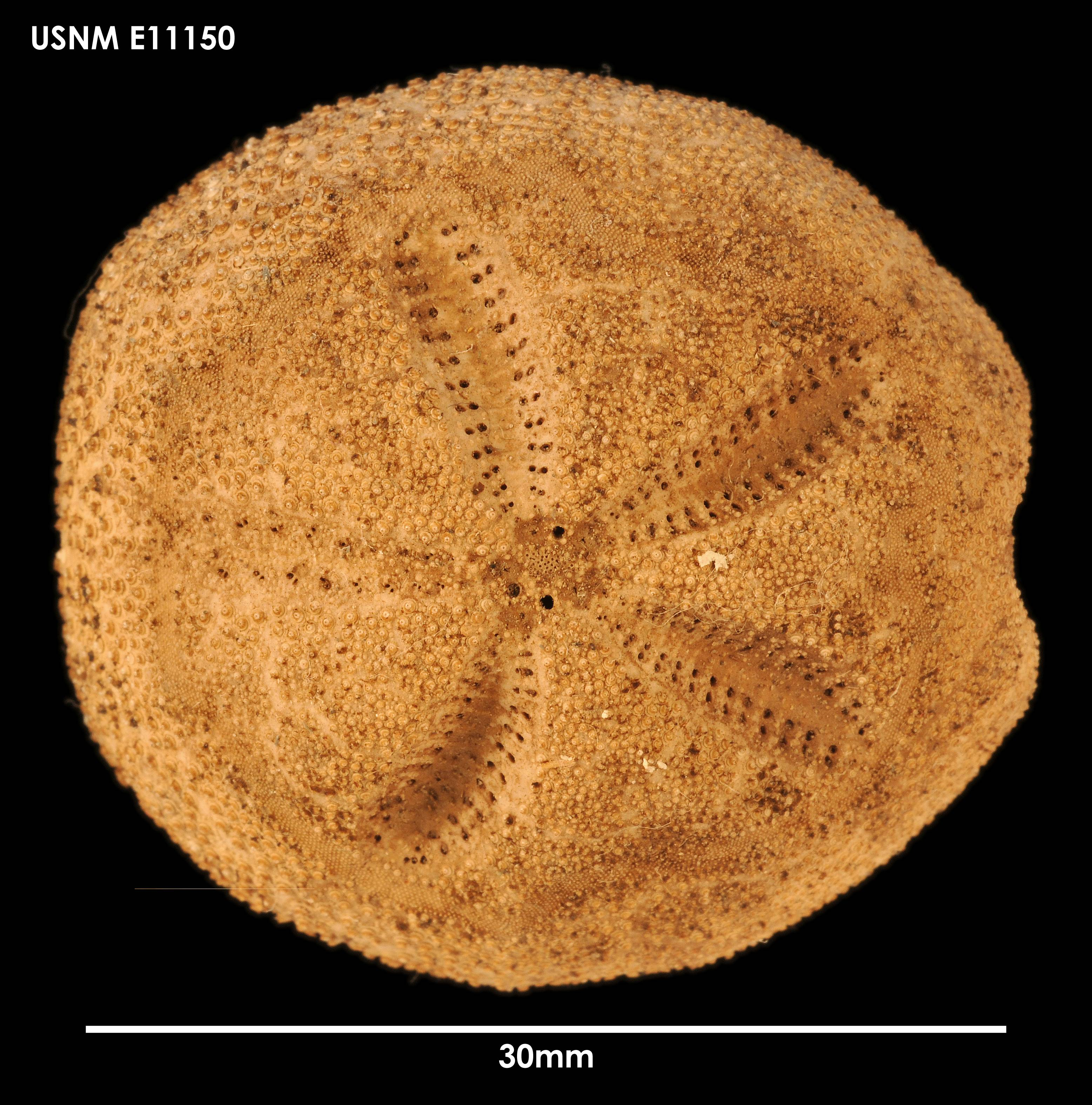

Scientific classification
- Domain: Eukaryota
- Kingdom: Animalia
- Phylum: Echinodermata
- Class: Echinoidea
- Order: Spatangoida
- Family: Schizasteridae
- Genus: Abatus
- Species: A. agassizii

Binomial name
- Abatus agassizii (Pfeffer, 1889)

= Abatus agassizii =

Species of sea urchin

Abatus agassizii is a species of sea urchin of the family Schizasteridae. Their armour is covered with spines. It is in the genus Abatus and lives in the sea. Abatus agassizii was first scientifically described in 1889 by Georg Pfeffer.

The Abatus agassizii is an irregular sea urchin species. Its habitat mostly includes South Georgia and the South Shetland Islands. Because of its habitat in the Antarctic region, the species shows strong adaptability to the shrinking and expansion of the Antarctic continental ice sheet. Moreover, the species stays located in shallow parts of less disturbed areas of the Antarctic marine environments, since the Antarctic benthos is considered one of the most disturbed in the world.

== Digestive System ==
The Abatus agassizii has a twice-looped digestive system that's three times as long as the given species individual itself. The species is a deposit-feeder, which means it relies on the consumption of the sediment it stays burrowed in. It is also characterized by incredibly slow digestion. The system is made up of several regions: the buccal cavity, anterior esophagus, posterior esophagus, anterior stomach, posterior stomach, intestine, and rectum. Because of the low-complexity of the agassizii's diet, it is proposed that this long digestive tract holds a diverse gut microbiota.
