= Aceste weberi =

Scientific classification
- Kingdom: Animalia
- Phylum: Echinodermata
- Class: Echinoidea
- Order: Spatangoida
- Family: Schizasteridae
- Genus: Aceste
- Species: A. weberi

Binomial name
- Aceste weberi (Koehler, 1914)

Species of sea urchin

Aceste weberi is a species of sea urchin of the family Schizasteridae. Their armour is covered with spines. It came from the genus Aceste and lives in the sea. Aceste weberi was first scientifically described in 1914 by Koehler.
