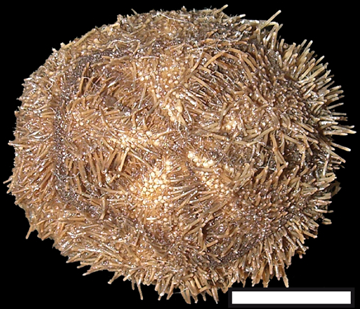

Scientific classification
- Kingdom: Animalia
- Phylum: Echinodermata
- Class: Echinoidea
- Order: Spatangoida
- Family: Schizasteridae
- Genus: Abatus
- Species: A. cavernosus

Binomial name
- Abatus cavernosus (Philippi, 1845)

= Abatus cavernosus =

Species of sea urchin

Abatus cavernosus is a species of sea urchin of the family Schizasteridae. Their armour is covered with spines. It is in the genus Abatus and lives in the sea. Abatus cavernosus was first scientifically described in 1845 by Rodolfo Philippi. Females brood their young in a brood pouch through the gastrula stage until they are juveniles. Sexual dimorphism in Abatus cavernosus is characterized by external brood pouches and the enlargement of gonopores in brooding females.
