= Brisaster townsendi =

Scientific classification
- Kingdom: Animalia
- Phylum: Echinodermata
- Class: Echinoidea
- Order: Spatangoida
- Family: Schizasteridae
- Genus: Brisaster
- Species: B. townsendi

Binomial name
- Brisaster townsendi (Agassiz, 1898)

Species of sea urchin

Brisaster townsendi is a species of sea urchins of the family Schizasteridae. Their armour is covered with spines. Brisaster townsendi was first scientifically described in 1898 by Alexander Emanuel Agassiz.
