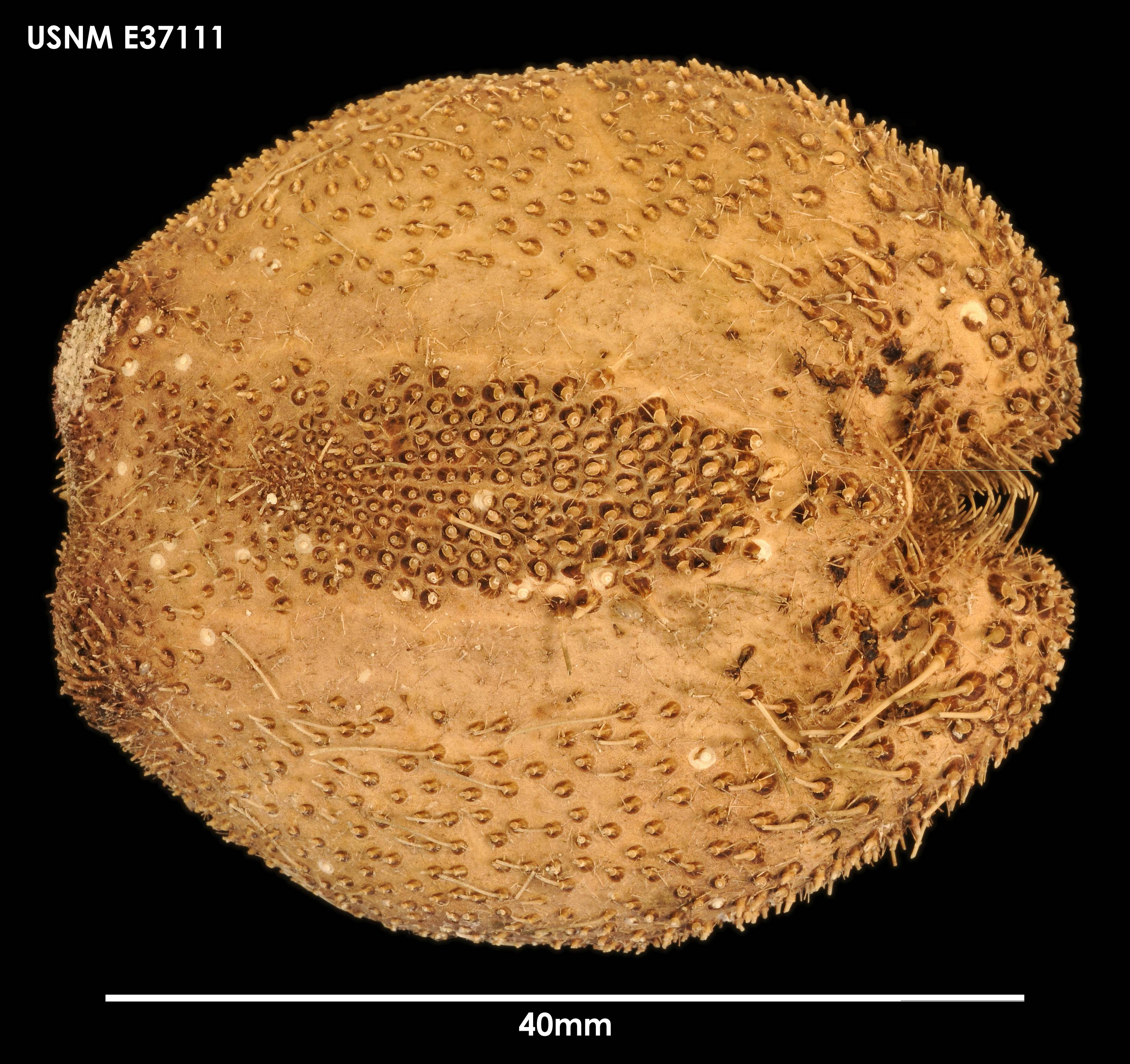

Scientific classification
- Kingdom: Animalia
- Phylum: Echinodermata
- Class: Echinoidea
- Order: Spatangoida
- Family: Schizasteridae
- Genus: Brisaster
- Species: B. antarcticus

Binomial name
- Brisaster antarcticus (Döderlein, 1906)

= Brisaster antarcticus =

Species of sea urchin

Brisaster antarcticus is a species of sea urchins of the family Schizasteridae. Their armour is covered with spines. Brisaster antarcticus was first scientifically described in 1906 by Döderlein.
