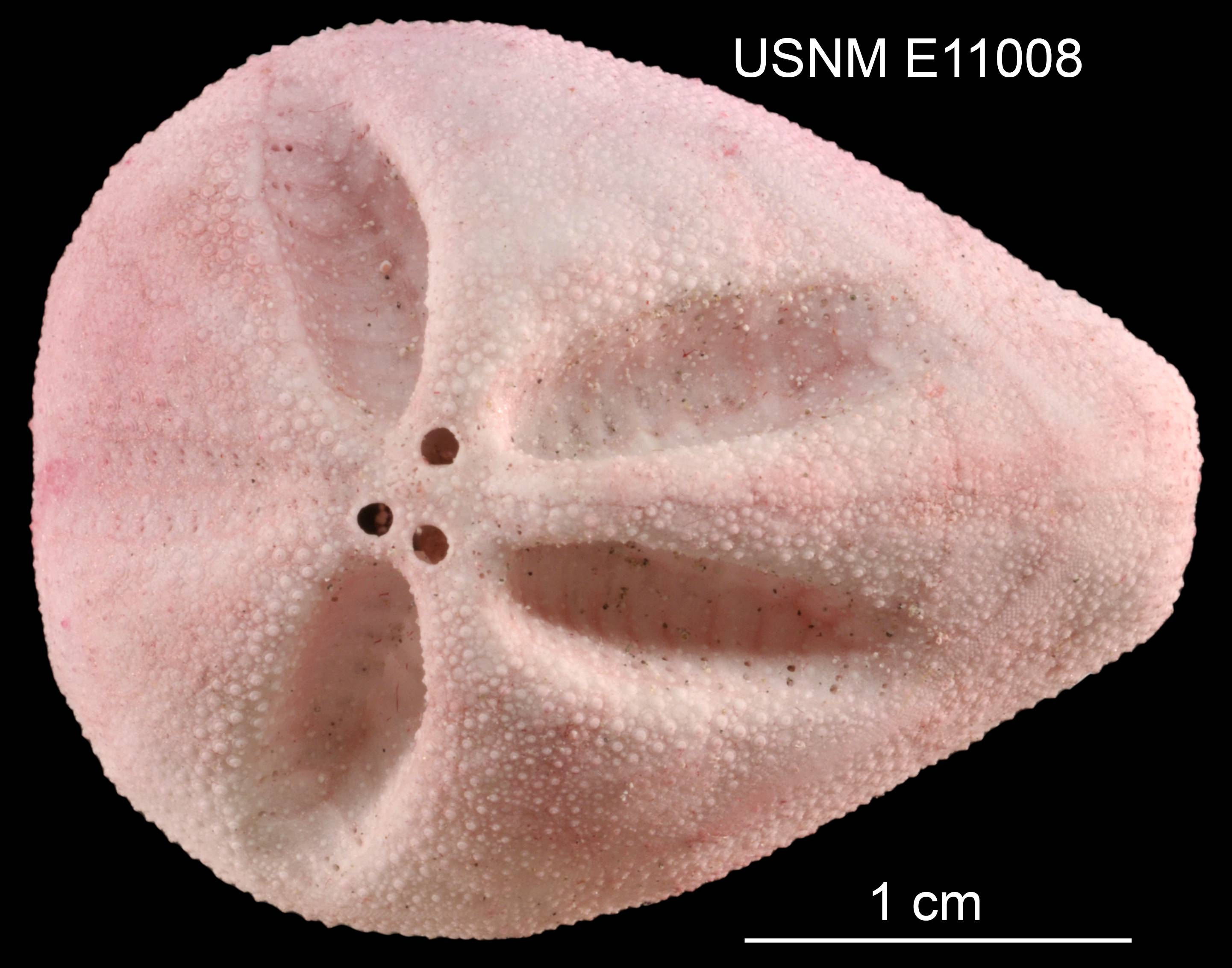

Scientific classification
- Domain: Eukaryota
- Kingdom: Animalia
- Phylum: Echinodermata
- Class: Echinoidea
- Order: Spatangoida
- Family: Schizasteridae
- Genus: Abatus
- Species: A. beatriceae

Binomial name
- Abatus beatriceae (Larrain, 1986)

= Abatus beatriceae =

Species of sea urchin

Abatus beatriceae is a species of sea urchin of the family Schizasteridae. Their armour is covered with spines. It is in the genus Abatus and lives in the sea. Abatus beatriceae was first scientifically described in 1986 by Alberto Larrain.
