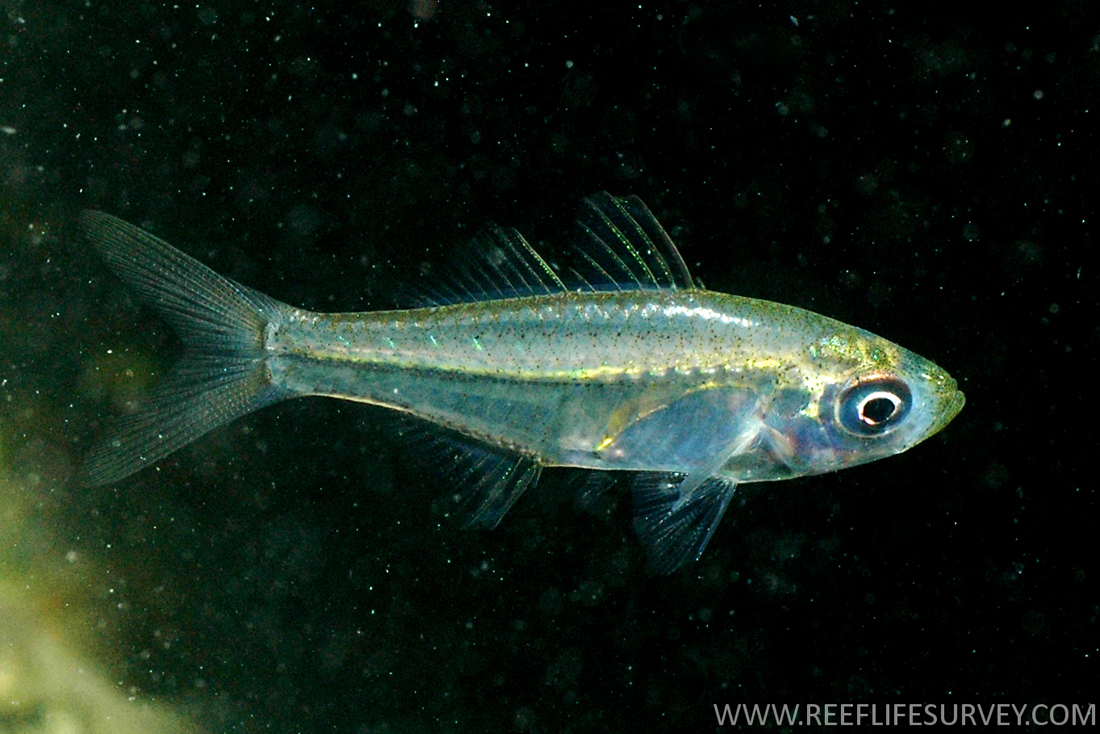

Scientific classification
- Kingdom: Animalia
- Phylum: Chordata
- Class: Actinopterygii
- Division: Teleostei
- Order: Mugiliformes
- Family: Ambassidae
- Genus: Pseudoambassis
- Species: P. jacksoniensis

Binomial name
- Pseudoambassis jacksoniensis Macleay, 1881

Synonyms
- Ambassis jacksoniensis (Macleay, 1881); Velambassis jacksoniensis (Macleay, 1881)

= Pseudoambassis jacksoniensis =

Species of fish

Pseudoambassis jacksoniensis, commonly known as the Port Jackson glassfish or Port Jackson perchlet, is a species of fish in the family Ambassidae native to eastern Australia. It gains its common name from its transparent appearance.

== Taxonomy ==
William John Macleay described the Port Jackson glassfish as Pseudoambassis jacksoniensis in 1881 from a specimen collected in Port Jackson, noting that the length was three and a third times the fishes' height. The species name relates to the location it was described. It was classified in the new genus Velambassis by Gilbert Whitley in 1935, on the basis of having weaker dorsal spines than other members of the family. Allen and Burgess found no reason for the species not to be in the genus Ambassis and reassigned it there in 1990. These moves were reverted with the revalidation of Pseudoambassis in 2023.

This species and the co-occurring estuary glassfish (A. marianus) are the only two members of the family found in temperate waters. The others are found in the waters of tropical northern Australia and southeast Asia.

== Description ==
Reaching a standard length of 7 cm (2 3/4 in), the Port Jackson glassfish has a silver and semi-transparent body and head covered with large cycloid scales. It has a short deeply-notched dorsal fin and forked tail fin. It is slimmer than the related A. marianus—its body depth is 33 to 38% of standard length compared to the latter species' body depth of 37 to 44% of standard length. The Port Jackson glassfish also has a lateral line running the length of its body, while that of its relative is partial.

== Distribution and habitat ==
The Port Jackson glassfish is native to coastal eastern Australia, from Moreton Bay in Queensland through to Narooma in southern New South Wales. It lives in estuaries and protected brackish tidal streams that have mangroves growing along the margins.

== Feeding ==
The Port Jackson glassfish feeds on zooplankton, foraging from the water surface to the substrate. It is a food item of the little pied and little black cormorants.
