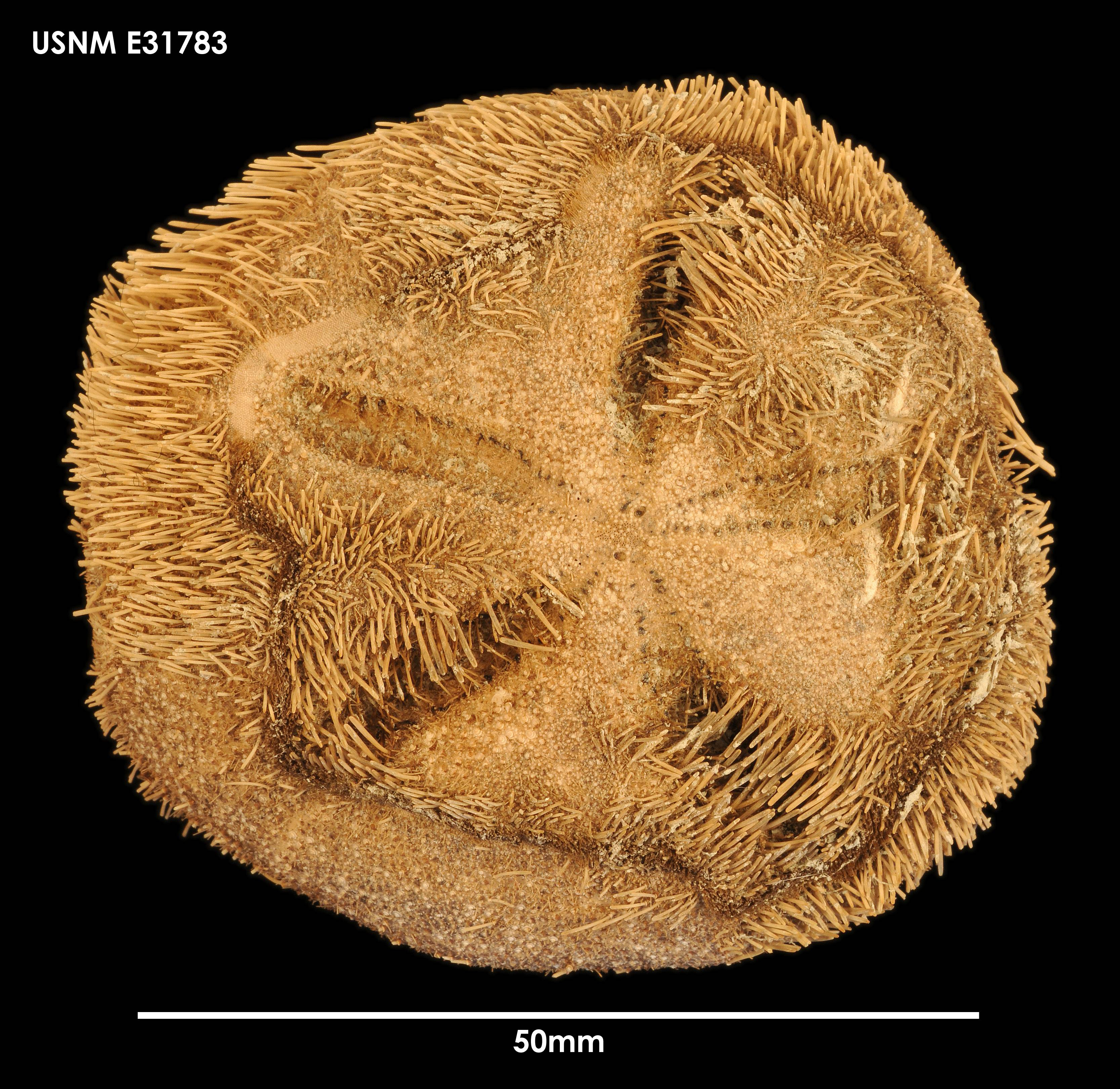

Scientific classification
- Domain: Eukaryota
- Kingdom: Animalia
- Phylum: Echinodermata
- Class: Echinoidea
- Order: Spatangoida
- Family: Schizasteridae
- Genus: Abatus
- Species: A. curvidens

Binomial name
- Abatus curvidens (Mortensen, 1936)

= Abatus curvidens =

Species of sea urchin

Abatus curvidens is a species of sea urchin of the family Schizasteridae. Their armour is covered with spines. It is in the genus Abatus and lives in the sea. Abatus curvidens was first scientifically described in 1836 by Ole Mortensen.
