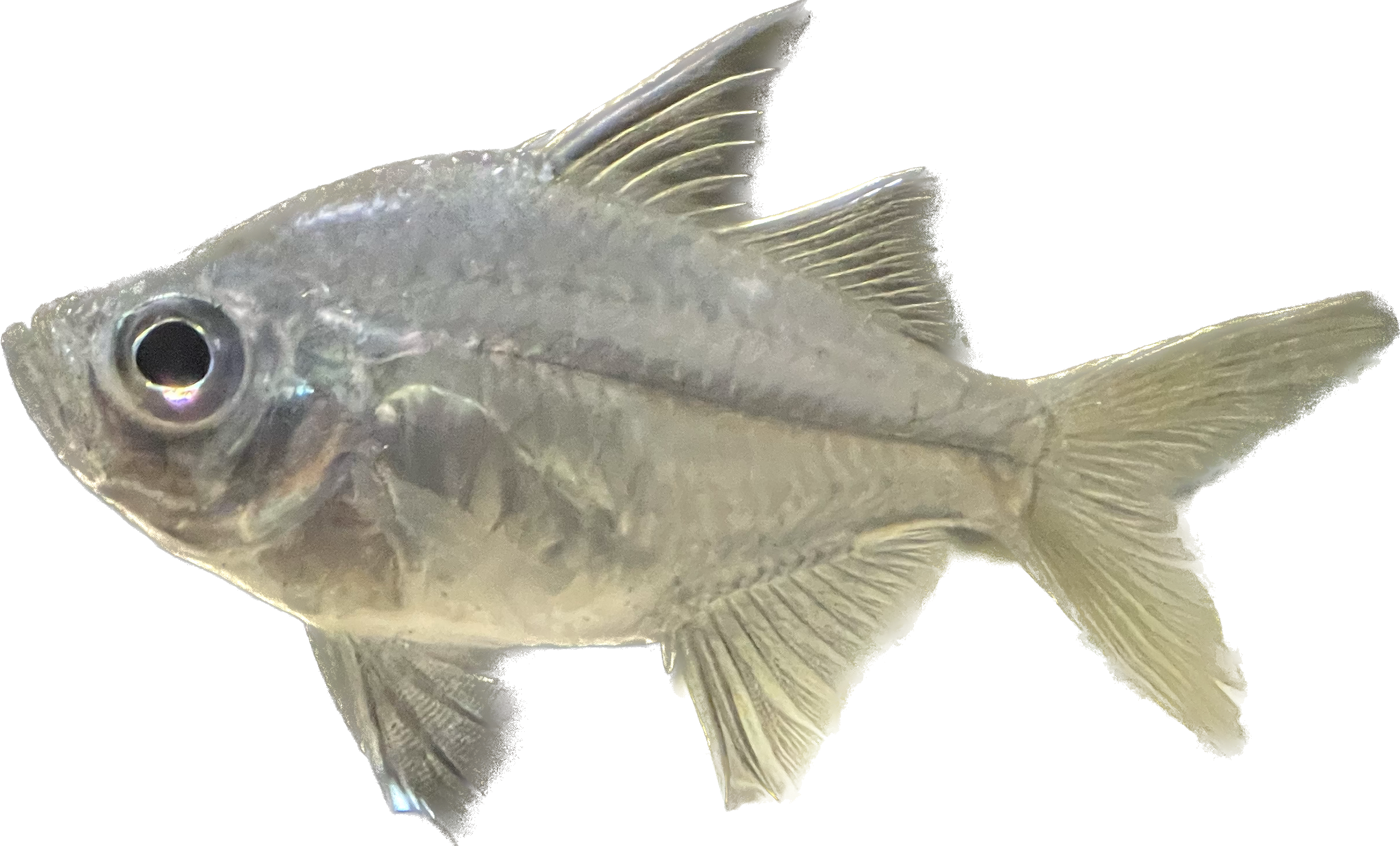

Conservation status
- Least Concern (IUCN 3.1)

Scientific classification
- Kingdom: Animalia
- Phylum: Chordata
- Class: Actinopterygii
- Order: Mugiliformes
- Family: Ambassidae
- Genus: Pseudoambassis
- Species: P. agassizii

Binomial name
- Pseudoambassis agassizii (Steindachner, 1866)

Synonyms
- Ambassis agassizii Steindachner, 1866; Ambassis muelleri Klunzinger, 1880; Pseudoambassis castelnaui Macleay, 1881; Pseudambassis nigripinnis De Vis, 1884; Pseudambassis pallidus De Vis, 1884; Pseudoambassis pallidus (De Vis, 1884); Priopis olivaceus Ogilby, 1910; Priopis nigripinnis Ogilby, 1910

= Agassiz's perchlet =

Species of fish

Agassiz's perchlet (Pseudoambassis agassizii), also known as Agassiz's glass fish and the olive perchlet, is a species of ray-finned fish in the family Ambassidae. It is semi-transparent with dark scale edges forming a pattern over most of the body. It grows to a maximum of 7.5 cm (3.0 in). It is a macrophyte spawner with adhesive eggs. It is endemic to Australia. It was named for the zoologist Louis Agassiz.

== Etymology ==
The specific name was not explained by Steindachner when he described this species but it almost certainly honours the Swiss-American biologist and geologist Louis Agassiz (1807-1873).

== Description ==
Agassiz's perchlet has a laterally compressed, oval shaped body with a moderately large, oblique mouth, very large eyes and a forked tail. They are normally semi-transparent but may be olive in colour have dark-edges to their scales which creat a distinct, network pattern with a thin black line along the middle of the flanks which becomes more obvious towards the tail.. The fins are mostly translucent but there is frequently a wide, dusky band along the margins of the pelvic and anal fins. They can grow to about 70–80 millimetres (2.8–3.1 in) but 40 millimetres (1.6 in) is a more common length. The teeth are conical and are found on the jaws, the vomer and palatines while the head has some small spines. It has a lateral line which is incomplete and often divided into two sections. The dorsal fin is deeply notched and has its origin in front of the pelvic fins. The first spine of the dorsal spine is small and projects forwards.

== Distribution ==
Agassiz's perchlet is endemic to Australia where it is now only found in Queensland, New South Wales and Victoria. They were once widespread in the Murray-Darling basin in South Australia, Victoria, western New South Wales, and southern Queensland, but the population has declined and the range has contracted. It is now known to occur at a limited number of sites in the Darling River drainage and an isolated population in the central Lachlan catchment. It also occurs in coastal streams in New South Wales and Queensland In 2008 a large population was found in a tributary of the Lachlan River near the Brewster Weir in New South Wales.

In 2022 the species was rediscovered in Victoria after not being recorded in the state for 93 years, in Mullaroo Creek within Murray-Sunset National Park, and as of August 2025, work was underway to reintroduce the species to the state's waterways.

The species previously occurred in South Australia, but was extirpated from that state by around 1983 owing to loss of habitat and drought.

== Habitat and biology ==
Agassiz's perchlet occurs rivers, creeks, ponds, and swamps, with a preference for slow-flowing or still waters, where they normally inhabit more sheltered areas where there is overhanging vegetation, beds of aquatic macrophytes, logs, dead branches, and boulders where they can hide during the day. They are nocturnal and they leave their hiding places to feed at night, although they often feed during the day.

They attain sexual maturity after a year and their lifespan is 2–4 years. Spawning takes place from October to December, triggered by the increase in water temperature to around 23 °C (73 °F). The females lay 200-700 small adhesive spherical eggs, which are 0.7 millimetres (0.028 in) in diameter, these become attached to aquatic plants and rocks on the bed of streams They feed on a variety of zooplankton and both aquatic and terrestrial insects. The larvae hatch from the eggs after 5–7 days and are 3mm in total length, they start to swim and feed 4–5 days, sometimes up to 9 days, after hatching. The larvae school close to the top of the water column for approximately one month.

Little is known about this species' migratory patterns, but in coastal streams they have been recorded moving through fish passes in tidal barrages.

== Conservation status and measures ==
Agassiz's perchlet is threatened by predation by non-native fish species which have been introduced into its range such as Gambusia holbrooki and the European perch (Perca fluviatilis). There has been degradation of its habitat by the removal of vegetation, logs and snags, rapid fluctuations in water levels caused by river regulation have negatively affected their breeding. An example of this is the failure of the fish to spawn caused by cold water releases from dams. The vegetation they shelter in has been lost due to water regulation and through grazing by the introduced common carp (Cyprinus carpio).

They are present in the aquarium trade.

In 2025, the fish were reintroduced to wetlands within Glenelg Golf Course in the Adelaide suburb of Novar Gardens. The South Australian Government-supported group Green Adelaide provided $50,000 to the not-for-profit Nature Glenelg Trust. It is hoped that the population would grow from 500 to 10,000 by 2026, and that the fish may be introduced back into the wild in the state one day.
