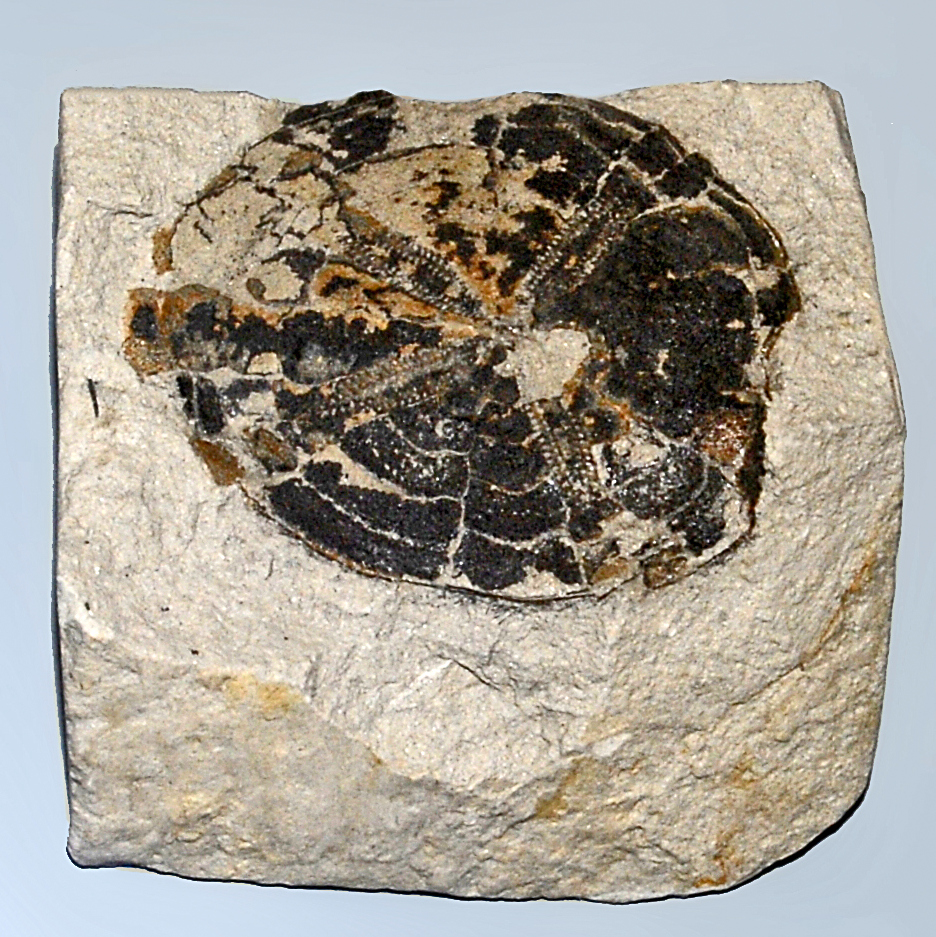
- Fossil of Schizaster species from Italy

Scientific classification
- Kingdom: Animalia
- Phylum: Echinodermata
- Class: Echinoidea
- Order: Spatangoida
- Family: Schizasteridae
- Genus: Schizaster; L. Agassiz, 1835

Synonyms
- Aplospatangus Lambert 1907; Brachybrissus Pomel 1883

= Schizaster =

Schizaster Temporal range: Paleocene - Recent

Genus of sea urchins

Schizaster is a genus of heart urchins belonging to the family Schizasteridae. The type species of the genus is Schizaster studeri.

== Species ==
Extant and extinct species within this genus include:

- Schizaster alcaldei Sánchez Roig, 1949 †
- Schizaster alsiensis Maccagno, 1947 †
- Schizaster altissimus Arnold & H. L. Clark, 1927 †
- Schizaster bathypetalus Arnold & H. L. Clark, 1927 †
- Schizaster beckeri Cooke, 1942 †
- Schizaster brachypetalus Arnold & H. L. Clark, 1927 †
- Schizaster caobaense Sánchez Roig, 1949 †
- Schizaster cojimarensis Sánchez Roig, 1949 †
- Schizaster compactus (Koehler, 1914)
- Schizaster costaricensis Durham, 1961 †
- Schizaster delorenzoi Checchia-Rispoli, 1950 †
- Schizaster doederleini (Chesher, 1972)
- Schizaster dumblei Israelsky, 1924 †
- Schizaster duroensis Kier, 1957 †
- Schizaster dyscritus Arnold & H. L. Clark, 1927 †
- Schizaster edwardsi Cotteau, 1889 -
- Schizaster eopneustes Lambert, 1933 †
- Schizaster excavatus Martin, in Jeannet & Martin, 1937 †
- Schizaster fernandezi Sánchez Roig, 1952 †
- Schizaster floridiensis (Kier & Grant, 1965)
- Schizaster gerthi Pijpers, 1933 †
- Schizaster gibberulus L. Agassiz in L. Agassiz & Desor, 1847
- Schizaster gigas Sánchez Roig, 1953 †
- Schizaster granti Duncan & Sladen, 1883 †
- Schizaster guirensis Sánchez Roig, 1949 †
- Schizaster habanensis Sánchez Roig, 1949 †
- Schizaster hexagonalis Arnold & H. L. Clark, 1927 †
- Schizaster humei Lambert, 1932 †
- Schizaster hunti Kier, 1957 †
- Schizaster jeanneti Martin, in Jeannet & Martin, 1937 †
- Schizaster karkarensis Kier, 1957 †
- Schizaster kinasaensis Morishita, 1953 †
- Schizaster lacunosus (Linnaeus, 1758)
- Schizaster leprosorum Lambert, 1933 †
- Schizaster llagunoi Lambert & Sánchez Roig, in Sánchez Roig, 1949 †
- Schizaster marci Castex, 1930 †
- Schizaster miyazakiensis Morishita, 1956 †
- Schizaster morlini Grant & Hertlein, 1956 †
- Schizaster moronensis Sánchez Roig, 1951 †
- Schizaster munozi Sánchez Roig, 1949 †
- Schizaster narindensis Lambert, 1933 †
- Schizaster ocalanus Cooke, 1942 †
- Schizaster orbignyanus A. Agassiz, 1880
- Schizaster ovatus (Lindley, 2004)
- Schizaster pappi Thirring, 1936 †
- Schizaster pentagonalis Sánchez Roig, 1953 †
- Schizaster persica Clegg, 1933 †
- Schizaster portisi Serra, 1932 †
- Schizaster pratti Israelsky, 1933 †
- Schizaster riveroi Sánchez Roig, 1952 †
- Schizaster rojasi Sánchez Roig, 1952 †
- Schizaster rotundatus (Döderlein, 1906)
- Schizaster salutis Sánchez Roig, 1949 †
- Schizaster sanctamariae Sánchez Roig, 1949 †
- Schizaster santanae Sánchez Roig, 1949 †
- Schizaster schlosseri Traub, 1938 †
- Schizaster taiwanicus Hayasaka, 1948 †
- Schizaster vedadoensis Sánchez Roig, 1949 †

The fossil record of the genus dates back to the Paleocene (age range: 66.043 to 0.012 million years ago). These fossils have been found all over the world.
