= Ambassis marianus =

Conservation status
- Least Concern (IUCN 3.1)

Scientific classification
- Kingdom: Animalia
- Phylum: Chordata
- Class: Actinopterygii
- Order: Mugiliformes
- Family: Ambassidae
- Genus: Ambassis
- Species: A. marianus

Binomial name
- Ambassis marianus Günther, 1880

Synonyms
- Pseudambassis convexus De Vis, 1884; Pseudoambassis ramsayi Macleay, 1881

Species of fish

Ambassis marianus, commonly known as the estuary perchlet, Ramsay's glassfish, estuary glassfish or glass perchlet, is a species of fish in the family Ambassidae. It is native to coastal eastern Australia. It gains its common name from its transparent appearance.

== Taxonomy ==
German-British naturalist Albert Günther described Ambassis marianus in 1880 from a specimen collected from the Mary River near the village of Tiaro, some twenty miles upstream from Maryborough, on an expedition in May 1874. William John Macleay described a specimen from Port Jackson (Sydney) as Pseudoambassis ramsayi. Charles Walter De Vis described Pseudoambassis convexus from a Queensland specimen in 1884. Both of these are now regarded as synonyms of Ambassis marianus.

This species and the co-occurring Port Jackson glassfish (A. jacksoniensis) are the only two members of the genus found in temperate waters. The others are found in the waters of northern Australia and southeast Asia.

== Distribution and habitat ==
It is native to coastal eastern Australia, from Maryborough in central Queensland through to Narooma in southern New South Wales. It lives in estuaries and protected brackish tidal streams that have mangroves growing along the margins.

== Ecology ==
A controlled study comparing six native fish species with the introduced (and invasive) eastern mosquitofish (Gambusia holbrooki) on consuming larvae of the common banded mosquito (Culex annulirostris) in Brisbane found that the estuary glassfish was as efficient at eating mosquito larvae as the eastern mosquitofish and is a good candidate for mosquito control.
