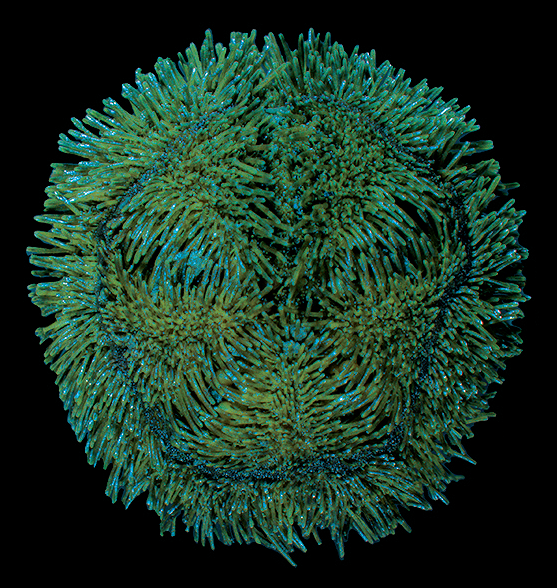
- Abatus cavernosus

Scientific classification
- Kingdom: Animalia
- Phylum: Echinodermata
- Class: Echinoidea
- Order: Spatangoida
- Family: Schizasteridae
- Genus: Abatus; Troschel, 1851

Species
- See text.

Synonyms
- Spatagodesma (Agassiz, 1898); Spatangodesma(misspelling); Tripylus (Abatus) (Troschel, 1851)

= Abatus =

Genus of sea urchins

Abatus is a genus of sea urchins belonging to the family Schizasteridae.

The species of this genus are found in Antarctica and southernmost America.

Species:

- Abatus agassizii Pfeffer, 1889
- Abatus beatriceae (Larrain, 1986)
- Abatus cavernosus (Philippi, 1845)
- Abatus cordatus (Verrill, 1876)
- Abatus curvidens Mortensen, 1936
- Abatus ingens Koehler, 1926
- Abatus kieri McKinney, McNamara & Wiedman, 1988
- Abatus koehleri (Thiéry, 1909)
- Abatus nimrodi (Koehler, 1911)
- Abatus philippii Lovén, 1871
- Abatus shackletoni Koehler, 1911
