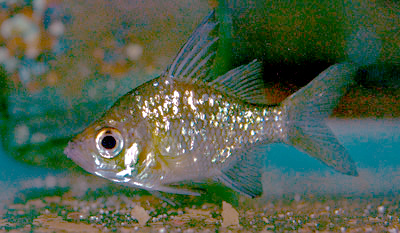

Conservation status
- Least Concern (IUCN 3.1)

Scientific classification
- Kingdom: Animalia
- Phylum: Chordata
- Class: Actinopterygii
- Division: Teleostei
- Order: Mugiliformes
- Family: Ambassidae
- Genus: Pseudoambassis
- Species: P. macleayi

Binomial name
- Pseudoambassis macleayi Castelnau, 1878
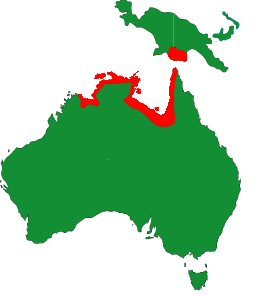
- Approximate distribution of P. macleayi within Australia and New Guinea

Synonyms
- Ambassis macleayi (Castelnau, 1878); Austrochanda macleayi (Castelnau, 1878); Chanda macleayi (Castelnau, 1878), Pseudambassis macleayi (Castelnau, 1878)

= Pseudoambassis macleayi =

Species of fish

Pseudoambassis macleayi, commonly known as Macleay's glassfish, Macleay's glass perchlet, Macleay's perchlet, reticulated glassfish, reticulated perchlet, or network perchlet, is a species of freshwater fish in the family Ambassidae. It is native to northern Australia and the trans-Fly River region of New Guinea. It is a fish with a vertically flat, narrow body and a standard length generally between 35 and 45 mm (1.4 and 1.8 in), with large specimens reaching 77 mm (3.0 in) long. It generally eats water fleas and other small invertebrates. This fish is considered to be a least-concern species according to the International Union for Conservation of Nature (IUCN), although it could suffer from habitat degradation due to feral pigs and invasive water plants such as the water hyacinth. The fish is suitable for aquarium use in tanks containing other non-aggressive species.

== Taxonomy ==
French naturalist Francis de Castelnau described this species as Pseudoambassis macleayi in 1878, from specimens collected from the Norman River near the Gulf of Carpentaria in northern Australia. The species was named in honour of William Macleay for his important contributions to fish taxonomy. Castelnau placed it in a new genus, separate to Ambassis, due to its lack of a recumbent spine (spine laying against the dorsal surface) in front of its dorsal fin. Allan Riverstone McCulloch placed it in the genus Ambassis in 1929. Gilbert Percy Whitley made it the type species of the genus Austrochanda, calling it Austrochanda macleayi, in 1935. The species was subsequently returned to Ambassis in 1989 by J. R. Paxton, D. F. Hoese, G. R. Allen, and J. E. Hanley in the Zoological Catalogue of Australia. Common names include Macleay's glassfish, Macleay's glass perchlet, Macleay's perchlet and reticulated glassfish. These moves were reverted with the revalidation of Pseudoambassis in 2023.

== Description ==
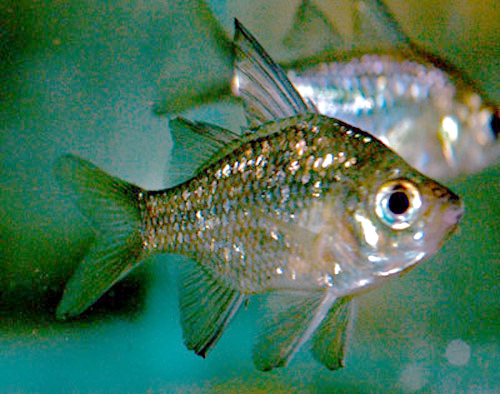

Macleay's glassfish is a moderately large ambassid that may grow to a standard length (SL) of 77 mm (3.0 in), but is usually between 35 and 45 mm (1.4 and 1.8 in). Males tend to be larger than females. The body is deep, at close to half the SL, with a large head and a maxilla (upper jaw) that extends beyond the front edge of the large eye. The first dorsal fin is tall at up to 40% SL, with the second spine longer than the first; within the anal fin, the third spine is longer than the second. Colour varies from a partly transparent olive-green to a dark brown/green or a golden/yellow, with the lower surfaces generally paler. Scales have a darker edge giving a reticulated pattern, especially on the upper half. The caudal (tail), anal and dorsal fins are dusky with off-white to translucent spines and white to yellow rays; the caudal and anal fins may have a thin reddish or dark margin; pelvic fins are white and the pectoral fins are transparent often with a dark mark at the base of the fin. P. macleayi may be differentiated from other fish of the genus Ambassis by the relatively deep body, high gill raker count, interrupted lateral line and the dark spot at the base of the pectoral fins.

== Distribution and habitat ==
Ambassis macleayi occurs from the Carson River in the Kimberley region of Western Australia across the north of Australia to the Jardine River in Cape York, although the distribution in north-east Queensland is patchy. In New Guinea, the fish is found in the trans-Fly region, a lowland area of savanna and grasslands in the south of the island.

Preferred habitat consists of streams and swamps, tending towards muddy lagoons at the end of the dry season to much further afield by the end of the wet season including lowland lagoons and the main channel of rivers and streams in the escarpments surrounding the Gulf of Carpentaria. It is typically found in heavily vegetated habitats with macrophytes, woody debris and leaf-litter and rarely at a depth of more than 1 m (3 ft). The fish is found in less vegetated water than other species of this genus and shows a preference for submerged rather than emergent vegetation. It has been found over all substrates, most commonly sand and mud then clay, gravel, leaves, rocks and boulders.

Despite high levels of connectivity during the wet season, very little dispersion of P. macleayi occurs between adjacent catchments. This has been backed up by studies showing a high degree of genetic diversity between catchments. As a result, this species is unable to rapidly recolonise areas after a disturbance and it has been recommended that any conservation of the species should be on a catchment-by-catchment basis rather than across its entire range.

== Breeding and lifecycle ==
P. macleayi is a moderately fecund fish with large females producing up to around 2,300 small (0.3 mm) eggs which expand on contact with water. P. macleayi is an obligate plant spawner, with the eggs adhering to aquatic vegetation as they descend through the water column. The fish spawn in batches of several hundred eggs over a period of a week. The eggs hatch in 21–23 hours at 25–28 °C (77–82 °F). The newly hatched larvae are poorly developed but mature quickly, are around 1.5–1.6 millimetres (0.059–0.063 in) on hatching and 2.25–2.5 millimetres (0.089–0.098 in) at first feeding after only three days, and having absorbed the yolk sac after just two days. The young fry attain a length of around 10 millimetres (0.39 in) upon completion of metamorphosis at 18 days. Reports vary as to the age at maturity, with some claiming 3 months and others 12 months. Spawning occurs all year round with a slight increase at the beginning of the wet season.

== Ecology ==
P. macleayi are classified as micro-crustacivores (eaters of micro crustaceans). The diet generally contains about 70% tiny cladoceran crustaceans known as water fleas, with about 20% of the diet being aquatic insects, especially chironomid larvae. This ratio is reportedly quite different in the Normanby River, where cladocerans make up only 10% of the diet compared to around 70% chironomids. The species demonstrates a flexible foraging strategy with stomach contents including aerial and terrestrial invertebrates, small fish, other microinvertebrates, terrestrial plant matter and algae as well up to 15% unidentifiable material. Studies have shown that like other species of a similar size, P. macleayi will only patrol areas of open water with low predator count of such species as barramundi and Neoarius midgleyi. It is otherwise confined to areas of heavy cover and is often found in turbid water.

== Relationship with humans ==
The species may be kept as an aquarium fish with a temperature range of 22–34 °C (72–93 °F), pH from 6.0 to 9.7, and hardness around 100 ppm. In Queensland there is a possession limit of 20 individuals for this species. P. macleayi is non-aggressive and suitable for larger community tanks and coexists well with other fish that are not small enough to be considered prey. A naturally schooling fish, it is reportedly best kept in a group of six or more. Occasional live feed, such as brine shrimp or daphnia, is recommended by the Australia New Guinea Fishes Association.

The Queensland Government recommends Macleay's glassfish for mosquito control in dams within the Gulf of Carpentaria drainage division. In 1991 a study noted that P. macleayi was one of three species of freshwater fish most suitable for Uranium toxicity testing in freshwater environments in northern Australia.

== Conservation status ==
This fish is classified as least concern by the International Union for Conservation of Nature on their Redlist. A wide tolerance of poor water conditions and wide distribution, although patchy in parts, make the populations of P. macleayi resilient. There is, however, the potential for harm from extreme reduction in water quality from such threats as feral pig foraging (increasing the turbidity of waterways thus reducing the light available for aquatic plant growth) and infestation by exotic plants such as water hyacinth.
