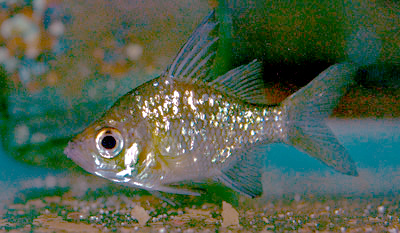
- Pseudoambassis macleayi

Scientific classification
- Kingdom: Animalia
- Phylum: Chordata
- Class: Actinopterygii
- Division: Teleostei
- Order: Mugiliformes
- Family: Ambassidae
- Genus: Pseudoambassis; Castelnau, 1878

Type species
- Pseudoambassis macleayi

Synonyms
- Austrochanda Whitley, 1935; Blandowskiella Iredale & Whitley, 1932; Velambassis Whitley, 1935

= Pseudoambassis =

Genus of ray-finned fishes

Pseudoambassis is a genus of ray-finned fish in the family Ambassidae, the Asiatic glassfishes. They are found in Australia and New Guinea (Oceania), with species inhabiting fresh and brackish coastal streams.

This genus includes fish known commonly as perchlets or glassfishes. The genus name was derived from the Greek pseudo, meaning 'false' and the related genus Ambassis.

== Species ==
There are currently 5 recognized species in this genus:

- Pseudoambassis agassizii (Steindachner, 1867) – Agassiz's olive glassfish
- Pseudoambassis agrammus (Günther, 1867) – sailfin glass perchlet
- Pseudoambassis elongata Castelnau, 1878 – yellowfin glassfish
- Pseudoambassis jacksoniensis W. J. Macleay, 1881 – Port Jackson perchlet
- Pseudoambassis macleayi Castelnau, 1878 – Macleay's glass perchlet
