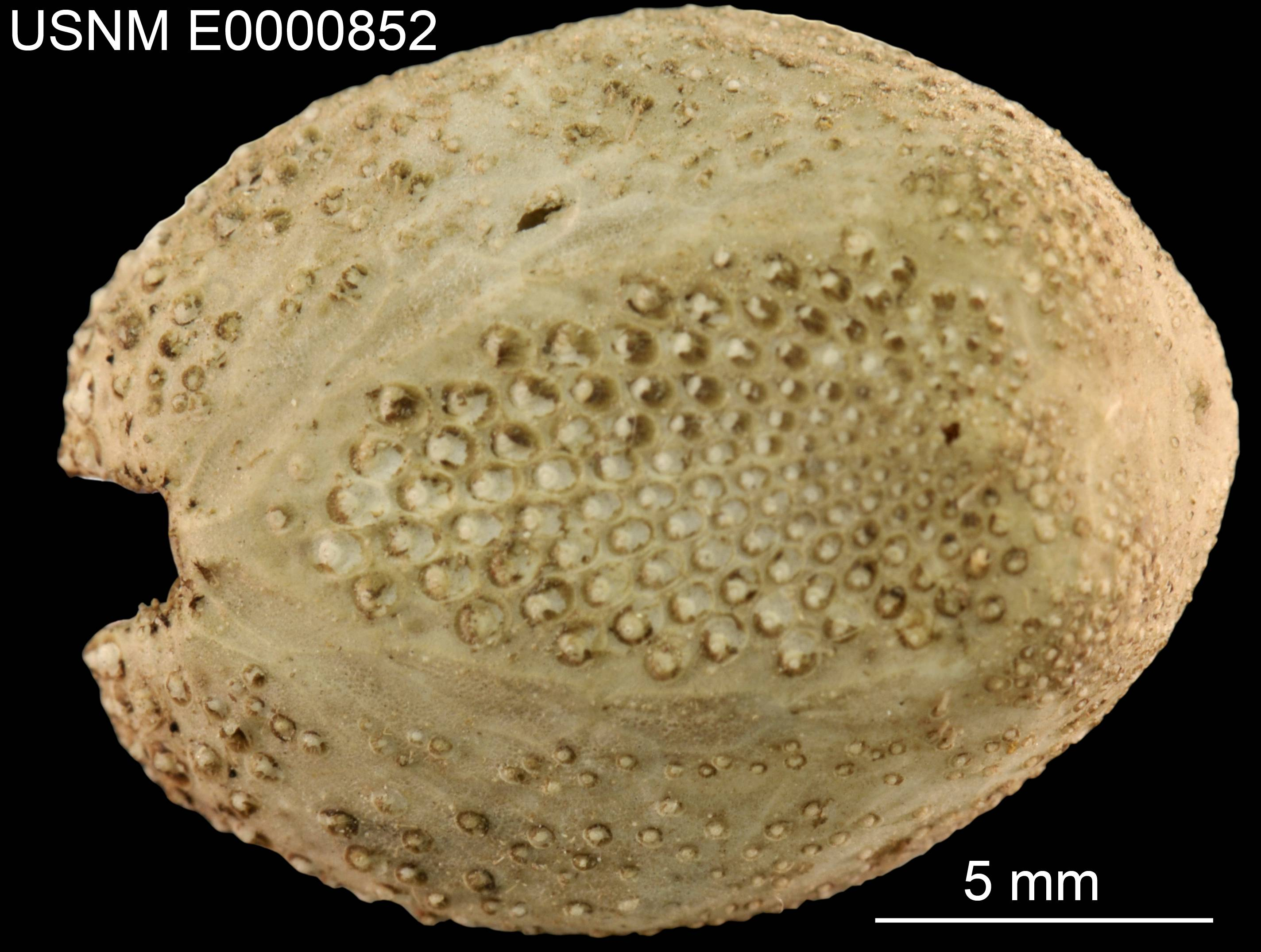

Scientific classification
- Kingdom: Animalia
- Phylum: Echinodermata
- Class: Echinoidea
- Order: Spatangoida
- Family: Schizasteridae
- Genus: Aceste; Thomson, 1877

= Aceste =

Genus of sea urchins

Aceste is a genus of echinoderms belonging to the family Schizasteridae.

The genus has almost cosmopolitan distribution.

Species:

- Aceste bellidifera Thomson, 1877
- Aceste ovata A. Agassiz & H.L. Clark, 1907
- Aceste weberi Koehler, 1914
