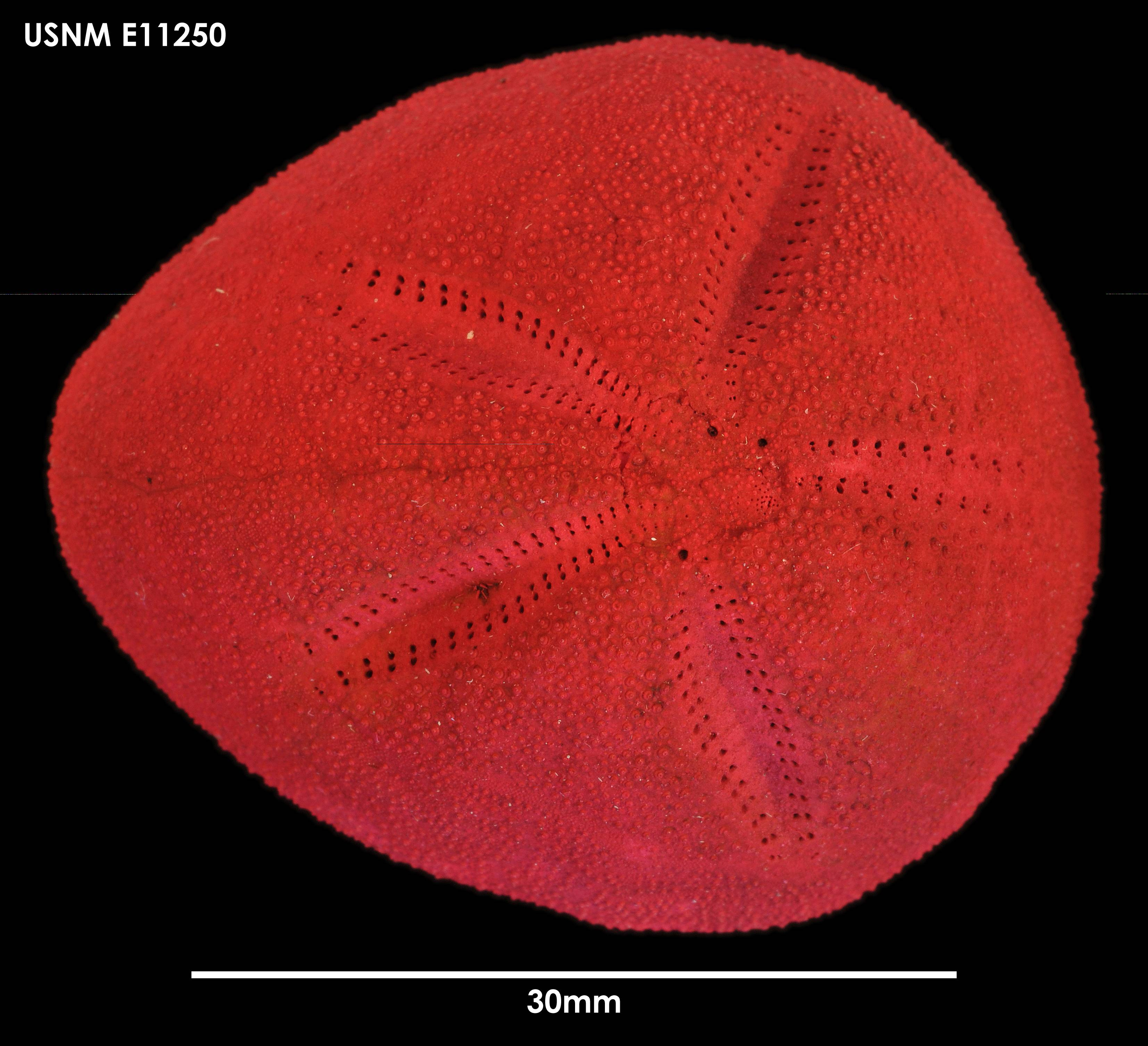

Scientific classification
- Kingdom: Animalia
- Phylum: Echinodermata
- Class: Echinoidea
- Order: Spatangoida
- Family: Schizasteridae
- Genus: Abatus
- Species: A. ingens

Binomial name
- Abatus ingens (Koehler, 1926)

= Abatus ingens =

Species of sea urchin

Abatus ingens is a species of sea urchin of the family Schizasteridae. Their armour is covered with spines. It is in the genus Abatus and lives in the sea. Abatus ingens was first scientifically described in 1926 by Koehler.
