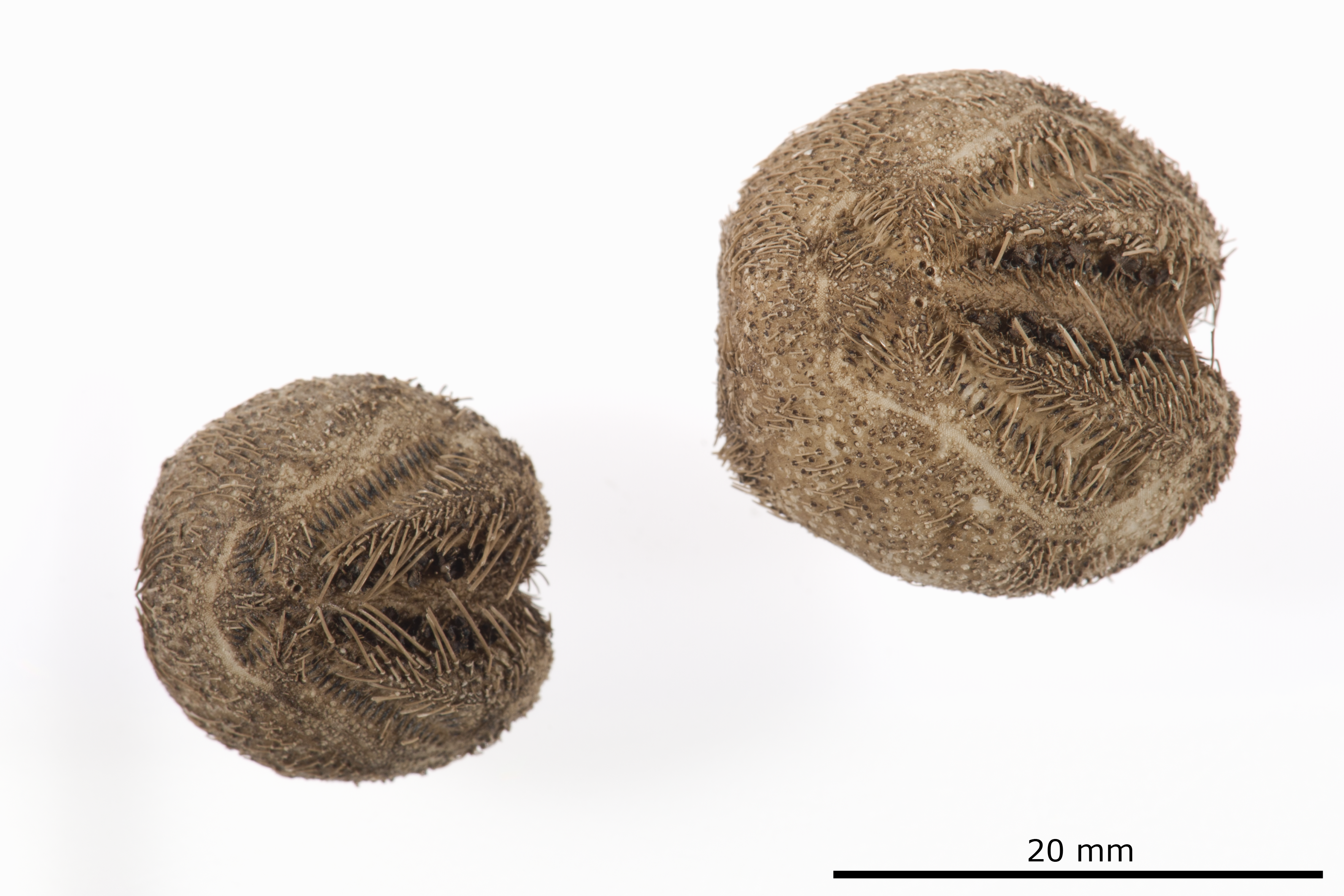

Scientific classification
- Kingdom: Animalia
- Phylum: Echinodermata
- Class: Echinoidea
- Order: Spatangoida
- Family: Schizasteridae
- Genus: Brisaster; Gray, 1855

= Brisaster =

Genus of sea urchins

Brisaster is a genus of echinoderms belonging to the family Schizasteridae.

The genus has almost cosmopolitan distribution.

Species:

- Brisaster antarcticus (Döderlein, 1906)
- Brisaster capensis (Studer, 1880)
- Brisaster fragilis (Düben & Koren, 1844)
- Brisaster kerguelenensis H.L. Clark, 1917
- Brisaster latifrons (A. Agassiz, 1898)
- Brisaster moseleyi (A. Agassiz, 1881)
- Brisaster owstoni Mortensen, 1950
- Brisaster tasmanicus McKnight, 1974
- Brisaster townsendi (A. Agassiz, 1898)
