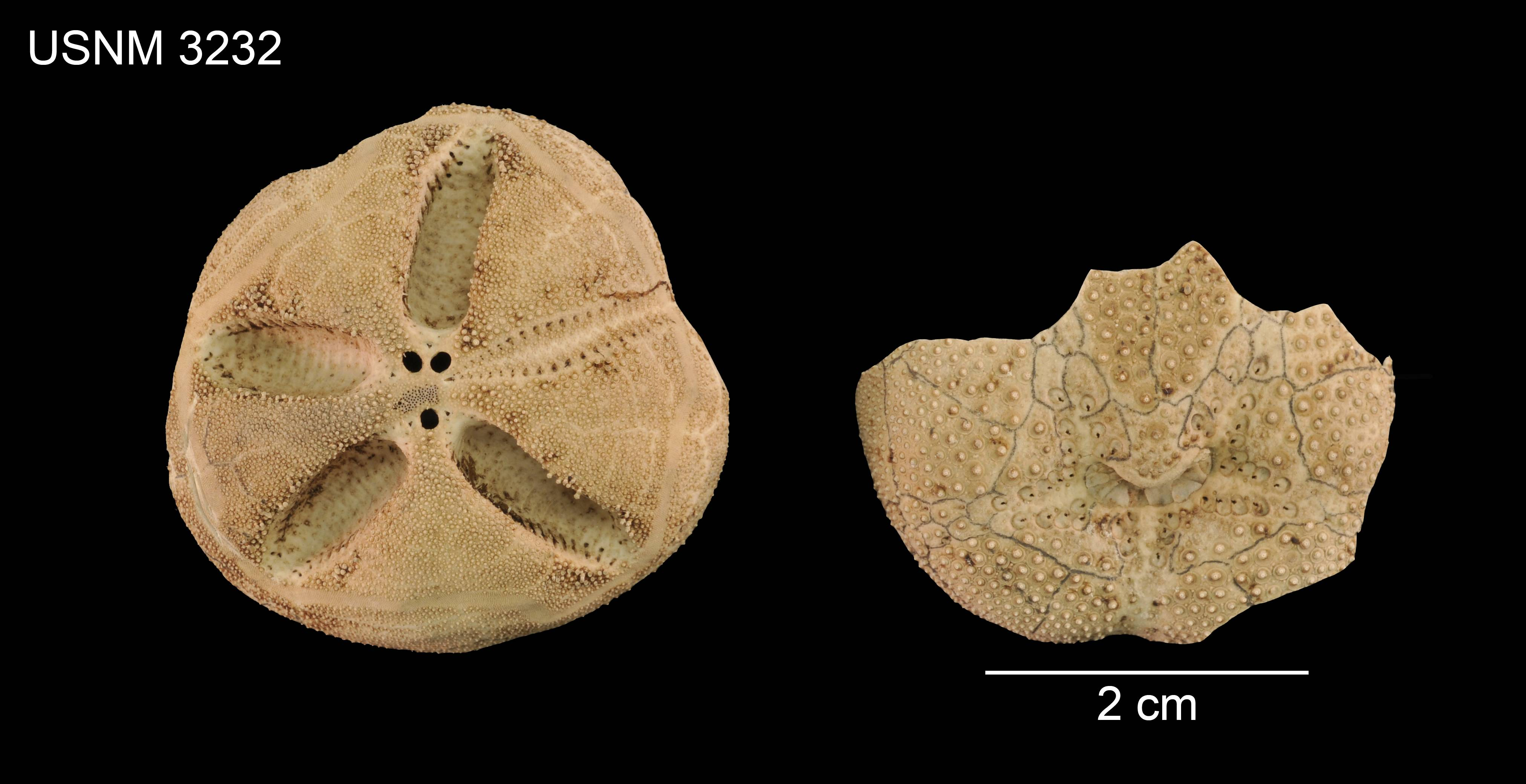
- External (above) and internal (below) views of test
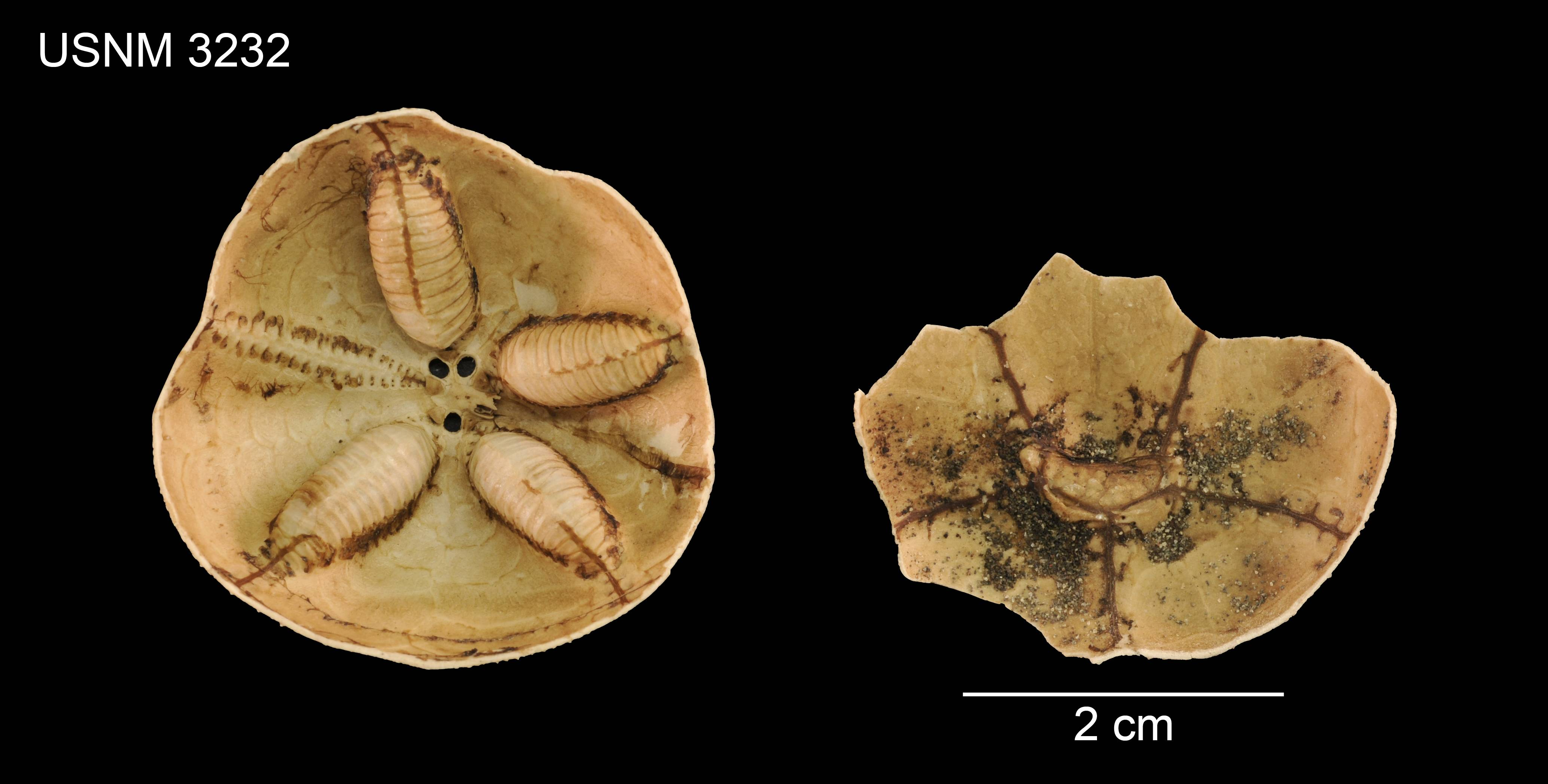

Scientific classification
- Kingdom: Animalia
- Phylum: Echinodermata
- Class: Echinoidea
- Order: Spatangoida
- Family: Schizasteridae
- Genus: Abatus
- Species: A. cordatus

Binomial name
- Abatus cordatus (Verrill, 1876)

Synonyms
- Hemiaster cordatus Verrill, 1876

= Abatus cordatus =

Species of sea urchin

Abatus cordatus is a species of sea urchin in the family Schizasteridae. It is native to shallow seas surrounding certain island groups in the southern Indian Ocean. The body is protected by a hard test or shell which is covered with spines. The female broods its young in deep pockets on the upper surface, retaining the young in place with specialised spines. American zoologist Addison Emery Verrill first scientifically described A. cordatus in 1876.

== Description ==
The test of this species is oval and bilaterally symmetrical, up to 5 cm (2 in) long. The oral (under) surface is relatively flat but the aboral (upper) surface is domed, the colour being some shade of yellowish or greenish-brown. The test is thin and fragile, and is entirely covered with spines of various lengths in different parts. The anterior ambulacrum forms a shallow depression and the other four ambulacra form a star-shaped furrow across the surface of the test; this is shallow in males, but much deeper in females, forming pockets in which the young are incubated. The pockets are protected by specialized spines. On the oral surface the spines are short and used for locomotion, while the surrounding spines are used for digging.

== Distribution and habitat ==
Abatus cordatus is endemic to certain subantarctic island groups in the southern Indian Ocean. It is known from the Kerguelen Islands, and the Heard Island and McDonald Islands. It occurs buried in soft muddy or sandy sediment, usually at depths down to about 2 m (7 ft), but has been found at depths as great as 560 m (1,800 ft).

== Ecology ==
This sea urchin is a detritivore and feeds on organic matter in the sediment. It is gonochoric, individuals being either male or female. The eggs are large and yolky, and when they have emerged from the female's gonopore, they fall into the adjacent pockets; here they undergo direct development, being brooded for about nine months, with a few dozen young in each pocket. By this time they have developed into juveniles about 2 mm (0.1 in) in diameter with mouths and spines. They then crawl away from their mother. This is the first time that direct development has been observed among sea urchins. It is not clear precisely when the eggs are fertilised, but it has been discovered that the juveniles do not necessarily all share the same father.

Because of the absence of a larval stage, most juveniles do not disperse more than a few metres from their parent. They have no known predators, and under favourable conditions can be very numerous, with up to 200 per square metre having been recorded. Their lack of ability to disperse may make them sensitive to alterations in their habitat such as changes in seawater temperatures.
