= Aglymbus =

Scientific classification
- Kingdom: Animalia
- Phylum: Arthropoda
- Class: Insecta
- Order: Coleoptera
- Suborder: Adephaga
- Family: Dytiscidae
- Subfamily: Copelatinae
- Genus: Aglymbus; Sharp, 1882

Genus of beetles

Aglymbus is a genus of beetles in the family Dytiscidae, containing the following species:

- Aglymbus alutaceus (Régimbart, 1900)
- Aglymbus bimaculatus Resende & Vanin, 1991
- Aglymbus brevicornis Sharp, 1882
- Aglymbus bromeliarum Scott, 1912
- Aglymbus elongatus (H.J.Kolbe, 1883)
- Aglymbus eminens (Kirsch, 1873)
- Aglymbus fairmairei (Zimmermann, 1919)
- Aglymbus festae (Griffini, 1899)
- Aglymbus formosulus Guignot, 1956
- Aglymbus gestroi Sharp, 1882
- Aglymbus instriolatus Zimmermann, 1923
- Aglymbus janeiroi Nilsson, 2001
- Aglymbus johannis Wewalka, 1982
- Aglymbus leprieurii (Aubé, 1838)
- Aglymbus mathaei Wewalka, 1982
- Aglymbus milloti Guignot, 1959
- Aglymbus multistriatus Nilsson, 1991
- Aglymbus optatus Sharp, 1882
- Aglymbus pallidiventris (Aubé, 1838)
- Aglymbus pilatus Guignot, 1950
- Aglymbus sculpturatus Sharp, 1882
- Aglymbus strigulifer (Régimbart, 1903)
- Aglymbus subsignatus Guignot, 1952
- Aglymbus xanthogrammus (Régimbart, 1900)
