= Yellow-fin perchlet =

Conservation status
- Least Concern (IUCN 3.1)

Scientific classification
- Kingdom: Animalia
- Phylum: Chordata
- Class: Actinopterygii
- Division: Teleostei
- Order: Mugiliformes
- Family: Ambassidae
- Genus: Pseudoambassis
- Species: P. elongata

Binomial name
- Pseudoambassis elongata Castelnau, 1878

Synonyms
- Chanda elongata (Castelnau, 1878); Ambassis elongatus (Castelnau, 1878)

Species of ray-finned fish

The yellow-fin perchlet (Pseudoambassis elongata) is a species of ray-finned fish in the family Ambassidae. It is endemic to Australia where it has only been recorded from the three rivers which drain into the Gulf of Carpentaria in northern Queensland. They are found in freshwater creeks and rivers with marginal vegetation, frequently recorded from freshwater streams that have quite high turbidity levels.
