= Schizasteridae =

Scientific classification
- Kingdom: Animalia
- Phylum: Echinodermata
- Class: Echinoidea
- Order: Spatangoida
- Suborder: Paleopneustina
- Family: Schizasteridae; Lambert, 1905

Family of sea urchins

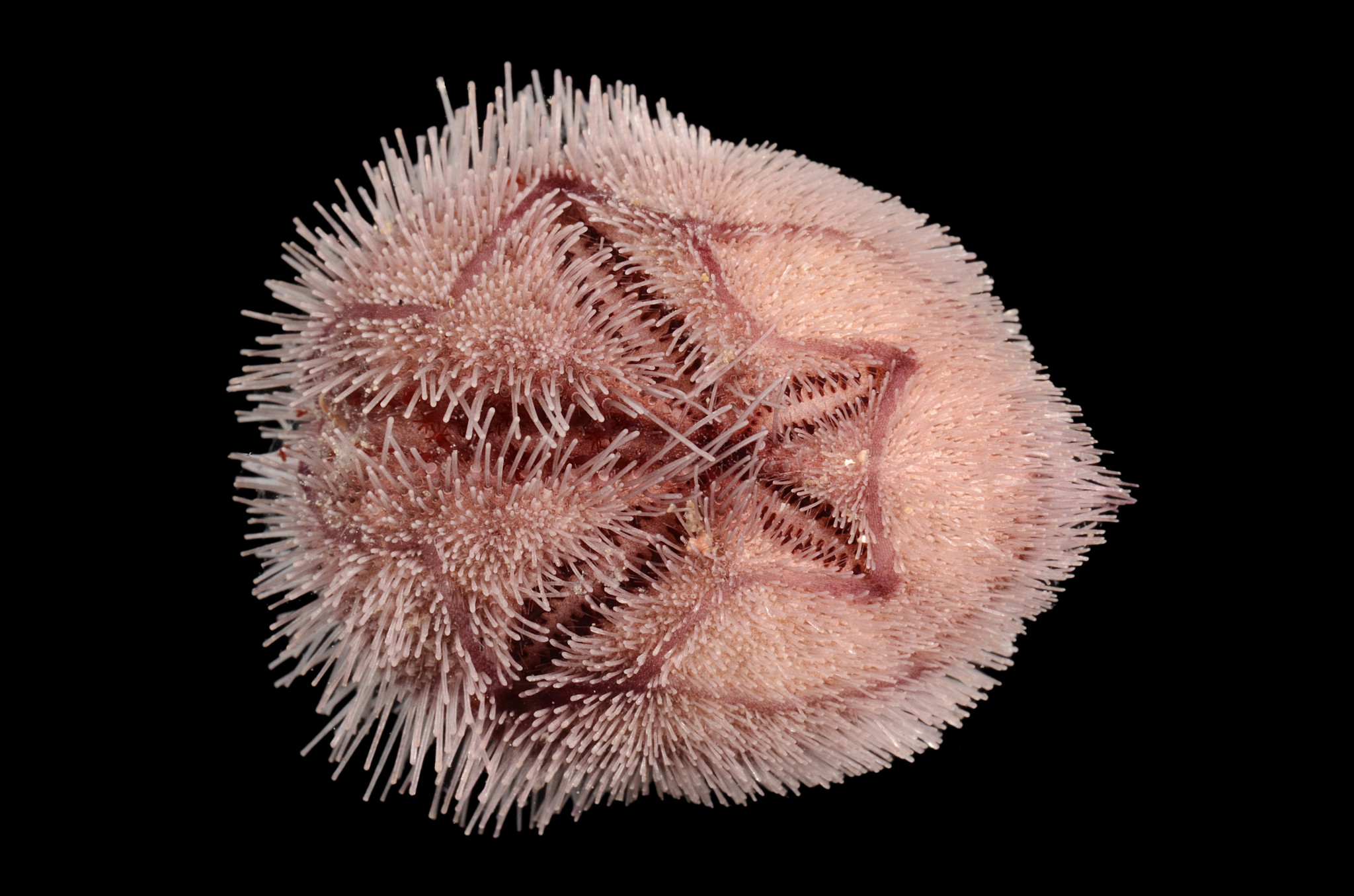
Prymnaster investigatoris

Schizasteridae is a family of echinoderms belonging to the order Spatangoida.

Genera:

- Abatus Troschel, 1851
- Aceste Thomson, 1877
- Aguayoaster Sanchez Roig, 1952 †
- Aliaster Valdinucci, 1975 †
- Brachybrissus Pomel, 1883 †
- Brisaster Gray, 1855
- Caribbaster Kier, 1984 †
- Cestobrissus Lambert, 1912 †
- Diploporaster Mortensen, 1950
- Gregoryaster Lambert, 1907 †
- Hemifaorina Jeannet & Martin, 1937 †
- Hypselaster H.L. Clark, 1917
- Lambertona Sanchez-Roig, 1953 †
- Linthia Desor, 1853 †
- Moira A. Agassiz, 1872
- Moiropsis A. Agassiz, 1881
- Opissaster Pomel, 1883 †
- Ova Gray, 1825
- Protenaster Pomel, 1883
- Prymnaster Koehler, 1914
- Schizaster L. Agassiz, 1835
- Schizopneustes Thiéry, 1907 †
- Tripylaster Mortensen, 1907
