= Brissopsis persica =

Scientific classification
- Kingdom: Animalia
- Phylum: Echinodermata
- Class: Echinoidea
- Order: Spatangoida
- Family: Brissidae
- Genus: Brissus
- Species: B. persica

Binomial name
- Brissus persica (Ole Theodor Jensen Mortensen, 1940)

Species of sea urchin

Brissopsis persica is a species of sea urchins of the Family Brissidae. Their armour is covered with spines. Brissopsis persica was first scientifically described in 1940 by Ole Theodor Jensen Mortensen.

== See also ==
- Brissopsis pacifica
- Brissopsis parallela
- Brissopsis similis
