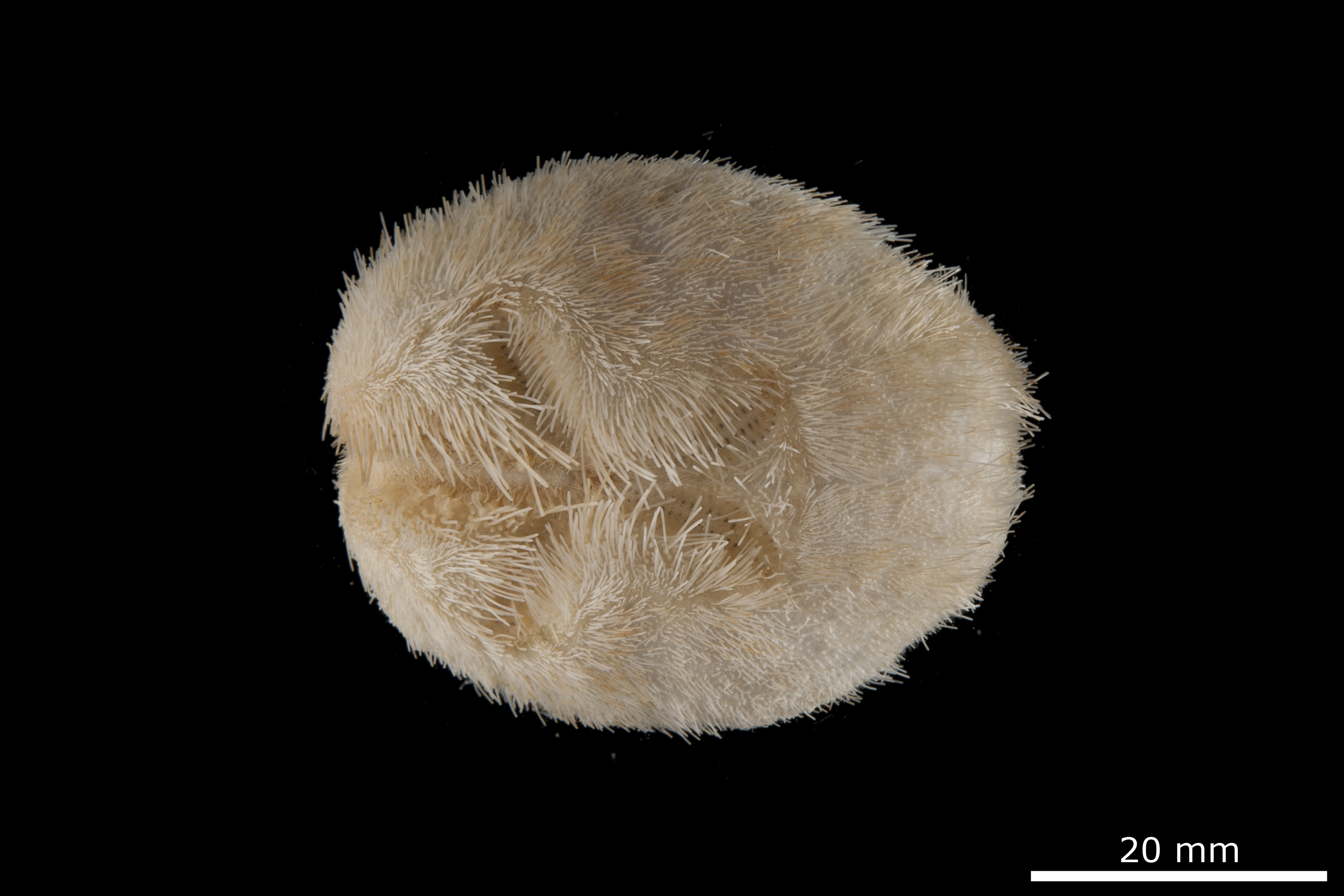

Scientific classification
- Kingdom: Animalia
- Phylum: Echinodermata
- Class: Echinoidea
- Order: Spatangoida
- Family: Brissidae
- Genus: Brissopsis
- Species: B. elongata

Binomial name
- Brissopsis elongata Mortensen, 1907

= Brissopsis elongata =

Species of sea urchin

Brissopsis elongata is a species of sea urchins of the family Brissidae. Their armour is covered with spines. Brissopsis elongata was first scientifically described in 1907 by Ole Theodor Jensen Mortensen.
