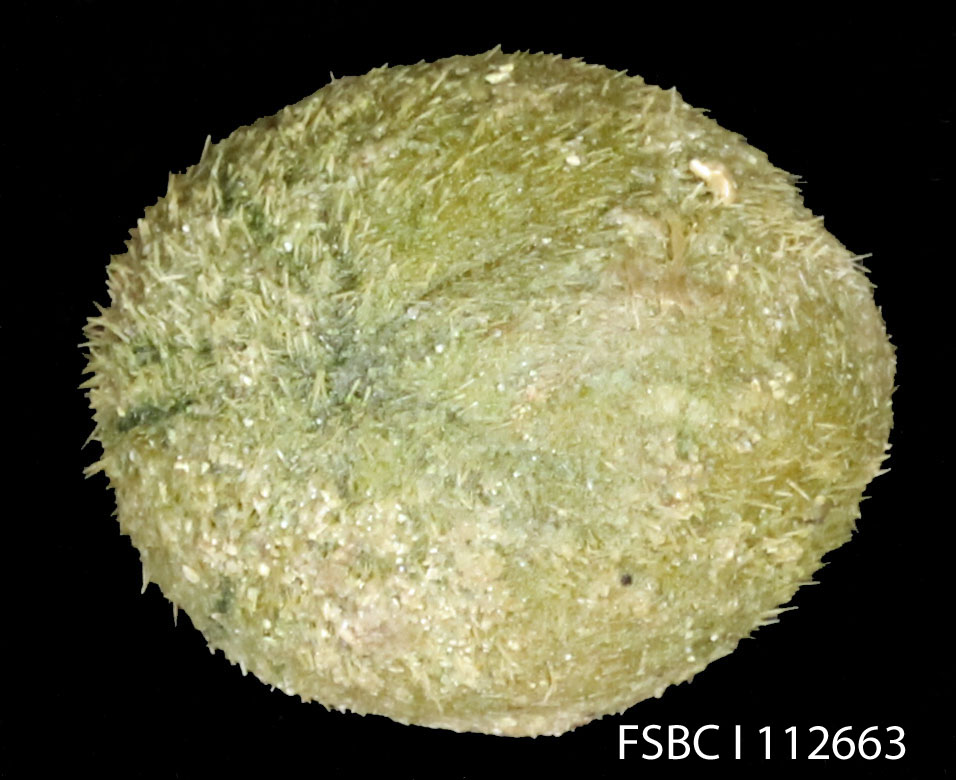

Scientific classification
- Kingdom: Animalia
- Phylum: Echinodermata
- Class: Echinoidea
- Order: Spatangoida
- Family: Brissidae
- Genus: Brissopsis
- Species: B. alta

Binomial name
- Brissopsis alta Mortensen, 1907

= Brissopsis alta =

Species of sea urchin

Brissopsis alta is a species of sea urchins of the family Brissidae. Their armour is covered with spines. Brissopsis alta was first scientifically described in 1907 by Ole Mortensen.
