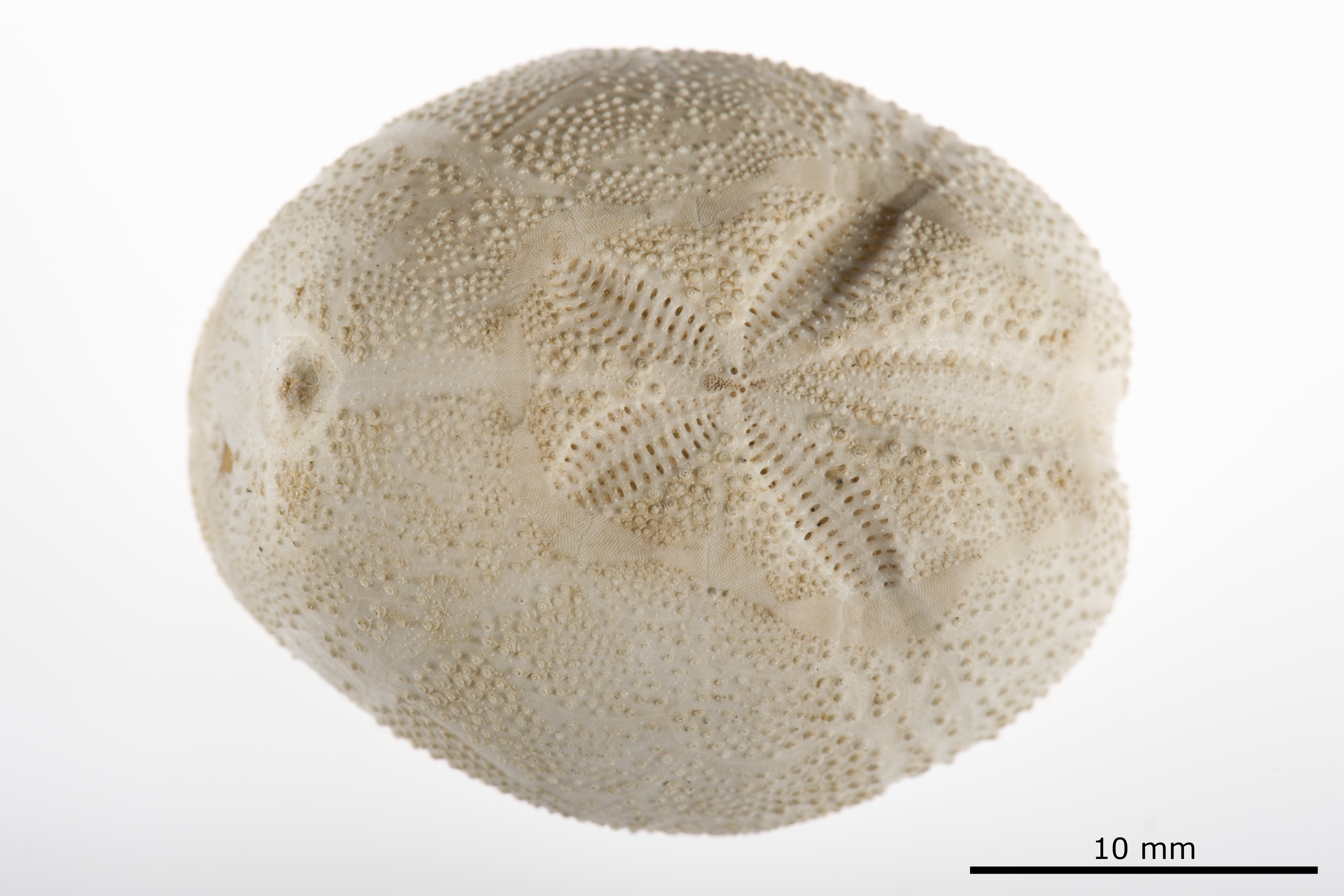
- Brissopsis zealandiae

Scientific classification
- Kingdom: Animalia
- Phylum: Echinodermata
- Class: Echinoidea
- Order: Spatangoida
- Family: Brissidae
- Genus: Brissopsis
- Species: B. zealandiae

Binomial name
- Brissopsis zealandiae Mortensen, 1921

= Brissopsis zealandiae =

Species of sea urchin

Brissopsis zealandiae is a species of sea urchins of the family Brissidae. Their armour is covered with spines. Brissopsis zealandiae was first scientifically described in 1921 by Ole Theodor Jensen Mortensen.
