= Brissopsis obliqua =

Scientific classification
- Kingdom: Animalia
- Phylum: Echinodermata
- Class: Echinoidea
- Order: Spatangoida
- Family: Brissidae
- Genus: Brissopsis
- Species: B. obliqua

Binomial name
- Brissopsis obliqua Mortensen, 1948

Species of sea urchin

Brissopsis obliqua is a species of sea urchins of the family Brissidae. Their armour is covered with spines. Brissopsis obliqua was first scientifically described in 1948 by Ole Theodor Jensen Mortensen.
