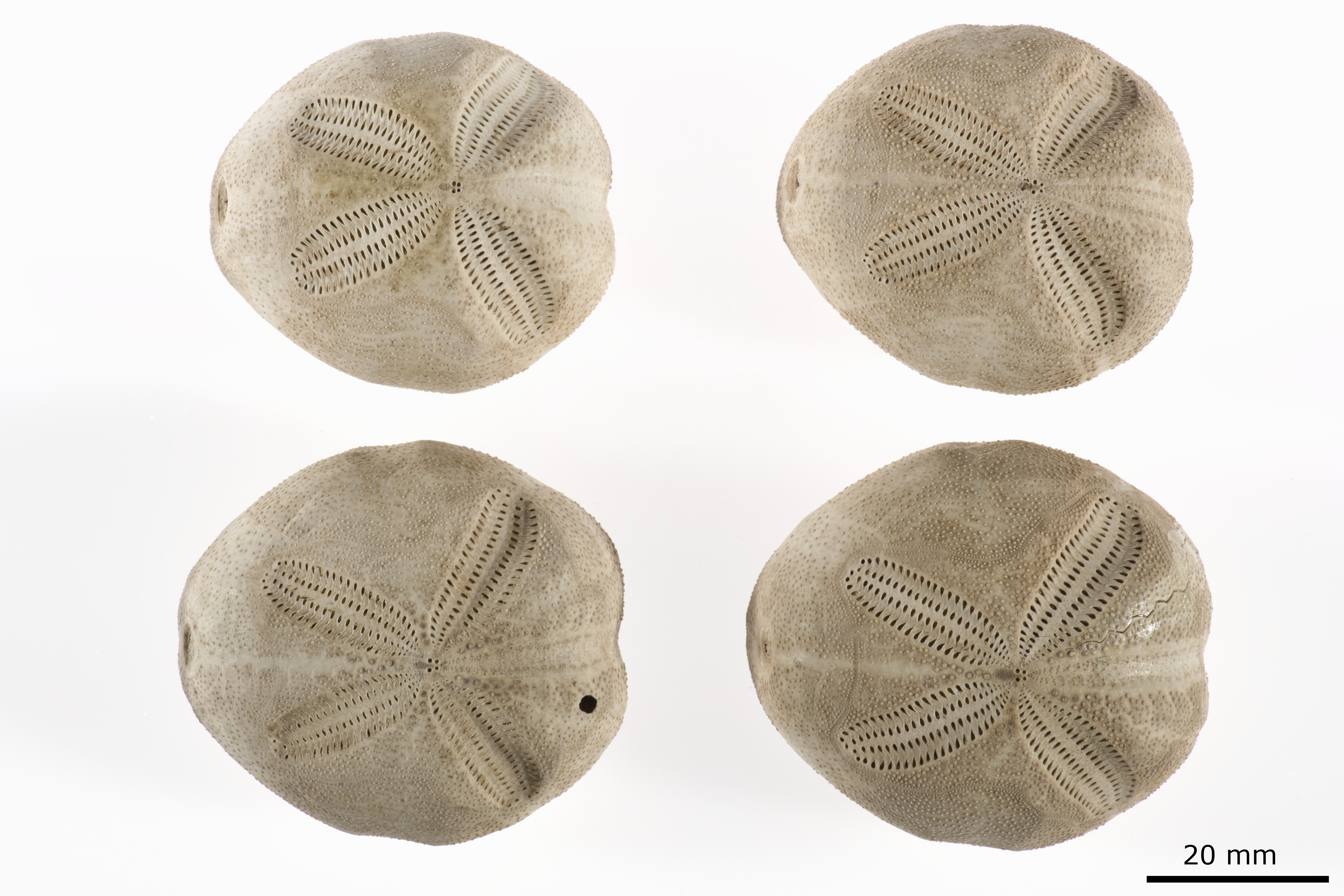
- Brissopsis evanescens

Scientific classification
- Kingdom: Animalia
- Phylum: Echinodermata
- Class: Echinoidea
- Order: Spatangoida
- Family: Brissidae
- Genus: Brissopsis
- Species: B. evanescens

Binomial name
- Brissopsis evanescens Mortensen, 1950

= Brissopsis evanescens =

Species of sea urchin

Brissopsis evanescens is a species of sea urchins of the family Brissidae. Their armour is covered with spines. Brissopsis evanescens was first scientifically described in 1950 by Ole Theodor Jensen Mortensen.
