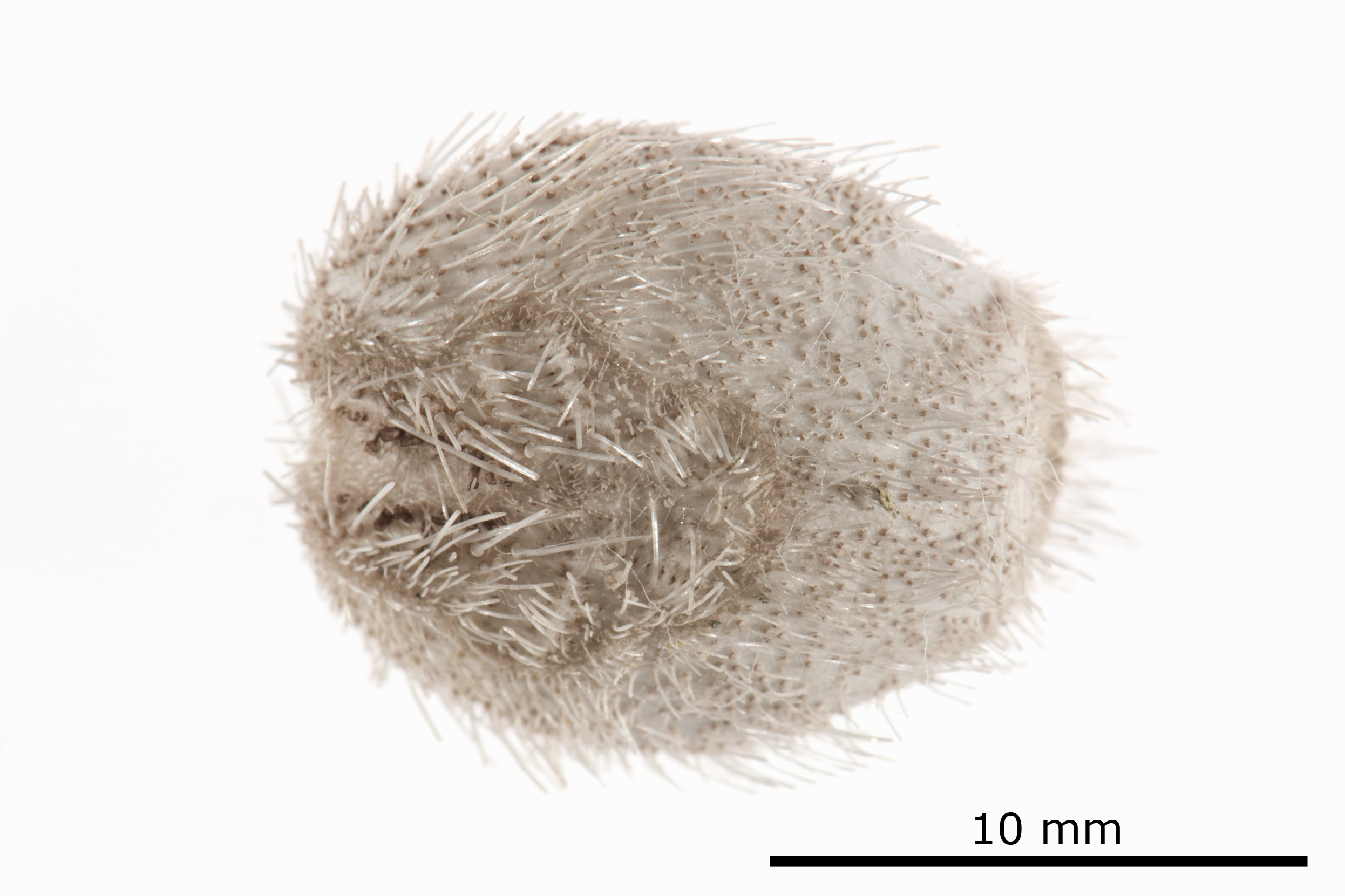
- Brissopsis jarli

Scientific classification
- Kingdom: Animalia
- Phylum: Echinodermata
- Class: Echinoidea
- Order: Spatangoida
- Family: Brissidae
- Genus: Brissopsis
- Species: B. jarlii

Binomial name
- Brissopsis jarlii Mortensen, 1951

= Brissopsis jarlii =

Species of sea urchin

Brissopsis jarlii is a species of sea urchins of the family Brissidae. Their armour is covered with spines. Brissopsis jarlii was first scientifically described in 1951 by Ole Theodor Jensen Mortensen.
