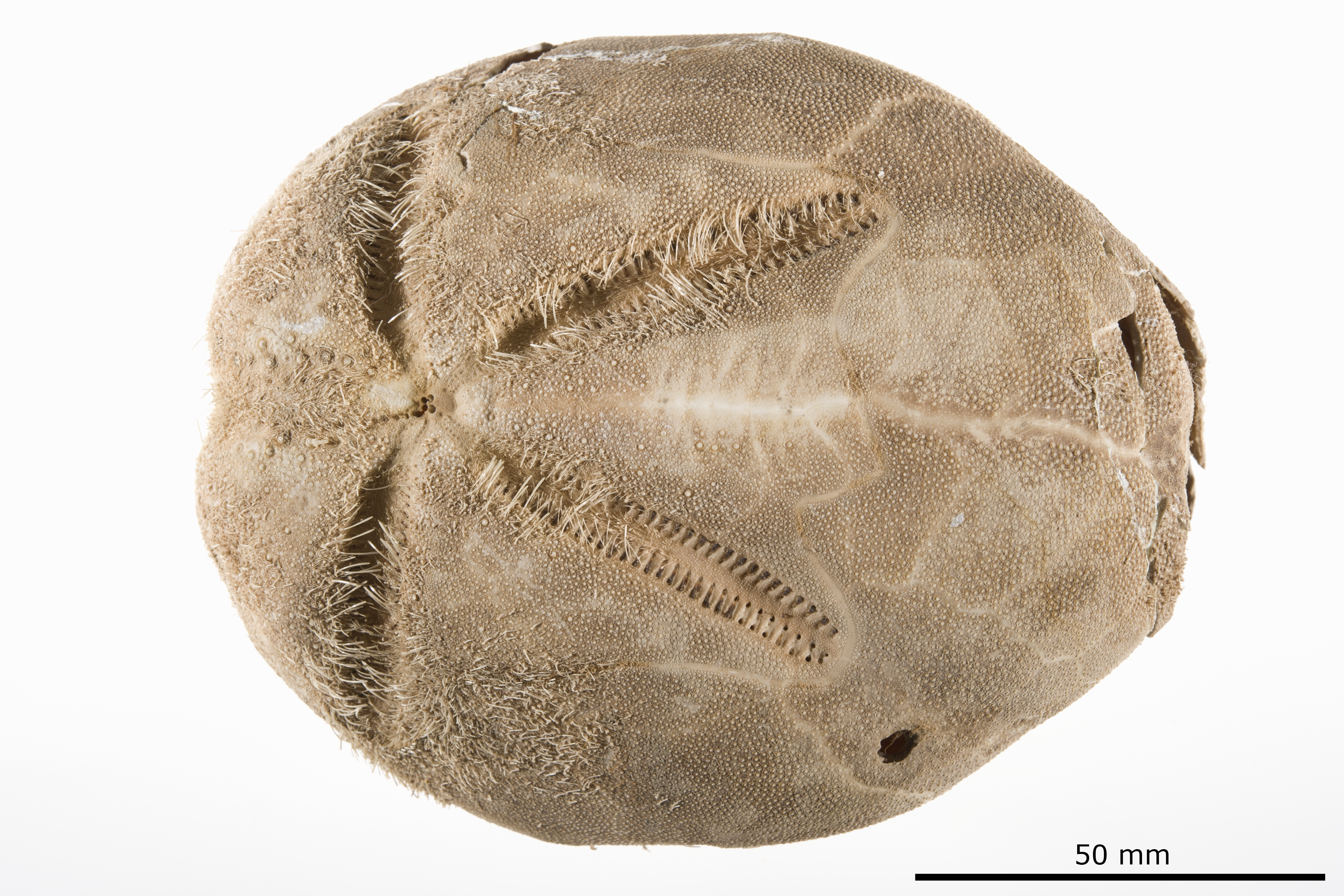

Scientific classification
- Domain: Eukaryota
- Kingdom: Animalia
- Phylum: Echinodermata
- Class: Echinoidea
- Order: Spatangoida
- Family: Brissidae
- Genus: Anametalia
- Species: A. grandis

Binomial name
- Anametalia grandis (Mortensen, 1950)

= Anametalia grandis =

Species of sea urchin

Anametalia grandis is a species of sea urchin of the family Brissidae. Their armour is covered with spines. It is placed in the genus Anametalia and lives in the sea. Anametalia grandis was first scientifically described in 1950 by Ole Mortensen.
