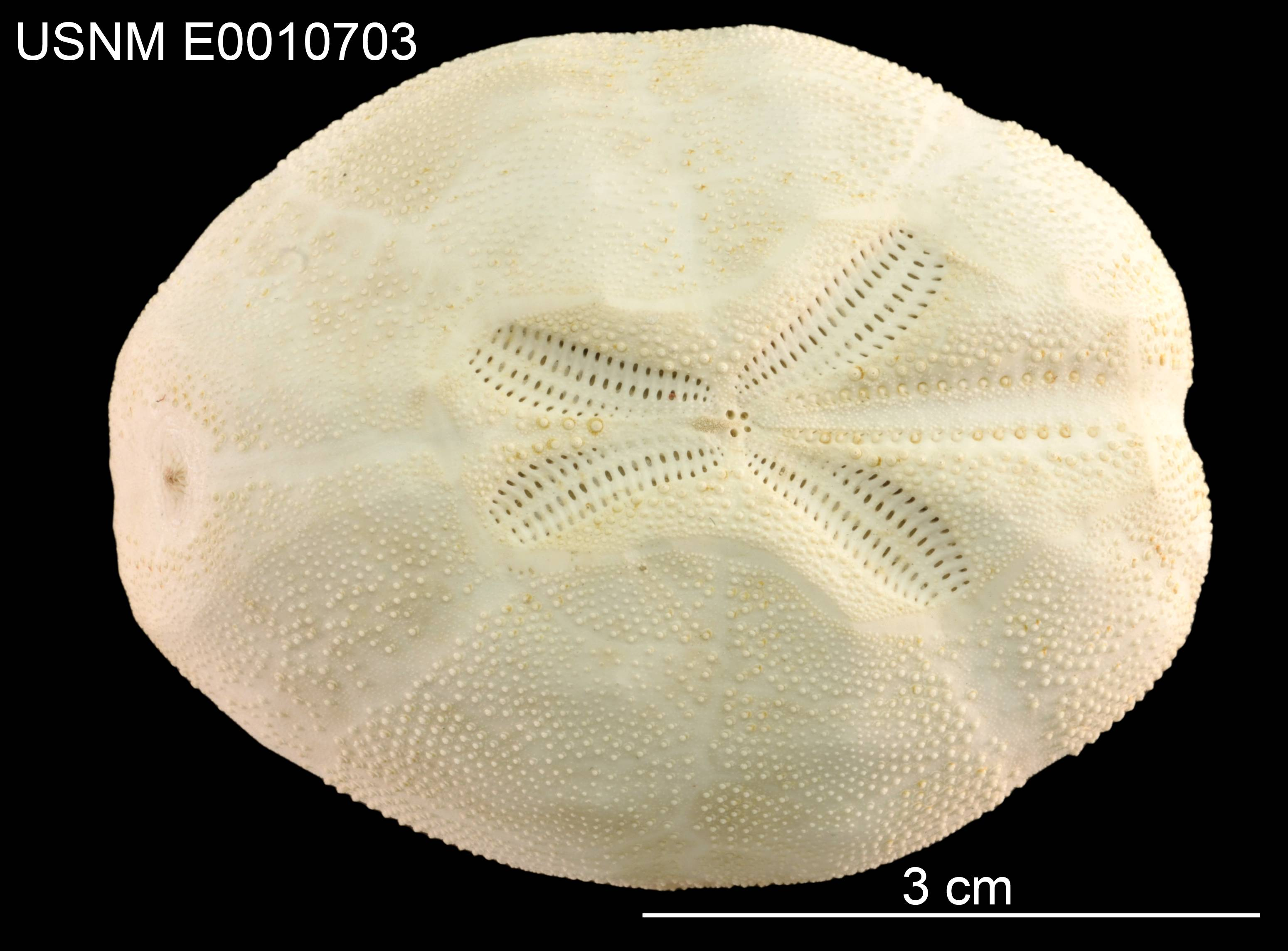
- Preserved specimen of Brissopsis atlantica

Conservation status
- Secure (NatureServe)

Scientific classification
- Kingdom: Animalia
- Phylum: Echinodermata
- Class: Echinoidea
- Order: Spatangoida
- Family: Brissidae
- Genus: Brissopsis
- Species: B. atlantica

Binomial name
- Brissopsis atlantica (Ole Theodor Jensen Mortensen, 1907)

= Brissopsis atlantica =

Species of sea urchin

Brissopsis atlantica is a species of sea urchin of the family Brissidae. Their armour is covered with spines. Brissopsis atlantica was first scientifically described in 1907 by Ole Theodor Jensen Mortensen.
