= Aspidodiadema sinuosum =

Scientific classification
- Domain: Eukaryota
- Kingdom: Animalia
- Phylum: Echinodermata
- Class: Echinoidea
- Order: Aspidodiadematoida
- Family: Aspidodiadematidae
- Genus: Aspidodiadema
- Species: A. sinuosum

Binomial name
- Aspidodiadema sinuosum (Mironov, 1981)

Species of sea urchin

Aspidodiadema sinuosum is a species of sea urchin of the family Aspidodiadematidae. Their armour is covered with spines. It is placed in the genus Aspidodiadema and lives in the sea. Aspidodiadema sinuosum was first scientifically described in 1981 by Mironov.

== See also ==
- Aspidodiadema montanum
- Aspidodiadema nicobaricum
- Aspidodiadema tonsum
