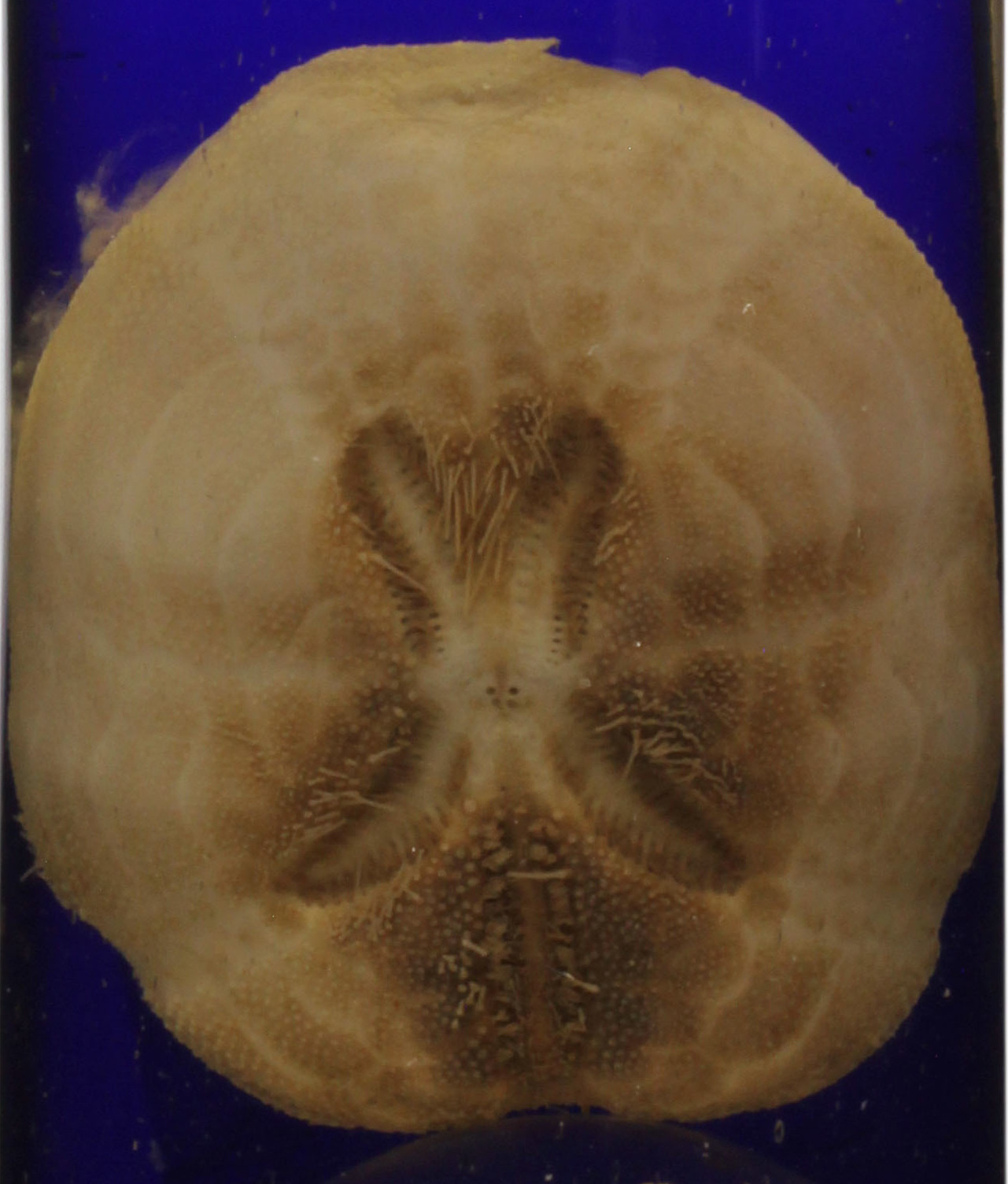

Scientific classification
- Kingdom: Animalia
- Phylum: Echinodermata
- Class: Echinoidea
- Order: Spatangoida
- Family: Brissidae
- Genus: Brissopsis
- Species: B. bengalensis

Binomial name
- Brissopsis bengalensis Koehler, 1914

= Brissopsis bengalensis =

Species of sea urchin

Brissopsis bengalensis is a species of sea urchins of the family Brissidae. Their armour is covered with spines. Brissopsis bengalensis was first scientifically described in 1914 by Koehler.
