= A. africanum =

A. africanum may refer to:

- Aciagrion africanum, a damselfly
- Anonychium africanum, a legume
- Aspidodiadema africanum, a sea urchin
- Atherion africanum, a fish
