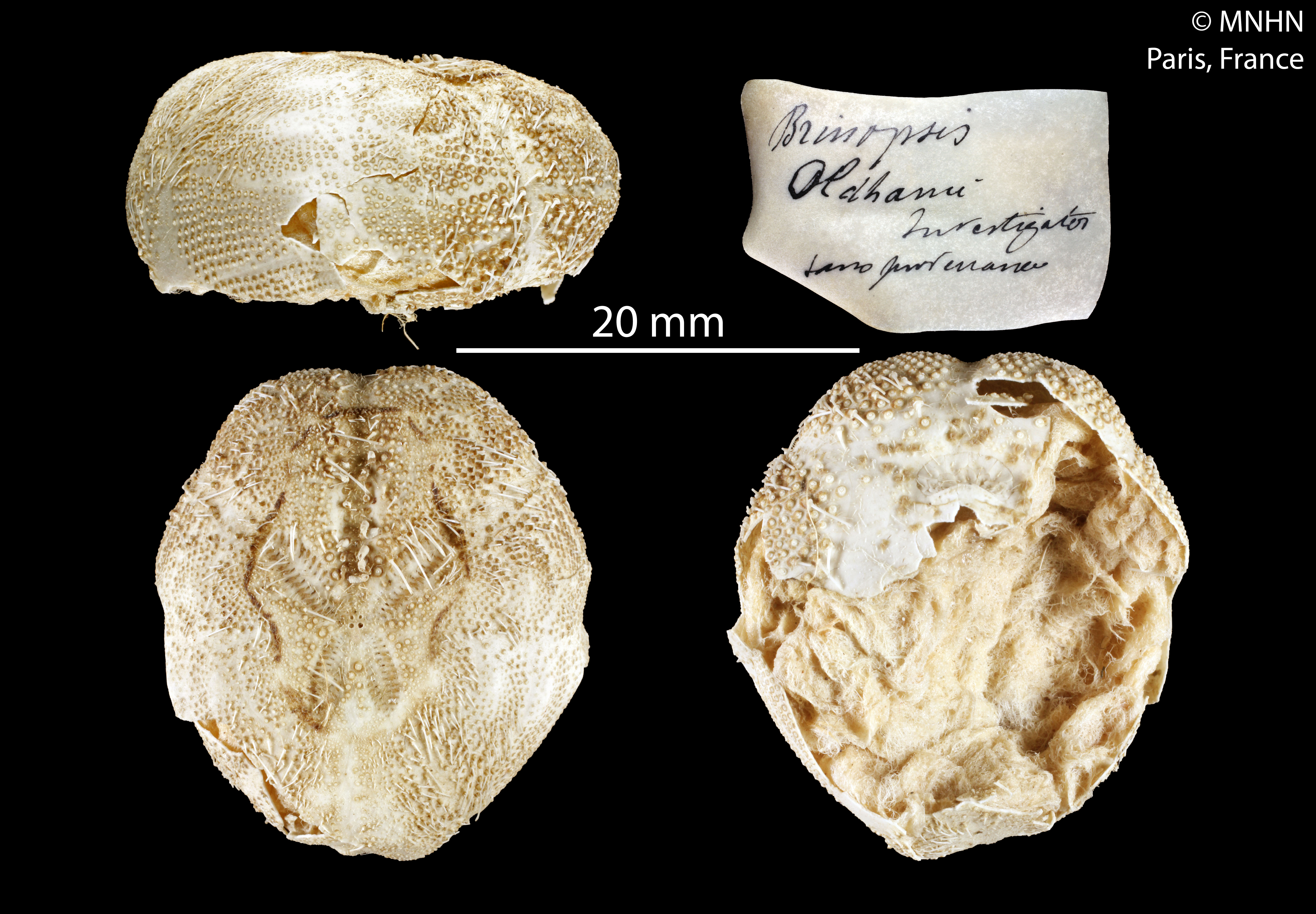

Scientific classification
- Kingdom: Animalia
- Phylum: Echinodermata
- Class: Echinoidea
- Order: Spatangoida
- Family: Brissidae
- Genus: Brissopsis
- Species: B. oldhami

Binomial name
- Brissopsis oldhami Alcock, 1893

= Brissopsis oldhami =

Species of sea urchin

Brissopsis oldhami is a species of sea urchins of the family Brissidae. Their armour is covered with spines. Brissopsis oldhami was first scientifically described in 1893 by Alcock.
