= Anabrissus =

Scientific classification
- Kingdom: Animalia
- Phylum: Echinodermata
- Class: Echinoidea
- Order: Spatangoida
- Family: Brissidae
- Genus: Anabrissus; Mortensen, 1950
- Species: A. damesi

Binomial name
- Anabrissus damesi (Agassiz, 1881)

Species of sea urchin

Anabrissus damesi is a species of sea urchin of the family Brissidae. Their armour is covered with spines. It is the only species in the genus Anabrissus and lives in the sea. Anabrissus damesi was first scientifically described in 1881 by Alexander Agassiz, American scientist and engineer.
