= Aspidodiadema meijerei =

Scientific classification
- Kingdom: Animalia
- Phylum: Echinodermata
- Class: Echinoidea
- Order: Aspidodiadematoida
- Family: Aspidodiadematidae
- Genus: Aspidodiadema
- Species: A. meijerei

Binomial name
- Aspidodiadema meijerei (Döderlein, 1906)

Species of sea urchin

Aspidodiadema meijerei is a species of sea urchin of the family Aspidodiadematidae. Its armor is covered with spines. It is placed in the genus Aspidodiadema and lives in the sea. Aspidodiadema meijerei was first scientifically described in 1906 by Döderlein.

== See also ==
- Aspidodiadema intermedium
- Aspidodiadema jacobyi
- Aspidodiadema montanum
