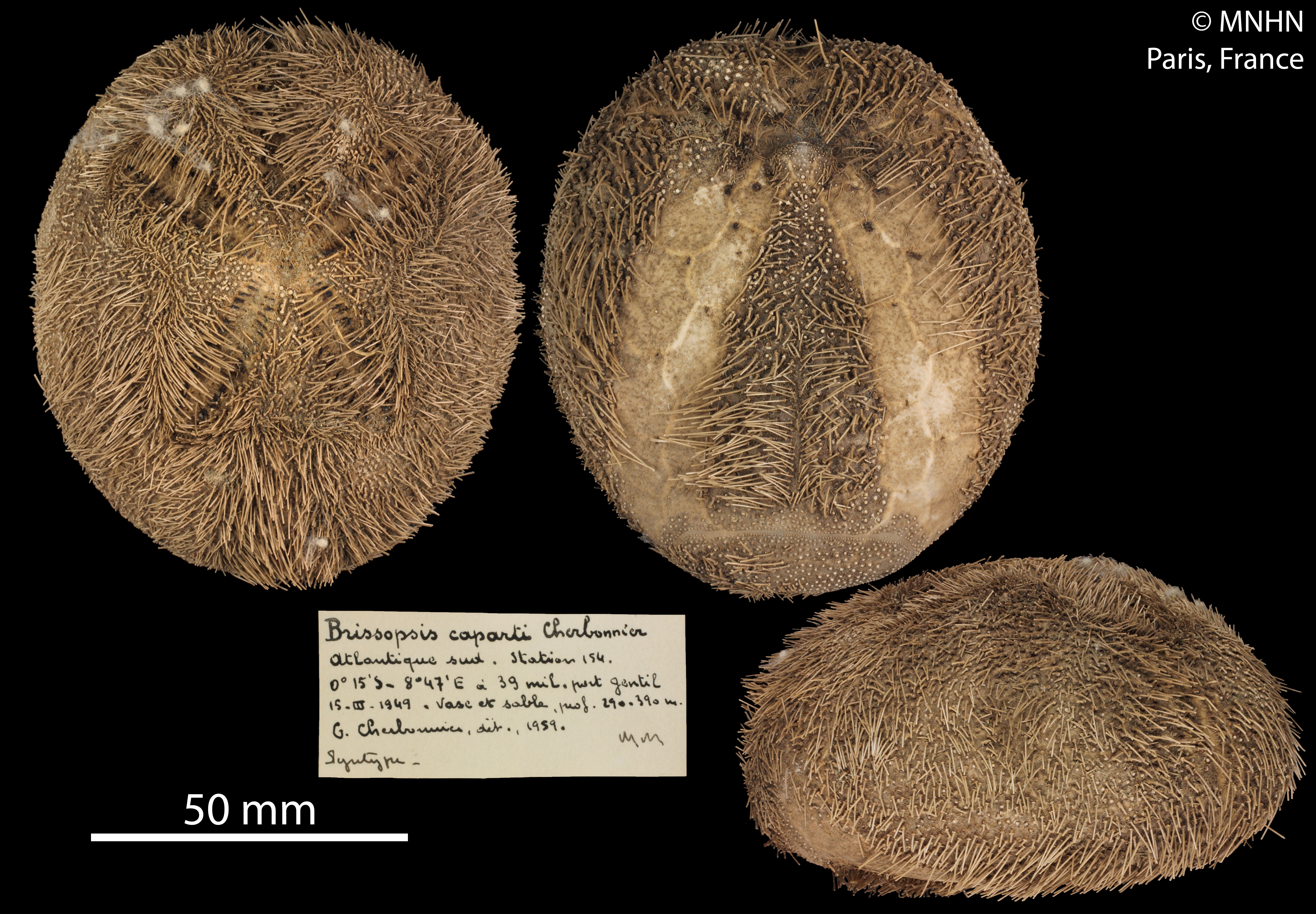

Scientific classification
- Kingdom: Animalia
- Phylum: Echinodermata
- Class: Echinoidea
- Order: Spatangoida
- Family: Brissidae
- Genus: Brissopsis
- Species: B. caparti

Binomial name
- Brissopsis caparti Cherbonnier, 1959

= Brissopsis caparti =

Species of sea urchin

Brissopsis caparti is a species of sea urchins of the family Brissidae. Their armour is covered with spines. Brissopsis caparti was first scientifically described in 1959 by Cherbonnier.
