= Brissopsis columbaris =

Scientific classification
- Kingdom: Animalia
- Phylum: Echinodermata
- Class: Echinoidea
- Order: Spatangoida
- Family: Brissidae
- Genus: Brissopsis
- Species: B. columbaris

Binomial name
- Brissopsis columbaris Agassiz, 1898

Species of sea urchin

Brissopsis columbaris is a species of sea urchins of the family Brissidae. Their armour is covered with spines. Brissopsis columbaris was first scientifically described in 1898 by Alexander Emanuel Agassiz.
