= Aspidodiadema nicobaricum =

Scientific classification
- Kingdom: Animalia
- Phylum: Echinodermata
- Class: Echinoidea
- Order: Aspidodiadematoida
- Family: Aspidodiadematidae
- Genus: Aspidodiadema
- Species: A. nicobaricum

Binomial name
- Aspidodiadema nicobaricum (Döderlein, 1901)

Species of sea urchin

Aspidodiadema nicobaricum is a species of sea urchin of the family Aspidodiadematidae. Their armour is covered with spines. It is placed in the genus Aspidodiadema and lives in the sea. Aspidodiadema nicobaricum was first scientifically described in 1901 by Döderlein.

== See also ==
- Aspidodiadema meijerei
- Aspidodiadema montanum
- Aspidodiadema sinuosum
