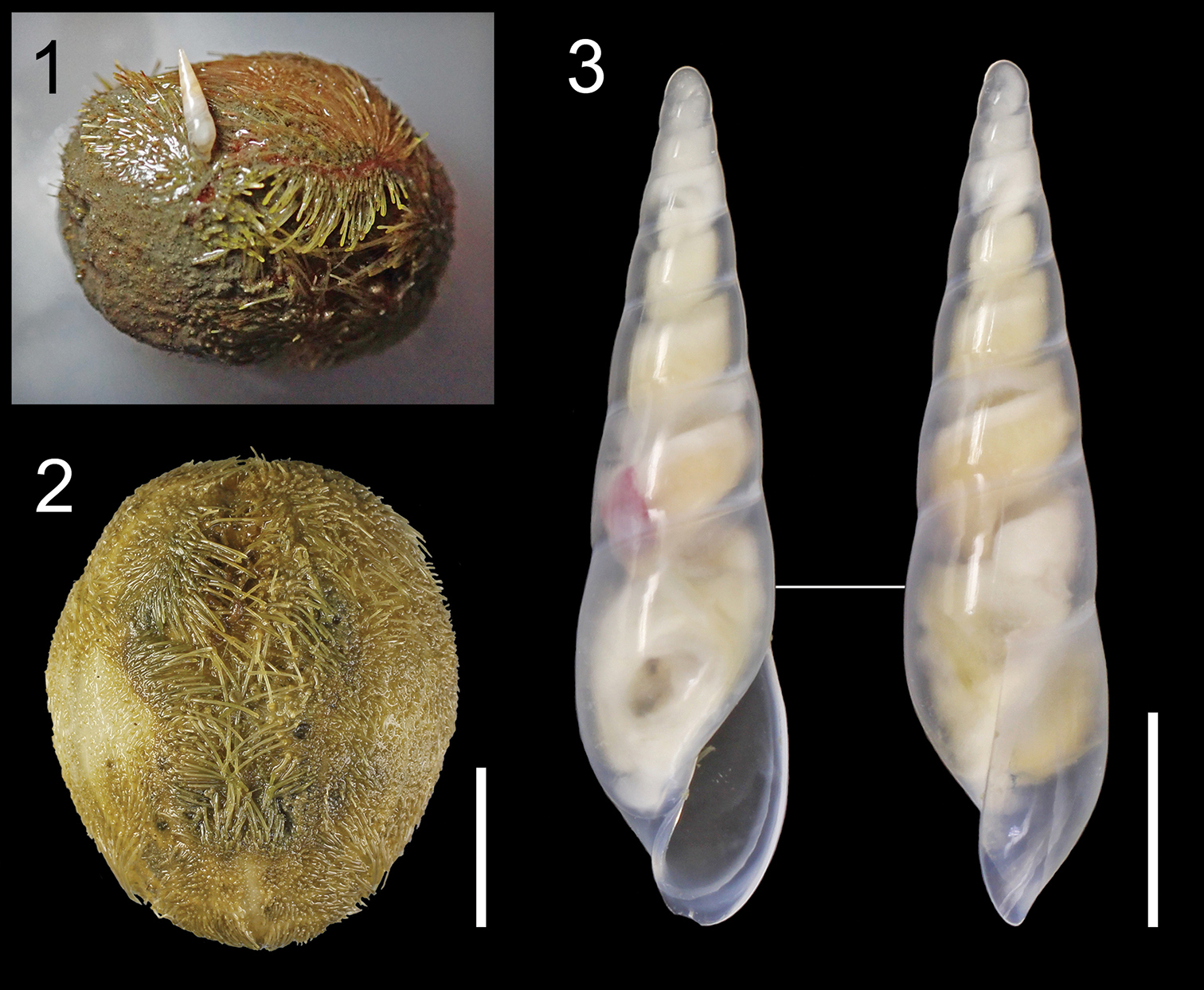
- Shell of Haliella seisuimaruae and its host sea urchin Brissopsis sp. cf. luzonica

Scientific classification
- Kingdom: Animalia
- Phylum: Mollusca
- Class: Gastropoda
- Subclass: Caenogastropoda
- Order: Littorinimorpha
- Family: Eulimidae
- Genus: Haliella; Monterosato, 1878

Type species
- Eulima stenostoma Jeffreys, 1858

Synonyms
- Halliella Monterosato, 1878

= Haliella =

Genus of gastropods

Haliella is a genus of sea snails, marine gastropod mollusks in the family Eulimidae.

== General characteristics ==
Eulimidae in which the inner lip is provided with a twist which gives it the appearance of having an obsolete fold.

== Species ==
Species within this genus include the following:

- Haliella abyssicola (Bartsch, 1917)
- Haliella canarica (Bouchet & Warén, 1986)
- Haliella chilensis (Bartsch, 1917)
- Haliella seisuimaruae Takano, Kimura & Kano, 2020
- Haliella stenostoma (Jeffreys, 1861)
- † Haliella tyrrhena Di Geronimo & La Perna, 1999
- Haliella ventricosa Feng, 1996

Species brought into synonymy

- Haliella geographica (de Folin, 1887): synonym of Haliella stenostoma (Jeffreys, 1861)
- Haliella lomana (Dall, 1908): synonym of Eulimella lomana (Dall, 1908)
