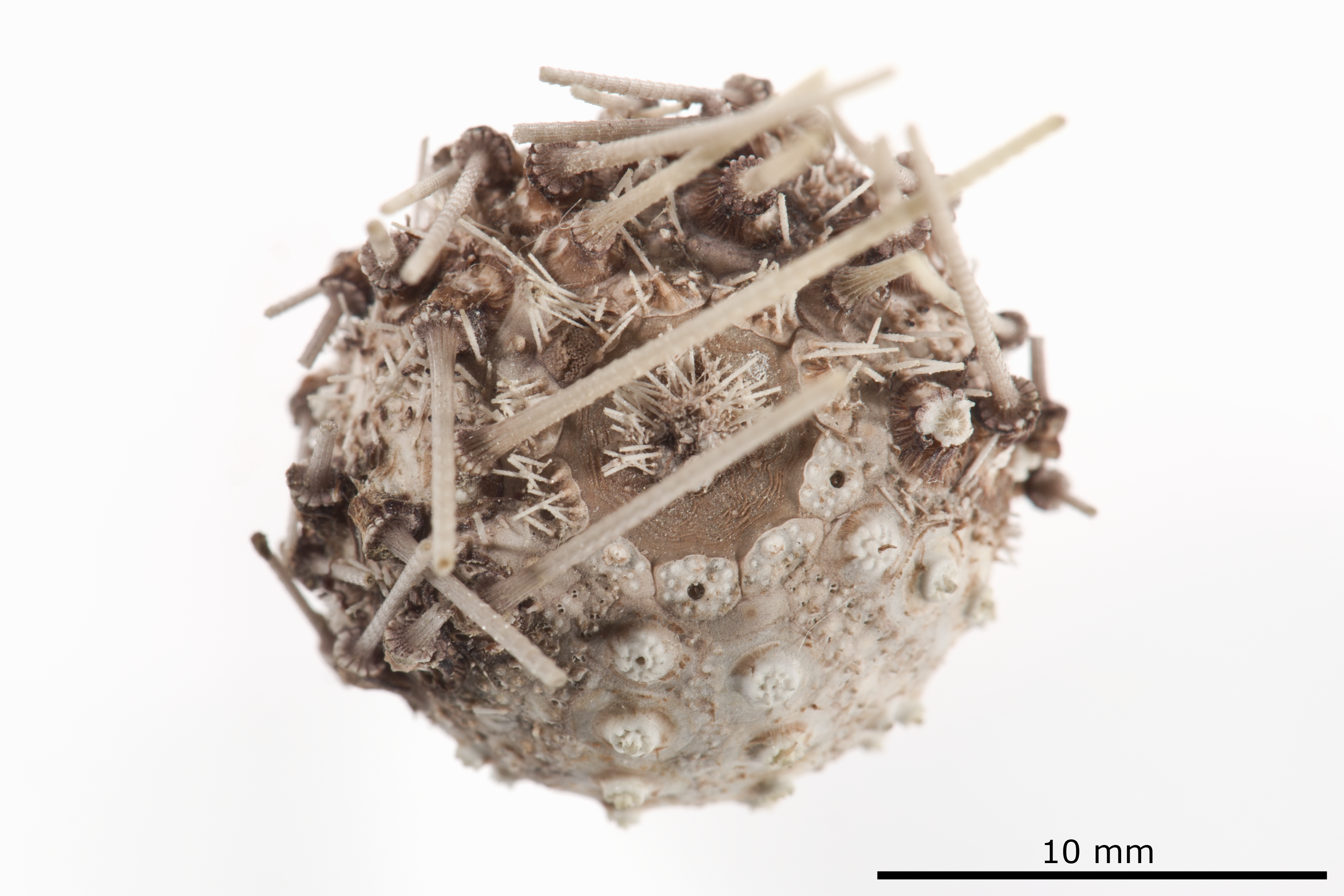
- Aspidodiadema africanum

Scientific classification
- Domain: Eukaryota
- Kingdom: Animalia
- Phylum: Echinodermata
- Class: Echinoidea
- Order: Aspidodiadematoida
- Family: Aspidodiadematidae
- Genus: Aspidodiadema
- Species: A. africanum

Binomial name
- Aspidodiadema africanum (Mortensen, 1939)

= Aspidodiadema africanum =

Species of sea urchin

Aspidodiadema africanum is a species of sea urchin of the family Aspidodiadematidae. Their armour is covered with spines. It is placed in the genus Aspidodiadema and lives in the sea. Aspidodiadema africanum was first scientifically described in 1939 by Ole Theodor Jensen Mortensen, a Danish scientist.

== See also ==
- Argopatagus planus
- Argopatagus vitreus
- Aspidodiadema annulatum
