= Anametalia regularis =

Scientific classification
- Domain: Eukaryota
- Kingdom: Animalia
- Phylum: Echinodermata
- Class: Echinoidea
- Order: Spatangoida
- Family: Brissidae
- Genus: Anametalia
- Species: A. regularis

Binomial name
- Anametalia regularis (Clark, 1925)

Species of sea urchin

Anametalia regularis is a species of sea urchin of the family Brissidae. Its armour is covered with spines. It belongs to the genus Anametalia and inhabits marine environments. Anametalia regularis was first scientifically described in 1925 by Hubert Clark.
