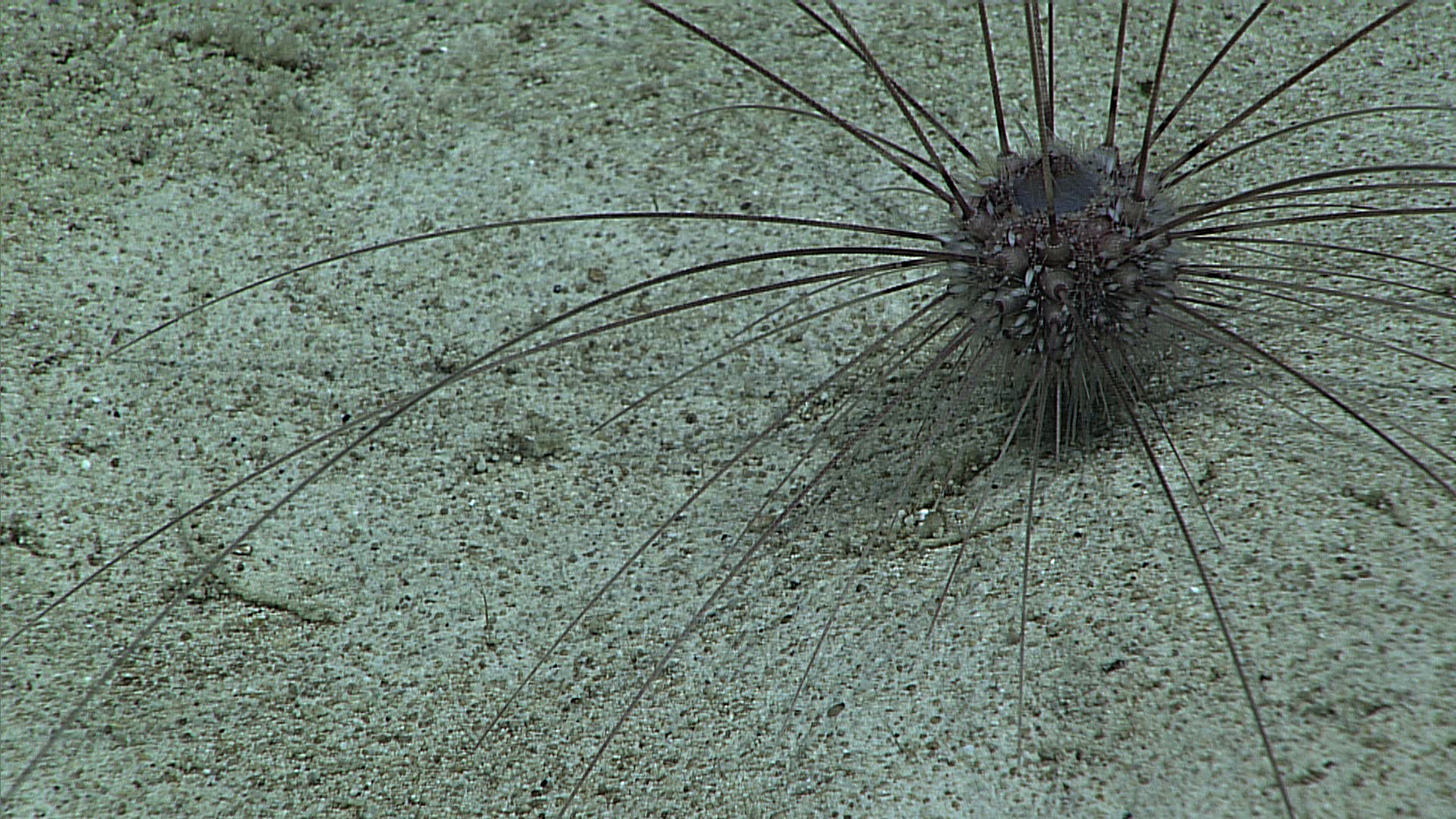
- Aspidodiadema arcitum seen off Hawaii by NOAA Okeanos Explorer mission

Scientific classification
- Domain: Eukaryota
- Kingdom: Animalia
- Phylum: Echinodermata
- Class: Echinoidea
- Order: Aspidodiadematoida
- Family: Aspidodiadematidae
- Genus: Aspidodiadema
- Species: A. arcitum

Binomial name
- Aspidodiadema arcitum (O. Mortensen, 1939)

= Aspidodiadema arcitum =

Species of sea urchin

Aspidodiadema arcitum is a species of sea urchin of the family Aspidodiadematidae. Their armour is covered with spines. It is placed in the genus Aspidodiadema and lives in the sea. Aspidodiadema arcitum was first scientifically described in 1939 by Ole Theodor Jensen Mortensen, a Danish scientist.
