= Anametalia sternaloides =

Scientific classification
- Domain: Eukaryota
- Kingdom: Animalia
- Phylum: Echinodermata
- Class: Echinoidea
- Order: Spatangoida
- Family: Brissidae
- Genus: Anametalia
- Species: A. sternaloides

Binomial name
- Anametalia sternaloides (Bolau, 1874)

Species of sea urchin

Anametalia sternaloides is a species of sea urchin of the family Brissidae. Their armour is covered with spines. It is placed in the genus Anametalia and lives in the sea. Anametalia sternaloides was first scientifically described in 1874 by Bolau.
