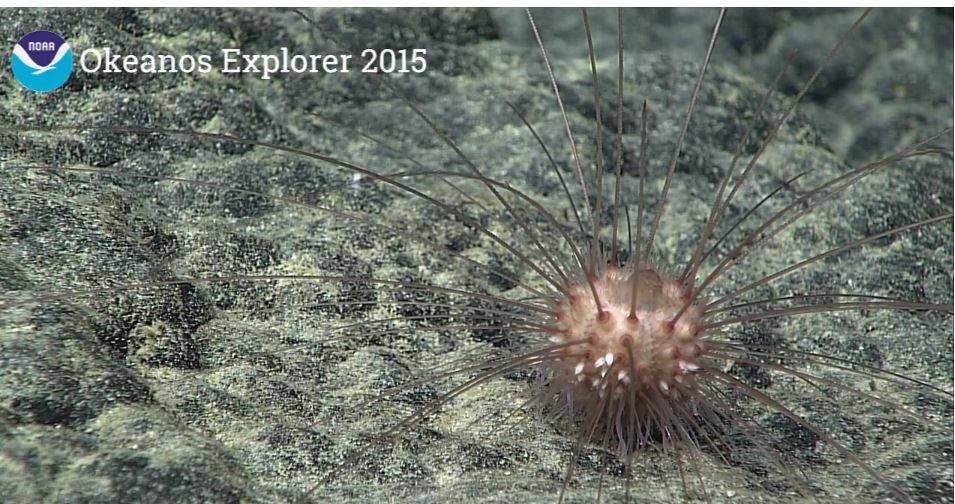
- Aspidodiadema hawaiiense observed off Hawaii by the NOAA Okeanos Explorer mission in 2015

Scientific classification
- Domain: Eukaryota
- Kingdom: Animalia
- Phylum: Echinodermata
- Class: Echinoidea
- Order: Aspidodiadematoida
- Family: Aspidodiadematidae
- Genus: Aspidodiadema
- Species: A. hawaiiense

Binomial name
- Aspidodiadema hawaiiense (O. Mortensen, 1939)

= Aspidodiadema hawaiiense =

Species of sea urchin

Aspidodiadema hawaiiense is a species of sea urchin of the family Aspidodiadematidae. Their armor is covered with spines. It is placed in the genus Aspidodiadema and lives in the sea. Aspidodiadema hawaiiense was first scientifically described in 1939 by Ole Theodor Jensen Mortensen, a Danish scientist.
