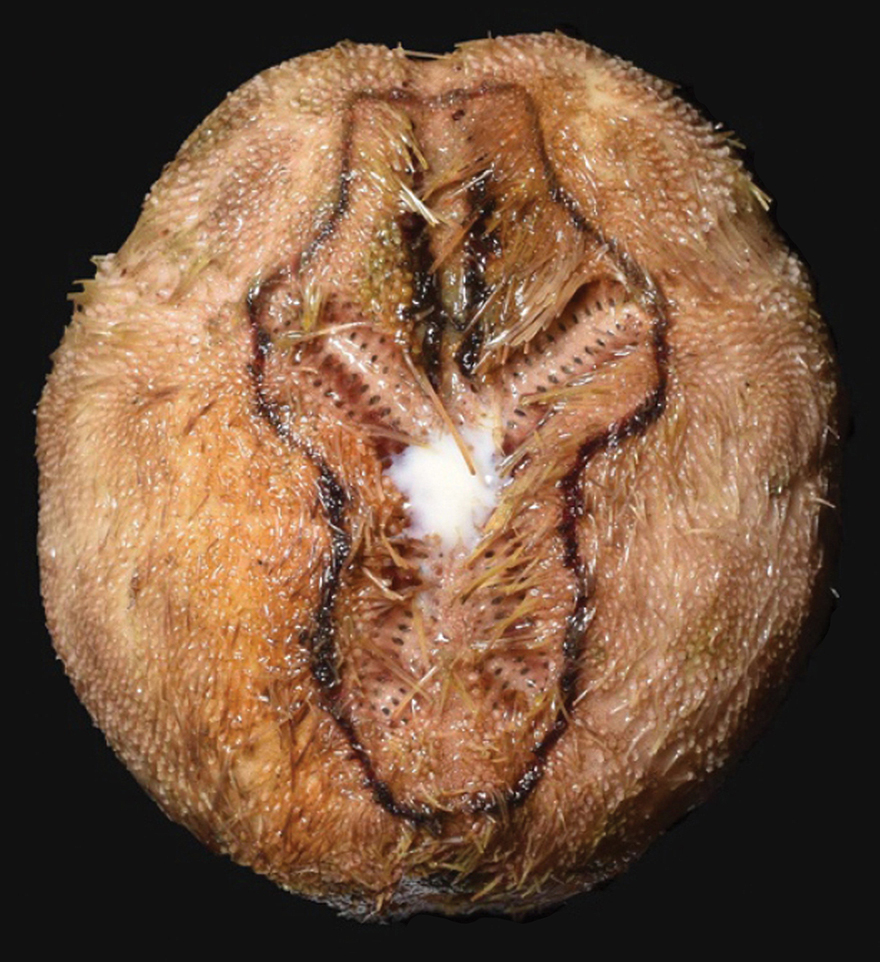

Scientific classification
- Kingdom: Animalia
- Phylum: Echinodermata
- Class: Echinoidea
- Order: Spatangoida
- Family: Brissidae
- Genus: Brissopsis
- Species: B. luzonica

Binomial name
- Brissopsis luzonica (Gray, 1851)

= Brissopsis luzonica =

Species of sea urchin

Brissopsis luzonica is a species of sea urchins of the family Brissidae. Their armour is covered with spines. Brissopsis luzonica was first scientifically described in 1851 by Gray.
