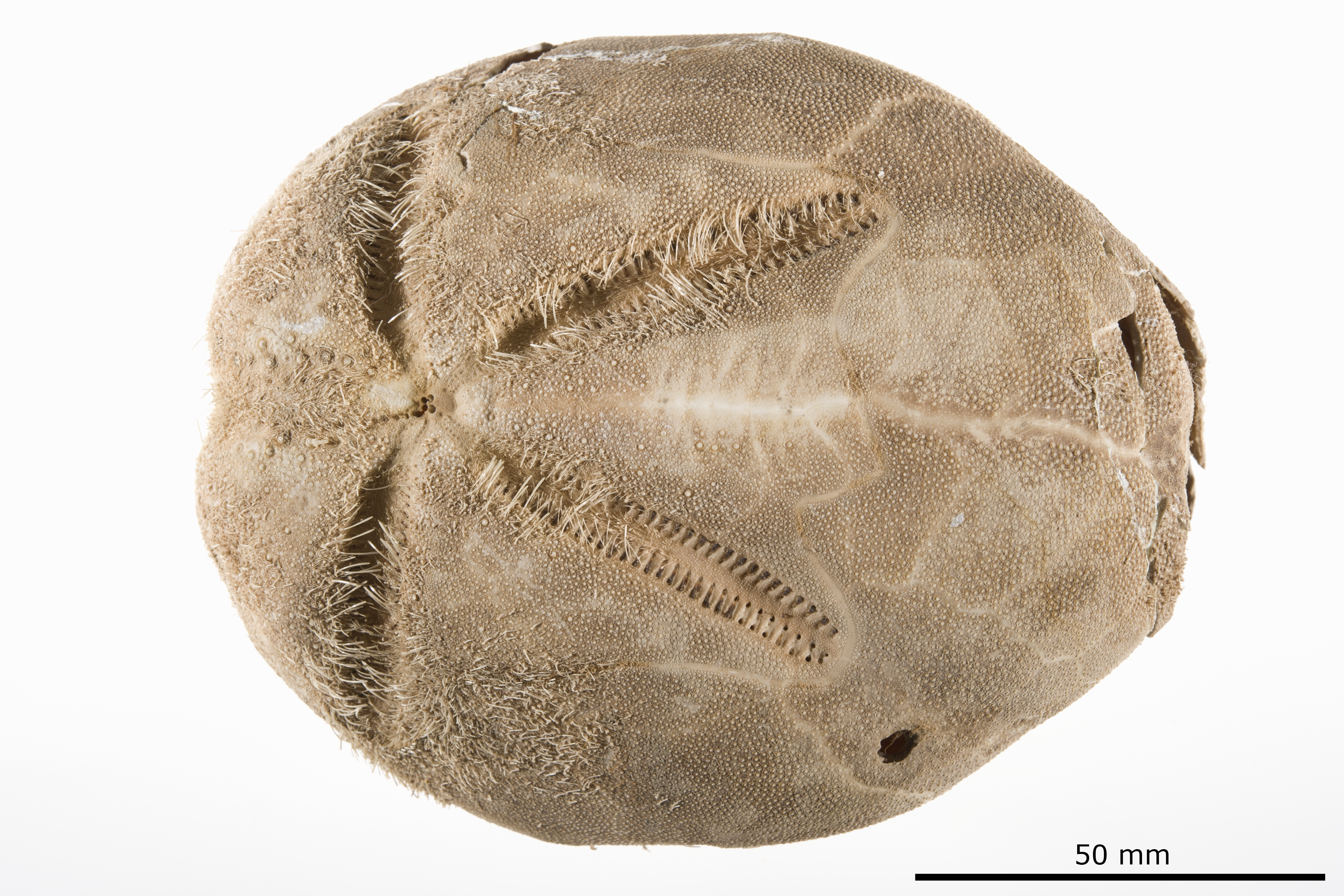
- Holotype of Anametalia grandis Mortensen, 1950

Scientific classification
- Kingdom: Animalia
- Phylum: Echinodermata
- Class: Echinoidea
- Order: Spatangoida
- Family: Brissidae
- Genus: Anametalia; Mortensen, 1950

= Anametalia =

Genus of echinoderms

Anametalia is a genus of echinoderms belonging to the family Brissidae.

The species of this genus are found in Australia.

Species:

- Anametalia grandis Mortensen, 1950
- Anametalia regularis (Clark, 1925)
- Anametalia sternaloides (Bolau, 1874)
