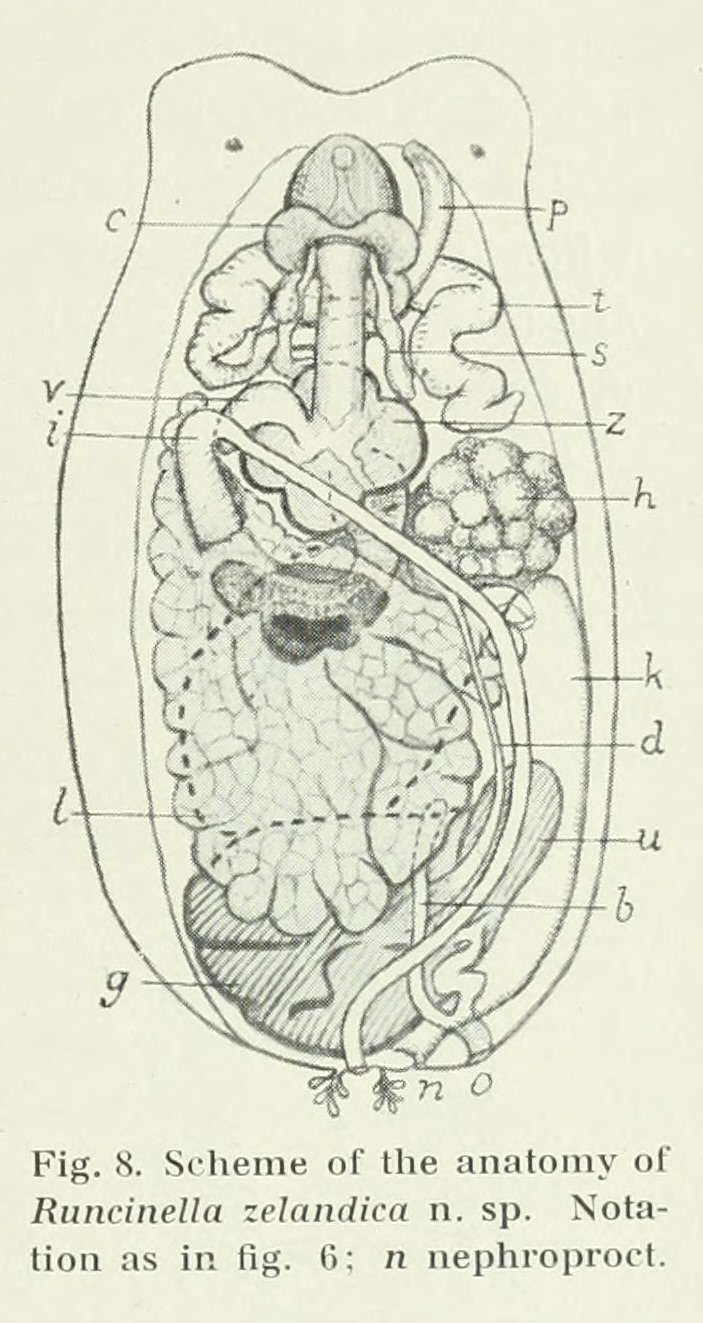

Scientific classification
- Kingdom: Animalia
- Phylum: Mollusca
- Class: Gastropoda
- Order: Runcinida
- Family: Runcinidae
- Genus: Runcinella
- Species: R. zelandica

Binomial name
- Runcinella zelandica Odhner, 1924

= Runcinella zelandica =

Species of Gastropod

Runcinella zelandica is a species of gastropod of the family Runcinidae. The type specimen was first collected at Cape Brett by Ole Theodor Jensen Mortensen during his Pacific expedition 1914—16.
