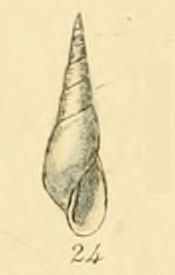
- Haliella stenostoma shell

Scientific classification
- Kingdom: Animalia
- Phylum: Mollusca
- Class: Gastropoda
- Subclass: Caenogastropoda
- Order: Littorinimorpha
- Family: Eulimidae
- Genus: Haliella
- Species: H. stenostoma

Binomial name
- Haliella stenostoma Jeffreys, 1858

Synonyms
- Eulima geographica de Folin, 1887; Eulima stenostoma Jeffreys, 1858; Maliella geographica de Folin, 1887

= Haliella stenostoma =

Species of gastropod

Haliella stenostoma is a species of sea snail, a marine gastropod mollusk in the family Eulimidae.

== Distribution ==
This species occurs in the following locations:

- European waters (ERMS scope)
- North West Atlantic
- Portuguese Exclusive Economic Zone
- Spanish Exclusive Economic Zone
- Swedish Exclusive Economic Zone
- United Kingdom Exclusive Economic Zone

== Description ==
The maximum recorded shell length is 8.5 mm.

== Habitat ==
Minimum recorded depth is 749 m. Maximum recorded depth is 2022 m.
