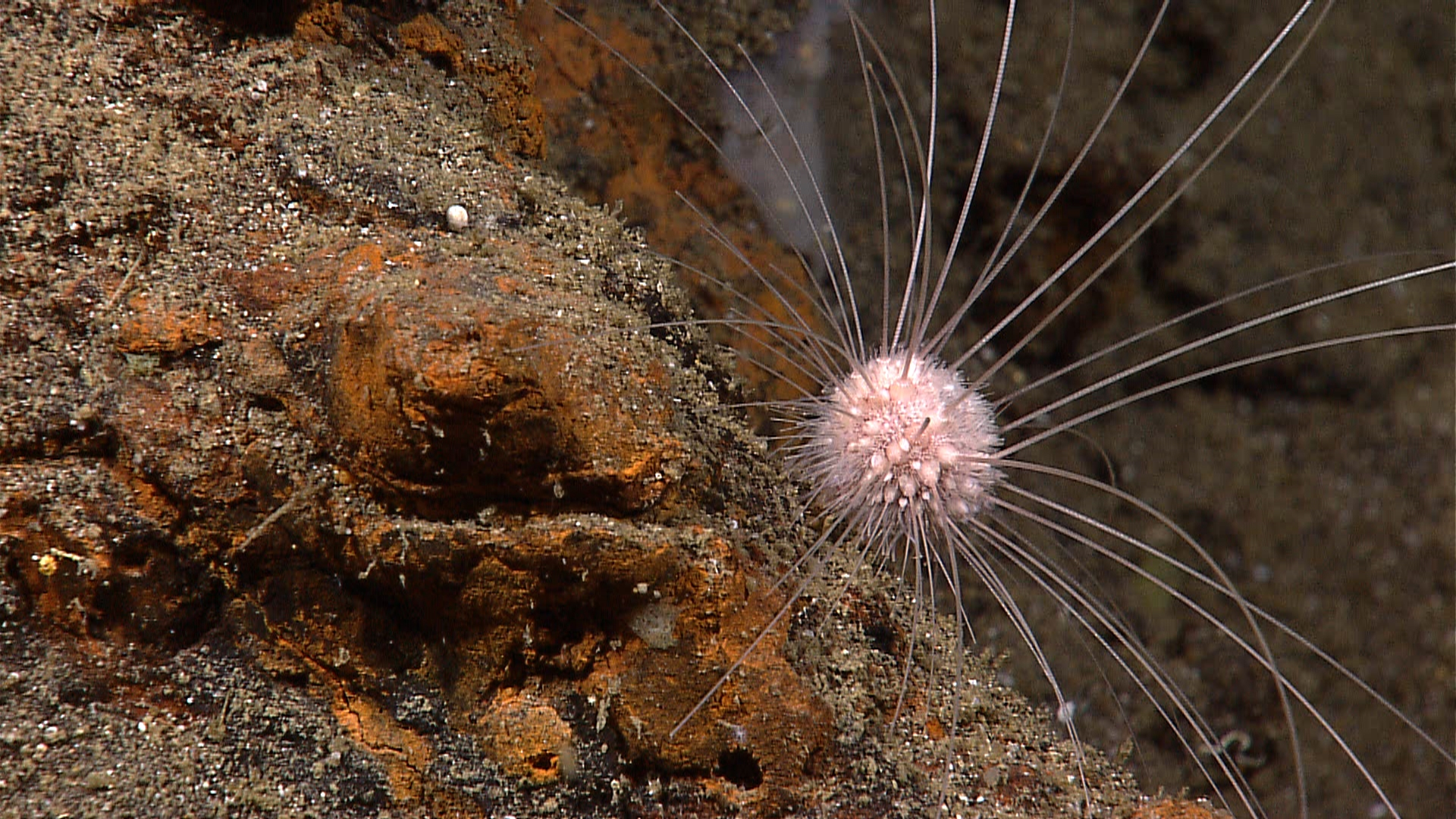

Scientific classification
- Kingdom: Animalia
- Phylum: Echinodermata
- Class: Echinoidea
- Subclass: Euechinoidea
- Infraclass: Acroechinoidea
- Order: Aspidodiadematoida
- Family: Aspidodiadematidae

Genera
- Aspidodiadema; Culozoma †; Eosalenia †; Gymnotiara †; Plesiodiadema

= Aspidodiadematidae =

Family of sea urchins

The Aspidodiadematidae are a family of sea urchins.

== Characteristics ==
All the members of the two extant genera, Aspidodiadema and Plesiodiadema, are found in tropical seas at bathyal and abyssal depths, often on the submarine slopes of islands. The genera Culozoma, Eosalenia, and Gymnotiara are known only from the fossil record. Study of the larval development of Aspidodiadema jacobyi suggests that the family should be elevated to ordinal status as a sister clade of the order Diadematoida, or possibly be regarded as a sister clade of the other families within that order.

== Genera ==
These genera and species are listed in the World Register of Marine Species:

Genus	Author Genus	Species	Author Species	Age
Aspidodiadema	Agassiz, 1878	Aspidodiadema africanum	Mortensen, 1939	Extant
Aspidodiadema	Agassiz, 1878	Aspidodiadema annulatum	Koehler, 1927	Extant
Aspidodiadema	Agassiz, 1878	Aspidodiadema arcitum	Mortensen, 1939	Extant
Aspidodiadema	Agassiz, 1878	Aspidodiadema hawaiiense	Mortensen, 1939	Extant
Aspidodiadema	Agassiz, 1878	Aspidodiadema intermedium	Shigei, 1977	Extant
Aspidodiadema	Agassiz, 1878	Aspidodiadema jacobi	Agassiz, 1880	Extant
Aspidodiadema	Agassiz, 1878	Aspidodiadema meijerei	Doderlein, 1906	Extant
Aspidodiadema	Agassiz, 1878	Aspidodiadema montanum	Mironov, 1981	Extant
Aspidodiadema	Agassiz, 1878	Aspidodiadema nicobaricum	Doderlein, 1901	Extant
Aspidodiadema	Agassiz, 1878	Aspidodiadema sinuosum	Mironov, 1981	Extant
Aspidodiadema	Agassiz, 1878	Aspidodiadema tonsum	Agassiz, 1878	Extant
Culozoma	Vadet & Slowik, 2001			†
Eosalenia	Lambert in Lambert & Savin, 1905	Eosalenia jessoni	Gregory, 1896	Bajocian; Oxfordian
Eosalenia	Lambert in Lambert & Savin, 1905	Eosalenia miranda	Lambert in Lambert & Savin, 1905	Bajocian
Gymnotiara	Pomel, 1883			†
Plesiodiadema	Pomel, 1883	Plesiodiadema amphigymnum	(de Meijere, 1902)	Extant
Plesiodiadema	Pomel, 1883	Plesiodiadema antillarum	(A. Agassiz, 1880)	Extant
Plesiodiadema	Pomel, 1883	Plesiodiadema globulosum	Agassiz, 1879	Extant
Plesiodiadema	Pomel, 1883	Plesiodiadema horridum	(A. Agassiz, 1898)	Extant
Plesiodiadema	Pomel, 1883	Plesiodiadema indicum	(Doderlein, 1900)	Extant
Plesiodiadema	Pomel, 1883	Plesiodiadema microtuberculatum	Agassiz, 1879	Extant
Plesiodiadema	Pomel, 1883	Plesiodiadema molle	(Döderlein, 1901)	Extant
