= Haliella chilensis =

- Shell of Haliella chilensis (syntype at the Smithsonian Institution)

Scientific classification
- Kingdom: Animalia
- Phylum: Mollusca
- Class: Gastropoda
- Subclass: Caenogastropoda
- Order: Littorinimorpha
- Family: Eulimidae
- Genus: Haliella
- Species: H. chilensis

Binomial name
- Haliella chilensis Bartsch, 1917

Species of gastropod

Haliella chilensis is a species of sea snail, a marine gastropod mollusk in the family Eulimidae.

== Description ==
The length of the shell attains 5.5 mm, its diameter 1.3 mm.

(Original description) The elongate-conic shell is slender. It is semitranslucent to bluish-white, with a polished surface marked only by exceedingly fine lines of growth. The nine whorls are almost flattened and are separated by a scarcely defined suture. The periphery of the body whorl is well rounded, and the base is moderately long and well rounded. The aperture is ovate, with an acute posterior angle. The outer lip is moderately protracted between the posterior angle and the base. The inner lip is slender and curved, becoming partly reflected over and appressed to the base posteriorly. The parietal wall is covered by a thin callus.

== Distribution ==
This species occurs in the Pacific Ocean off Chile.
