= Brissalius =

Scientific classification
- Kingdom: Animalia
- Phylum: Echinodermata
- Class: Echinoidea
- Order: Spatangoida
- Family: Brissidae
- Genus: Brissalius; Coppard, 2008
- Species: B. vannoordenburgi

Binomial name
- Brissalius vannoordenburgi Coppard, 2008

Species of sea urchin

Brissalius vannoordenburgi is a species of sea urchin in the family Brissidae. It is the only species in the genus Brissalius.Their armour is covered with spines. Brissalius vannoordenburgi was first scientifically described in 2008 by Coppard.
