= Mortensen's Pacific expedition 1914–1916 =

Research expedition to the Pacific including New Zealand by Theodor Mortensen

- Location: New Zealand; Auckland Islands; Campbell Islands; Pacific Ocean
- Country of origin: Denmark
- Start: 1914
- End: 1916
- Funder: Government of Denmark
- Vessels: HMS Sparrow; NZGSS Hinemoa
- Participants: Ole Theodor Jensen Mortensen

The Mortensen's Pacific expedition 1914–1916 was a research expedition undertaken by Ole Theodor Jensen Mortensen between 1914 and 1916 to research the biodiversity of the Pacific Ocean. During this expedition Mortensen visited New Zealand from November 1915 to February 1916 and undertook collecting trips and further research into marine biodiversity.

== Expedition goals ==
The expedition was funded by the Danish Government. Mortensen had previously participated in the Swedish Arctic expedition of 1901, and saw this expedition as an opportunity to identify links with previous findings regarding South America.

== Notable events ==
The type specimen of Runcinella zelandica was collected by Mortensen during this expedition.
