= Aspidodiadema montanum =

Scientific classification
- Domain: Eukaryota
- Kingdom: Animalia
- Phylum: Echinodermata
- Class: Echinoidea
- Order: Aspidodiadematoida
- Family: Aspidodiadematidae
- Genus: Aspidodiadema
- Species: A. montanum

Binomial name
- Aspidodiadema montanum (Mironov, 1981)

Species of sea urchin

Aspidodiadema montanum is a species of sea urchin of the family Aspidodiadematidae. Their armour is covered with spines. It is placed in the genus Aspidodiadema and lives in the sea. Aspidodiadema montanum was first scientifically described in 1981 by Mironov.

== See also ==
- Aspidodiadema jacobyi
- Aspidodiadema meijerei
- Aspidodiadema nicobaricum
