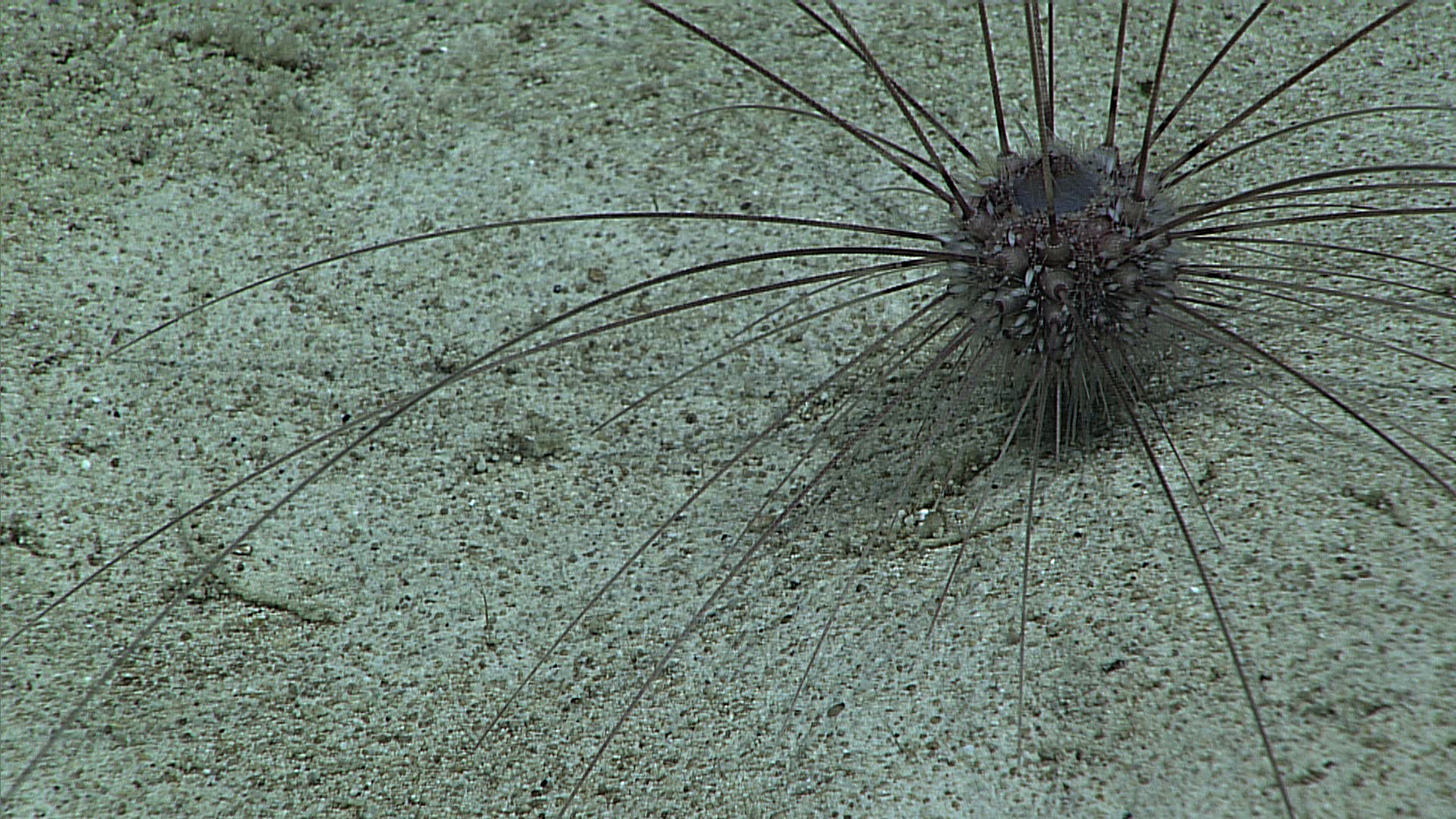
- Aspidodiadema arcitum

Scientific classification
- Kingdom: Animalia
- Phylum: Echinodermata
- Class: Echinoidea
- Order: Aspidodiadematoida
- Family: Aspidodiadematidae
- Genus: Aspidodiadema; Agassiz, 1879

Type species
- Aspidodiadema tonsum Agassiz, 1878

Species
- See text.

= Aspidodiadema =

Genus of sea urchins

Aspidodiadema is a genus of echinoderms belonging to the family Aspidodiadematidae. The species of this genus are found in the Indo-Pacific and Caribbean.

== Description ==
The test is small and subglobular with fragile plating which is firmly tessellated. The apical disc is monocyclic. The plates membrane is embedded and does not touch the coronal plates.

The ambulacral plating is pseudocompound with single large primary tubercle on every third plate which is much enlarged compared to the others. The primary tubercles form an alternate series down the perradius. These traits distinguish this genus from Plesiodiadema and Gymnotiara. The primary tubercles are perforated and notched. The secondary tuberculation confined to plate margins. The peristome has shallow, rounded buccal notches.

The spines are slender and arranged in whorls. The lumens are filled with a mesh of horizontal dividers and vertical pillars.

== Species ==
The following species are recognised:

- Aspidodiadema africanum Mortensen, 1939
- Aspidodiadema annulatum Koehler, 1927
- Aspidodiadema arcitum Mortensen, 1939
- Aspidodiadema hawaiiense Mortensen, 1939
- Aspidodiadema intermedium Shigei, 1977
- Aspidodiadema jacobyi Agassiz, 1880
- Aspidodiadema meijerei Döderlein, 1906
- Aspidodiadema montanum Mironov, 1981
- Aspidodiadema multituberculatum Agassiz, 1879
- Aspidodiadema nicobaricum Döderlein, 1901
- Aspidodiadema sinuosum Mironov, 1981
- Aspidodiadema tonsum Agassiz, 1879
