= Cionobrissus =

Scientific classification
- Kingdom: Animalia
- Phylum: Echinodermata
- Class: Echinoidea
- Order: Spatangoida
- Family: Brissidae
- Genus: Cionobrissus; A. Agassiz, 1879
- Species: C. revinctus

Binomial name
- Cionobrissus revinctus A. Agassiz, 1879

Species of sea urchin

Cionobrissus revinctus is a species of sea urchin of the family Brissidae. It is the only species in the genus Cionobrissus. Their armour is covered with spines. Cionobrissus revinctus was first scientifically described in 1879 by Alexander Emanuel Agassiz.
