= Haliella abyssicola =

- Shell of Haliella abyssicola

Scientific classification
- Kingdom: Animalia
- Phylum: Mollusca
- Class: Gastropoda
- Subclass: Caenogastropoda
- Order: Littorinimorpha
- Family: Eulimidae
- Genus: Haliella
- Species: H. abyssicola

Binomial name
- Haliella abyssicola Bartsch, 1917

Species of gastropod

Haliella abyssicola is a species of sea snail, a marine gastropod mollusk in the family Eulimidae.

== Description ==
The length of the shell attains 10.4 mm, its diameter 2.9 mm.

(Original description) The elongate-conic shell is straight, semitransparent, polished. it is bluish-white, marked by scarcely perceptible lines of growth. The shell contains 10 whorls. The whorls are slightly rounded and rather high between the sutures; the appressed portion of the summit appears as a narrow white band, the posterior limit of which, forming the suture, is scarcely perceptible since it practically fuses with the preceding whorl. The periphery of the body whorl is well rounded. The base is moderately long and well rounded. The aperture is very large and ear-shaped; the posterior angle is acute; the outer lip is very thin, becoming gradually protracted from the posterior angle to the periphery, then more rapidly retractive toward the base, with the basal portion of the outer lip forming a broad, rounded channel; the inner lip is long, decidedly sigmoid, slightly reflected, and partly appressed to the base, provided with a twist a little anterior to its insertion; and the parietal wall is covered with a thin callus.

== Distribution ==
This species occurs in the Pacific Ocean off Southern California and off Mexico.
