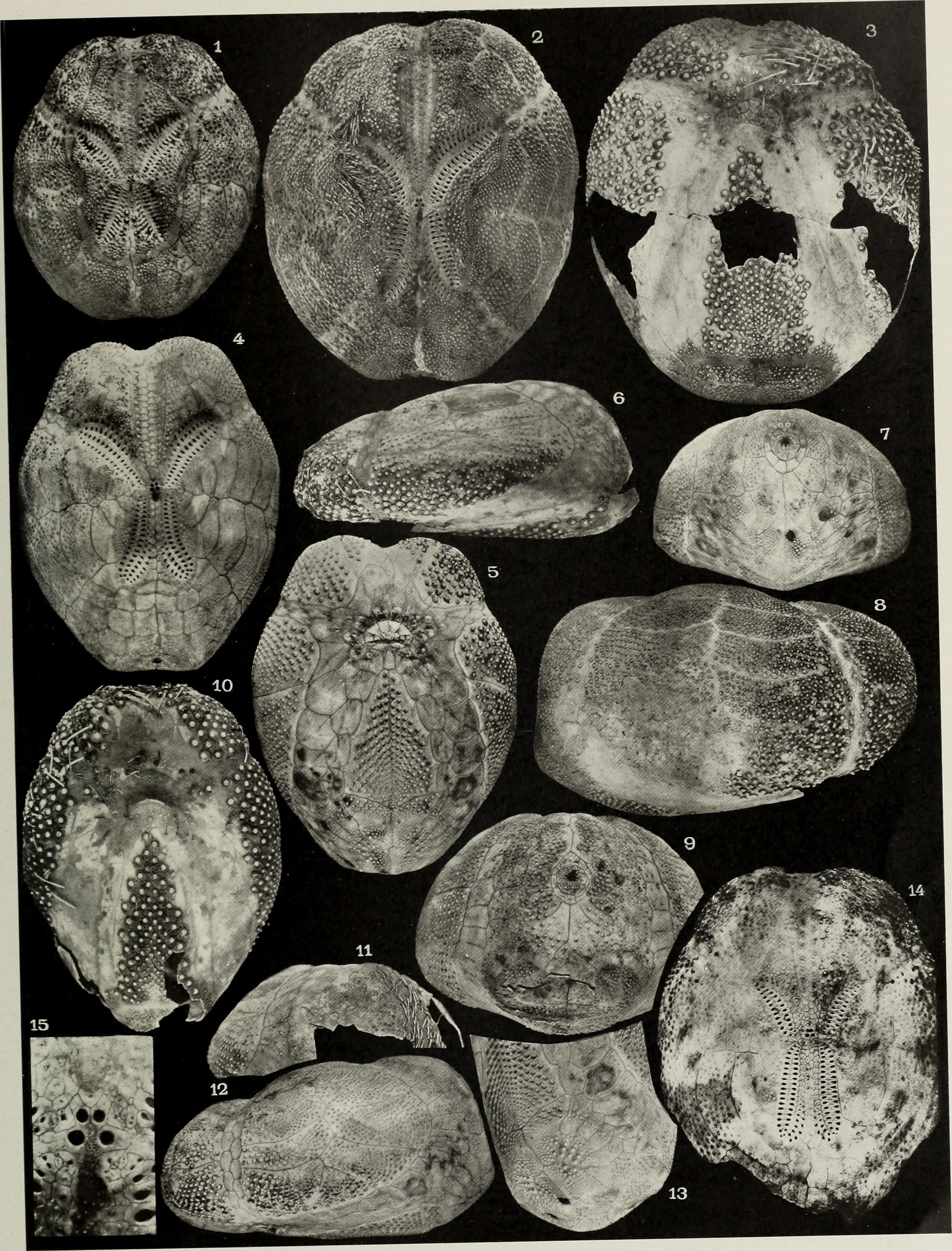
- Pictures of Brissopsis parallela at Fig 10&11

Scientific classification
- Kingdom: Animalia
- Phylum: Echinodermata
- Class: Echinoidea
- Order: Spatangoida
- Family: Brissidae
- Genus: Brissopsis
- Species: B. parallela

Binomial name
- Brissopsis parallela Koehler, 1914

= Brissopsis parallela =

Species of sea urchin

Brissopsis parallela is a species of sea urchins of the family Brissidae. Their armour is covered with spines. Brissopsis parallela was first scientifically described in 1914 by Koehler.
