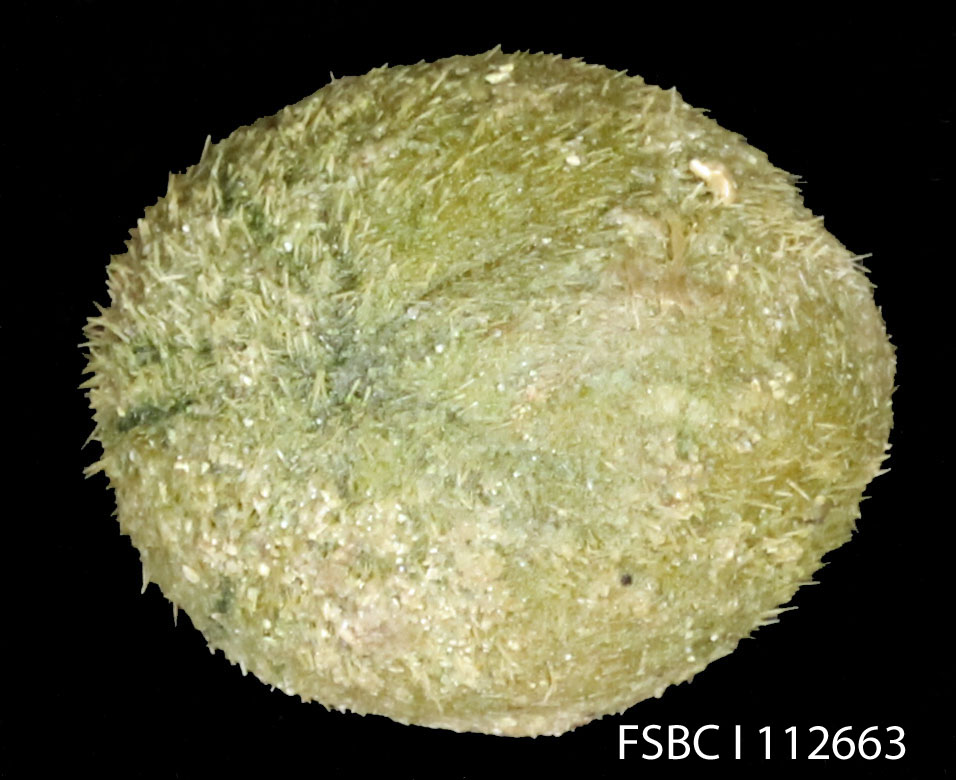
- Brissopsis alta

Scientific classification
- Kingdom: Animalia
- Phylum: Echinodermata
- Class: Echinoidea
- Order: Spatangoida
- Family: Brissidae
- Genus: Brissopsis; L. Agassiz, 1840

= Brissopsis =

Genus of echinoderms

Brissopsis is a genus of echinoderms belonging to the family Brissidae.

The genus has almost cosmopolitan distribution.

Species:

- Brissopsis alta Mortensen, 1907
- Brissopsis atlantica Mortensen, 1907
- Brissopsis bengalensis Koehler, 1914
- Brissopsis caparti Cherbonnier, 1959
- Brissopsis columbaris A. Agassiz, 1898
- Brissopsis elongata Mortensen, 1907
- Brissopsis evanescens Mortensen, 1950
- Brissopsis jarlii Mortensen, 1951
- Brissopsis luzonica (Gray, 1851)
- Brissopsis lyrifera (Forbes, 1841)
- Brissopsis micropetala Mortensen, 1948
- Brissopsis obliqua Mortensen, 1948
- Brissopsis oldhami Alcock, 1893
- Brissopsis pacifica (A. Agassiz, 1898)
- Brissopsis parallela Koehler, 1914
- Brissopsis similis Mortensen, 1948
- Brissopsis zealandiae Mortensen, 1921
