= Aspidodiadema intermedium =

Scientific classification
- Domain: Eukaryota
- Kingdom: Animalia
- Phylum: Echinodermata
- Class: Echinoidea
- Order: Aspidodiadematoida
- Family: Aspidodiadematidae
- Genus: Aspidodiadema
- Species: A. intermedium

Binomial name
- Aspidodiadema intermedium Shigei, 1977

Species of sea urchin

Aspidodiadema intermedium is a species of sea urchin of the family Aspidodiadematidae. Their armour is covered with spines. It is placed in the genus Aspidodiadema and lives in the sea. Aspidodiadema intermedium was first scientifically described in 1977 by Shigei.
