= Aspidodiadema tonsum =

Scientific classification
- Kingdom: Animalia
- Phylum: Echinodermata
- Class: Echinoidea
- Order: Aspidodiadematoida
- Family: Aspidodiadematidae
- Genus: Aspidodiadema
- Species: A. tonsum

Binomial name
- Aspidodiadema tonsum (A. Agassiz, 1879)

Species of sea urchin

Aspidodiadema tonsum is a species of sea urchin of the family Aspidodiadematidae. Their armour is covered with spines. It is placed in the genus Aspidodiadema and lives in the sea. Aspidodiadema tonsum was first scientifically described in 1879 by Alexander Emanuel Agassiz.
