= Aspidodiadema annulatum =

Scientific classification
- Kingdom: Animalia
- Phylum: Echinodermata
- Class: Echinoidea
- Order: Aspidodiadematoida
- Family: Aspidodiadematidae
- Genus: Aspidodiadema
- Species: A. annulatum

Binomial name
- Aspidodiadema annulatum (Koehler, 1927)

Species of sea urchin

Aspidodiadema annulatum is a species of sea urchin of the family Aspidodiadematidae. Their armour is covered with spines. It is placed in the genus Aspidodiadema and lives in the sea. Aspidodiadema annulatum was first scientifically described in 1927 by Koehler.
