= Aspidodiadema jacobyi =

Scientific classification
- Kingdom: Animalia
- Phylum: Echinodermata
- Class: Echinoidea
- Order: Aspidodiadematoida
- Family: Aspidodiadematidae
- Genus: Aspidodiadema
- Species: A. jacobyi

Binomial name
- Aspidodiadema jacobyi A. Agassiz, 1880

Species of sea urchin

Aspidodiadema jacobyi is a small sea urchin in the family Aspidodiadematidae. It lives in tropical seas at great depths. Aspidodiadema jacobyi was first scientifically described in 1880 by Alexander Emanuel Agassiz, an American scientist.

== Description ==
Aspidodiadema jacobyi has a globular hard test or shell protecting the inner organs. The mouth has 10 buccal plates and small rounded buccal notches and is on the oral (bottom) surface which is slightly flattened. The aboral (top) surface has a small coronal ring of tubercles surrounding the anus. The test is composed of 5 radial ambulacral sets of 3 plates, separated by 5 ambulacral grooves. There are rows of pairs of pores between the ambulacral areas through which the tube feet protrude. Every third row of plates is larger than the other 2 and has a zig-zag row of large primary tubercles. This row does not extend quite as far as the other 2 rows of plates which have similar primary tubercles set serially in a straight line. These large tubercles are perforate and crenulate. There are smaller, secondary tubercles at the edge of the plates. Slender, flexible spines articulate with all these tubercles. These spines are hollow and have bridging structures across their lumina with minute needle-like pillars. The test has green tubercles with purple interambulacral areas.

== Distribution ==
Aspidodiadema jacobyi is found in the bathyal zone at depths of over 1,000 metres (3,300 ft) in the Caribbean Sea and Gulf of Mexico. Its range extends from the Bahamas and West Indies to Colombia, Nicaragua and Mexico.

== Biology ==
Little was known about the reproductive biology of deep-water sea urchins, therefore a study was undertaken using Aspidodiadema jacobyi as a model. This species is dioecious with individuals being either male or female. Mature individuals were gathered during the spring on a number of occasions spanning several years. They were collected in the Bahamas by suction at depths of 500 to 750 metres (1,640 to 2,460 ft) and were kept in containers in the laboratory. Attempts were made to initiate spawning but these were successful on only two occasions. The eggs measured 94–100μm and had a yolk so that newly hatched larvae do not need to feed at first. It was suggested that in the open sea this would allow the larvae to disperse in ocean currents, surviving in cold waters where little food is available. Alternatively, another study found that the eggs are surrounded by mucus through which the sperm, which have unusually elongated heads, must penetrate. The eggs clump together and may adhere in a viscous mass to the adult's spines and be brooded there. The sperm also form a mucous mass, and it may be that a form of pseudo-copulation takes place with the pressing together of the gamete masses of adjacent individuals. In the laboratory, embryos developed over a period of 5 months into echinopluteus larvae measuring over 3000μm which were fed on unicellular algae. During their early stages the larvae developed 2 and then 4 larval arms before the mouth developed at about 11 days. Three further pairs of long arms developed over the next 30 days, after which a posterior process and a ciliated ring appeared successively. At 75 days a rudimentary echinus appeared and at 116 days, podia were apparent. None of the larvae completed metamorphosis into a juvenile and it was suggested that this may have been because the process needed to be initiated by chemical stimuli that were absent in this in vitro experiment.
