= Ole Theodor Jensen Mortensen =

Danish scientist and professor

Ole Theodor Jensen Mortensen, also known as Theodor Mortensen (22 February 1868, Harløse, Hillerød – 3 April 1952) was a Danish scientist and professor at the Zoological Museum, Copenhagen. He specialized in sea urchins (Echinoidea) and provided an enormous marine collection to the museum. He collected many sea urchin species on his expeditions between 1899–1930. Between the years of 1914 to 1916 Mortensen undertook a research expedition to the Pacific.

Mortensen is the author of A Monograph of the echinoidea and Report on the echinoidea collected by the United States fisheries steamer "Albatross" during the Philippine expedition, 1907–1910.

Frog Sylvirana mortenseni, also known as Mortensen's frog, is named in his honour.
