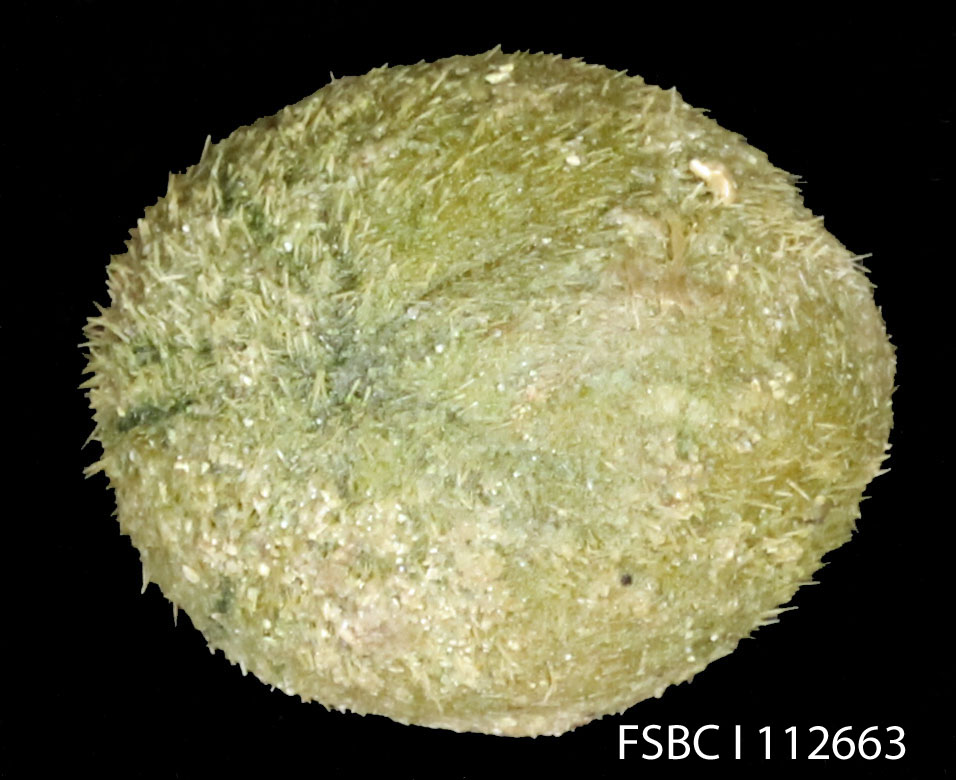

Scientific classification
- Kingdom: Animalia
- Phylum: Echinodermata
- Class: Echinoidea
- Order: Spatangoida
- Suborder: Brissidina
- Family: Brissidae; Gray, 1855

= Brissidae =

Family of echinoderms

Brissidae is a family of echinoderms belonging to the order Spatangoida.

== Genera ==
Genera:

- Anabrissus Mortensen, 1950
- Anametalia Mortensen, 1950
- Brissalius Coppard, 2008
- Brissopsis L. Agassiz, 1840
- Brissus Gray, 1825
- Cionobrissus A. Agassiz, 1879
