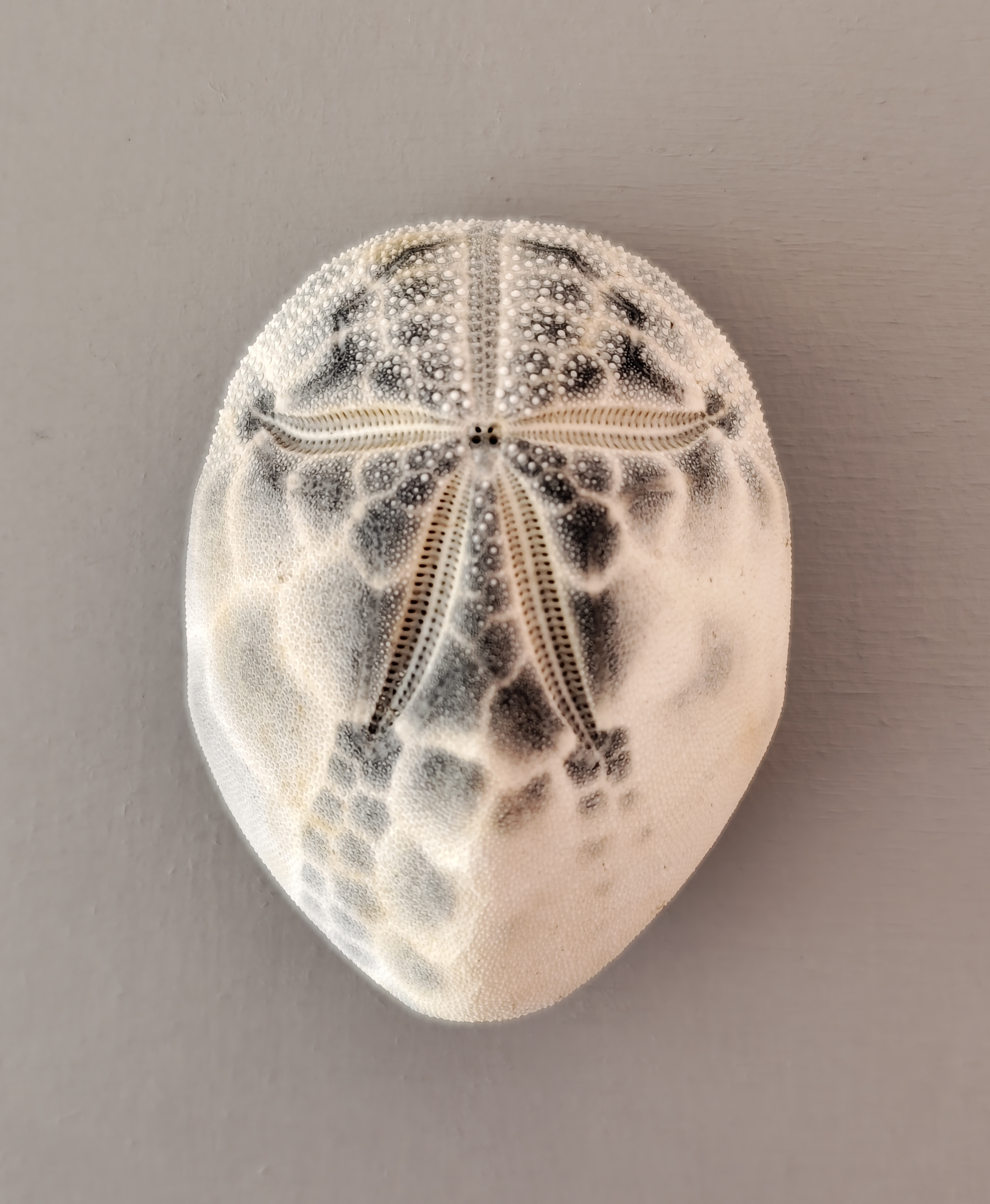
- Brissus unicolor test from Antiparos, Greece

Scientific classification
- Kingdom: Animalia
- Phylum: Echinodermata
- Class: Echinoidea
- Order: Spatangoida
- Family: Brissidae
- Genus: Brissus
- Species: B. unicolor

Binomial name
- Brissus unicolor (Leske, 1778)

= Brissus unicolor =

Species of sea urchin

Brissus unicolor is a species of sea urchins of the family Brissidae. Their armour is covered with spines. Brissus unicolor was first scientifically described in 1778 by Nathanael Gottfried Leske.

== Habitat ==
The urchin buries itself in the coarse sand at depths of 6 to 250 meters (which is why it is rarely observed alive). In the Mediterranean Sea they can be sometimes found living buried in the sediment near the tapeweed, Posidonia oceanica.

== Description ==
When alive, the urchin's whole body is covered in brown spines. After the urchin dies, its shell (also called a "test") has a distinctive pattern that consists of many grey spots. These spots are present on the urchin's test temporarily, disappearing after some time, leaving the urchin a white or a pale brown color.

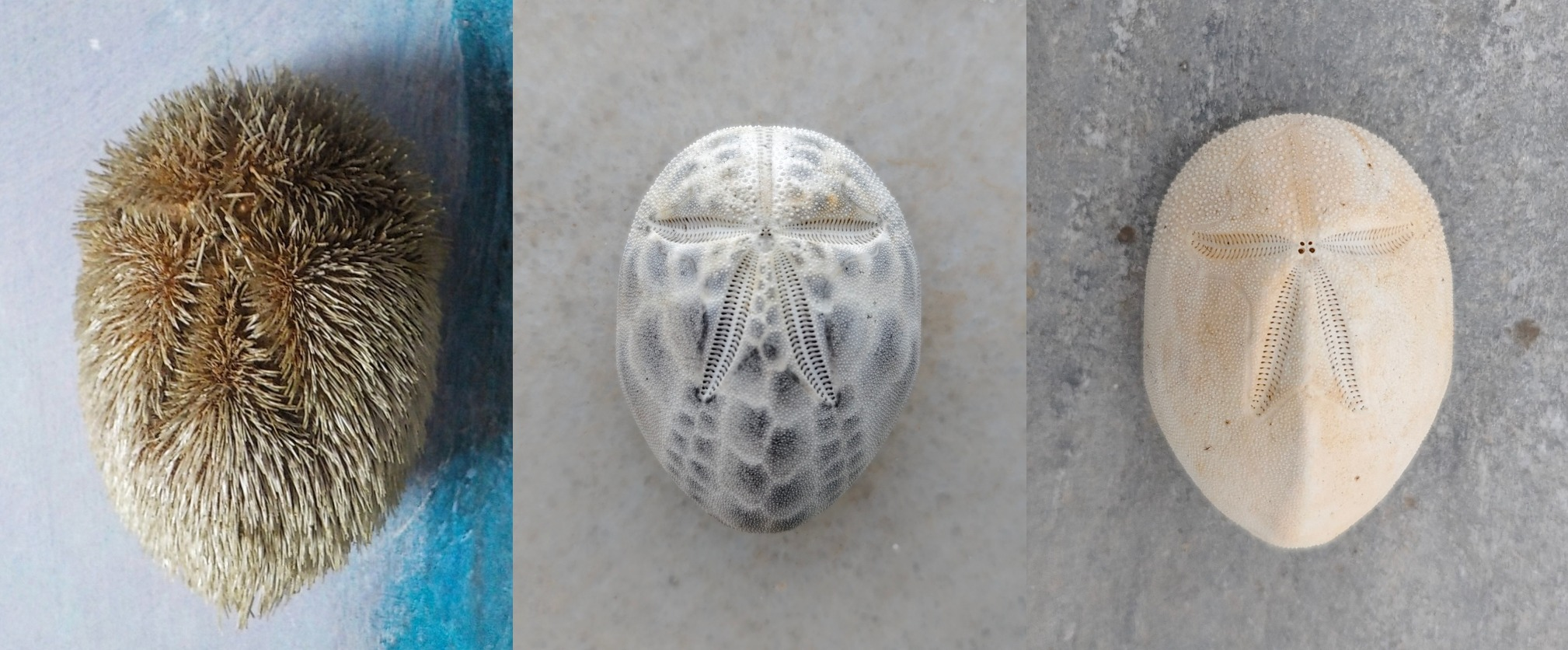
From left to right: urchin test with spines, urchin test with pattern, urchin test without pattern.

The urchin's test becomes thicker as the urchin matures. The test can reach a length of about 14 cm.

== Distribution ==
This species lives in the Mediterranean Sea and some parts of the Atlantic Ocean.
