= Sea urchins of the Gulf of California =

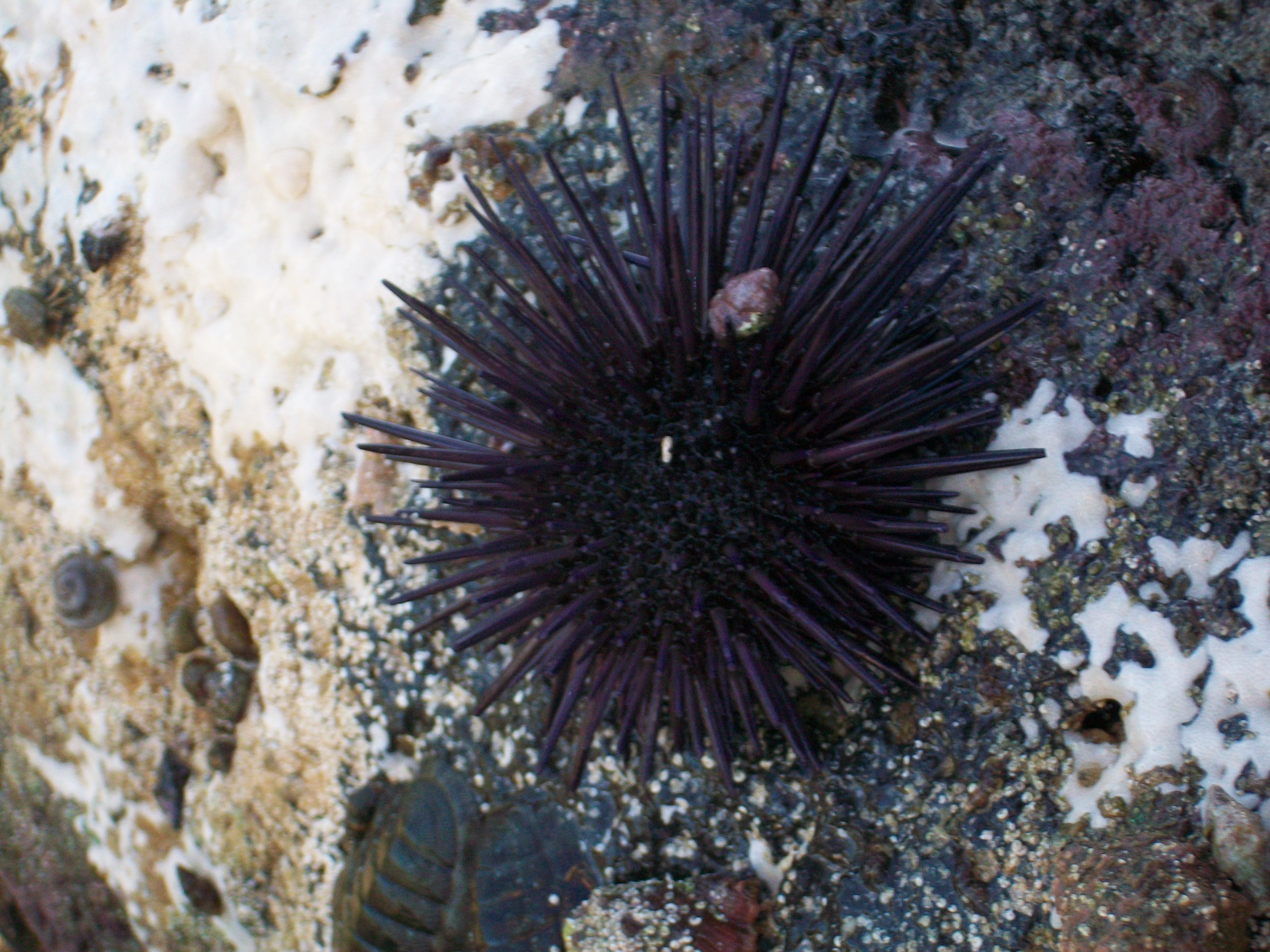
Echinometra vanbrunti, at low tide in Puerto Peñasco, Sonora, Mexico

The sea urchins of the Gulf of California live between the coasts of the Baja California Peninsula to the west and mainland state of Sonora, Mexico to the east. The northern boundary is the lateral band of land with the remains of the Colorado River Delta, and the southern is the Pacific Ocean.

The Gulf of California is known for its high diversity and endemism of biota. One type of marine animal that can be found in this region is the sea urchin (class echinoidea, in the phylum echinodermata). One echinoid, Mellita granti, is a sea urchin endemic to the Gulf of California.

== Introduction ==
Approximately 23 species of sea urchins, 3 species of heart urchins, and 9 species of sand dollars call the Gulf of California habitat their home. Where they are found throughout the Gulf of California, can be classified into three biogeographic regions called the Northern Gulf, Central Gulf, and Southern Gulf.

Two other regions are also used to classify sea urchins and other marine animals, and are called the Southwest Baja California Sur Region and the Colorado River Delta Biosphere Reserve.

== The biogeographic regions of the Gulf of California ==
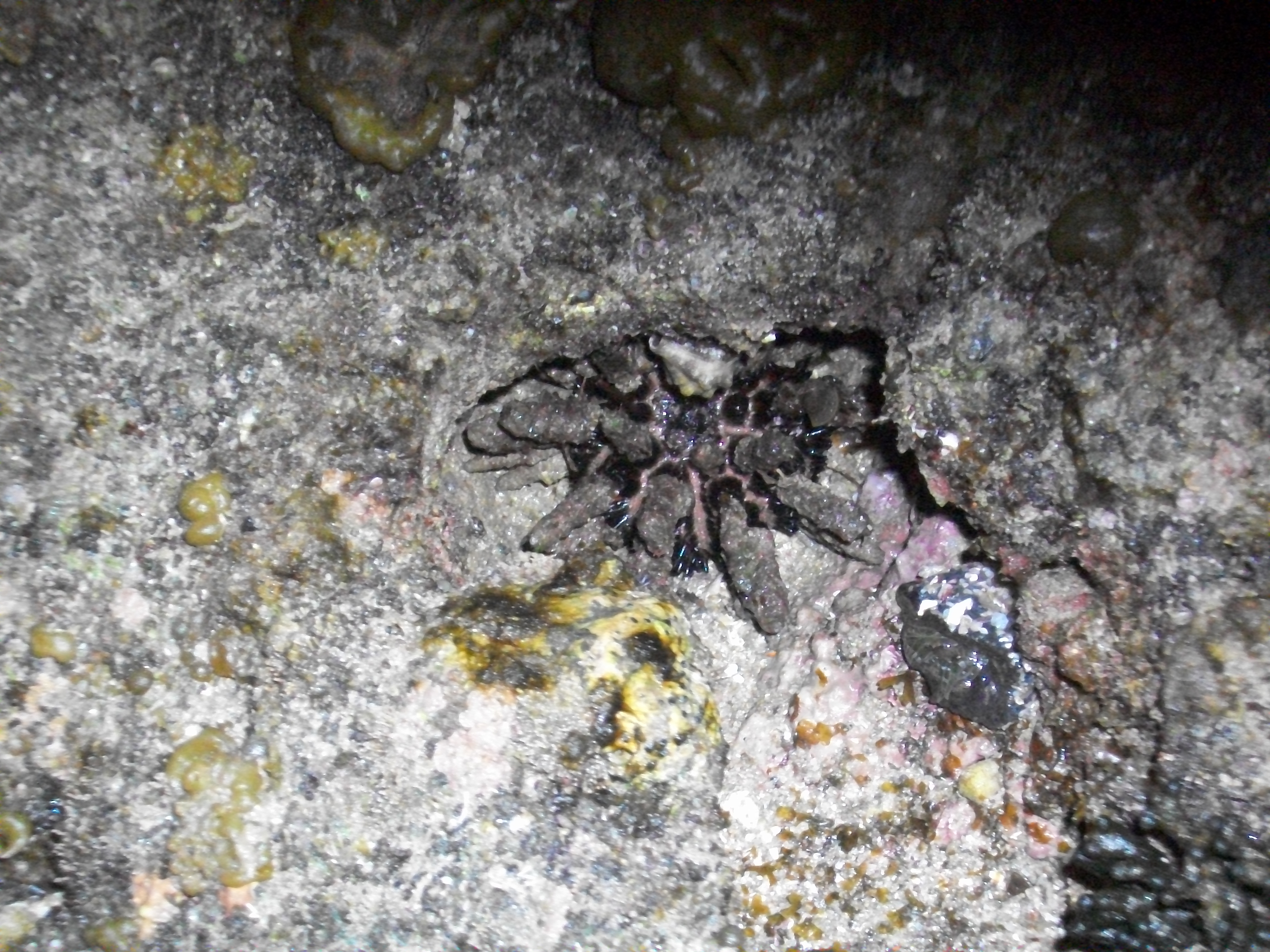
Eucidaris thouarsii among the rocks in Puerto Peñasco, Mexico

- Northern Gulf (GNC) – extends from the Colorado River Delta south to Baja California and Sonora, and includes the Midriff Islands (Tiburón Island - Isla Ángel de la Guarda).
- Central Gulf (GCC) – extends from the GNC’s southern border (the Midriff Islands) to Sonora and Baja California Sur (Punta Coyote).
- Southern Gulf (GCS) – extends from the southern border of GCC to Cabo Coririanteds in Jalisco to Cabo San Lucas on the Baja California Peninsula in Baja California Sur.
- Southwest Baja California Sur Region (SBC) – extends along the western coast of Baja California from Cabo Talso to Bahia Magdelena lagoon.

=== Biosphere Reserve ===
- Upper Gulf of California and Colorado River Delta Biosphere Reserve (RB) – includes the head of the Sea of Cortez with a southern limit between Punta San Felipe (Punta Macharro) and Punta Pelicano (Roca del Toro).

== World distribution acronyms ==
World Distribution Acronyms are used by marine biologists to designate major habitat locations.

=== Acronyms used in chart ===
- PET: Tropical Eastern Pacific; includes the whole Gulf of California; and the island groups of Lobos de Afuera and Lobos de Tierra; extends from the northern limit of the Bahía Magdalena lagoonal complex to northern Peru's Punta Aguja.
- PNET: Temperate Northeastern Pacific; extends from the Gulf of California temperate waters north of Bahía Magdalena; to the Gulf of Alaska and southwest of the eastern Aleutian Islands.
- PSET: Temperate Southeastern Pacific; includes the temperate waters south of Peruvian Punta Aguja and Lobos de Tierra to Tierra del Fuego (Cape Horn).
- IGAL: Galapagos Islands, Ecuador.
- IMAL: Malpelo Island, Columbia.
- ICOC: Cocos Island, Costa Rica.
- IREV: Revillagigedos Islands, Costa Rica; includes Islas Socorro, Clarion, San Benedicto, and Roca Partida.
- ILTM: Islas Marías; Gulf of California - México; Islas Marías includes: Islas María Madre, María Magdalena, María Cleofas, and San Juanito.
- IGUA: Guadalupe Island, Gulf of California - México.
- RALI: Rocas Alijos, Gulf of California - México.
- ENGC: Endemic to the Gulf of California.
- PC: Central Pacific; includes the Pacific Plate west of the Eastern Pacific.
- OI: Indian Ocean.
- AW: Western Atlantic; includes the Atlantic Ocean west of the Mid-Atlantic Rise.
- ART: Arctic Ocean.
- CT: Circumtropical; includes the tropic oceans with occasional branches of distribution into temperate waters.

== Chart of Northern Gulf sea urchins, heart urchins, and sand dollars ==
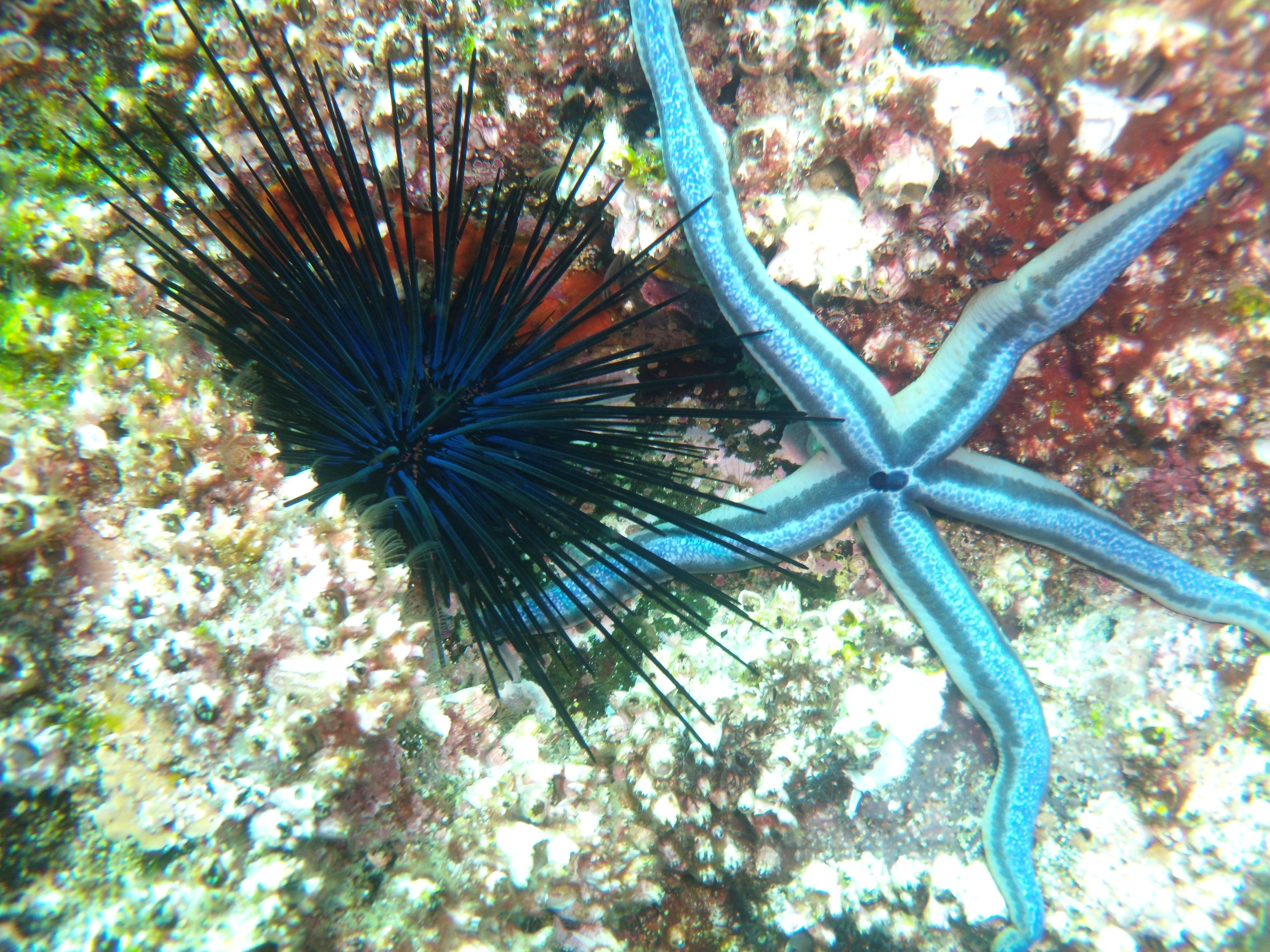
Diadema mexicanum

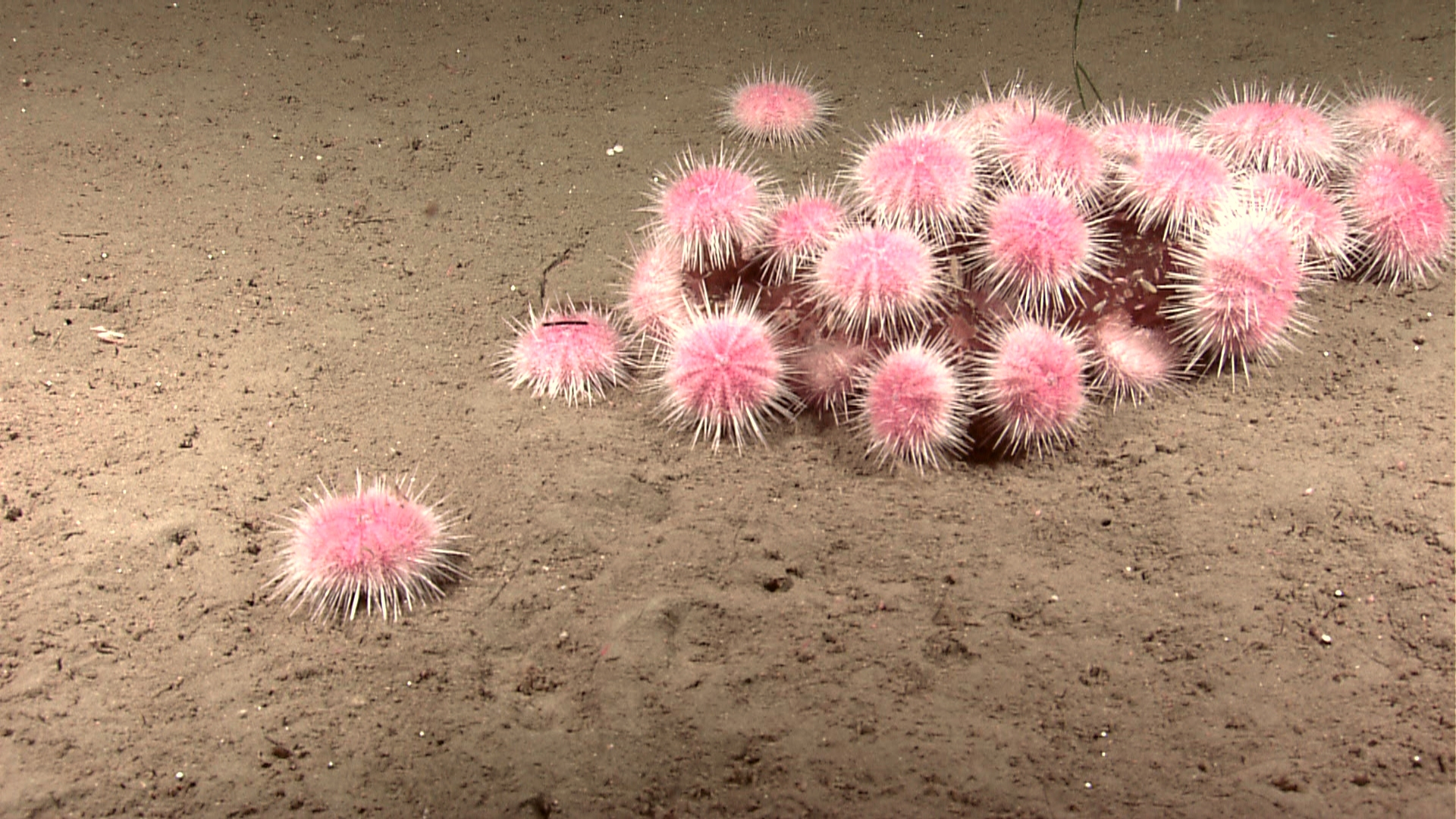
Allocentrotus fragilis

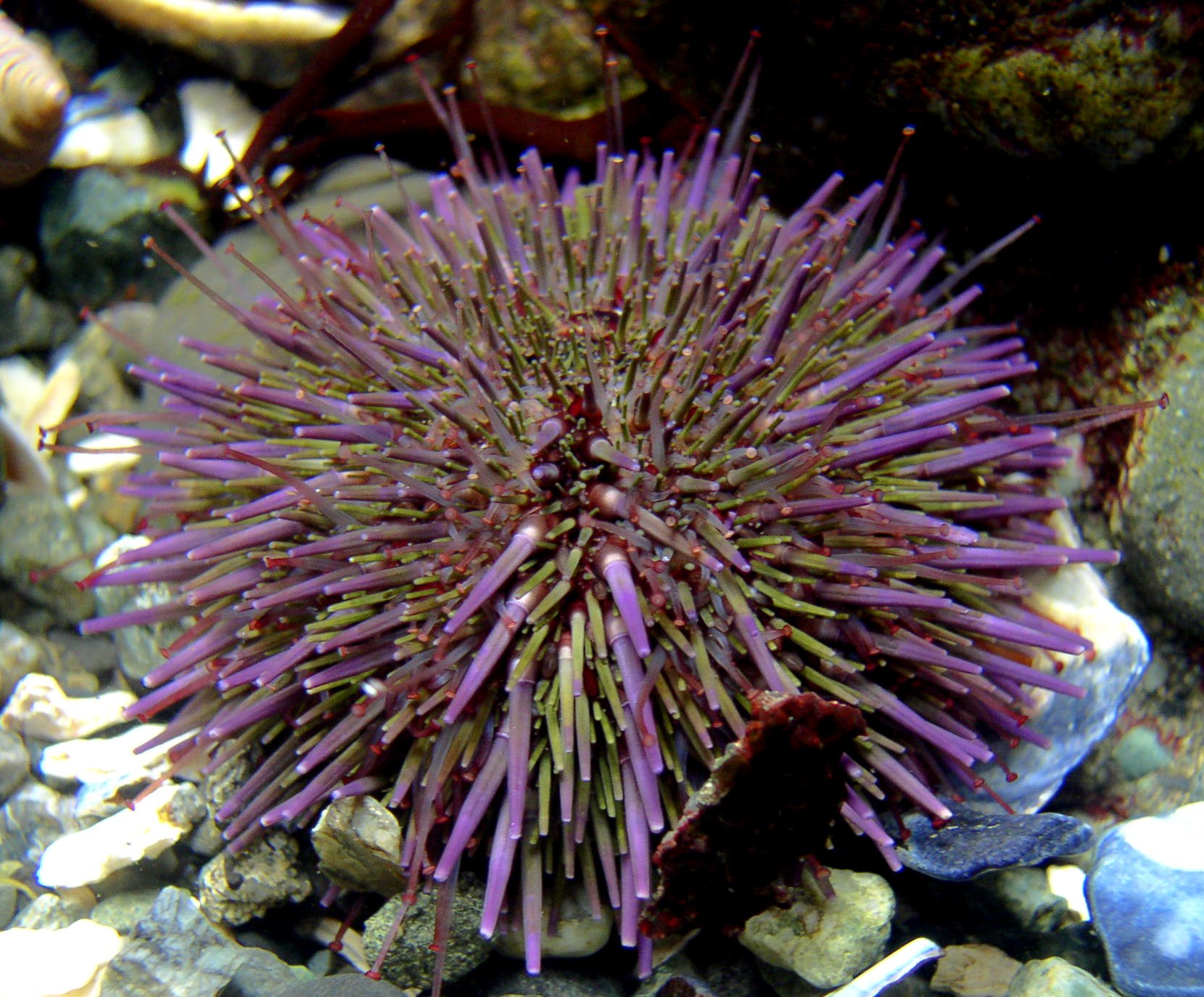
Strongylocentrotus purpuratus

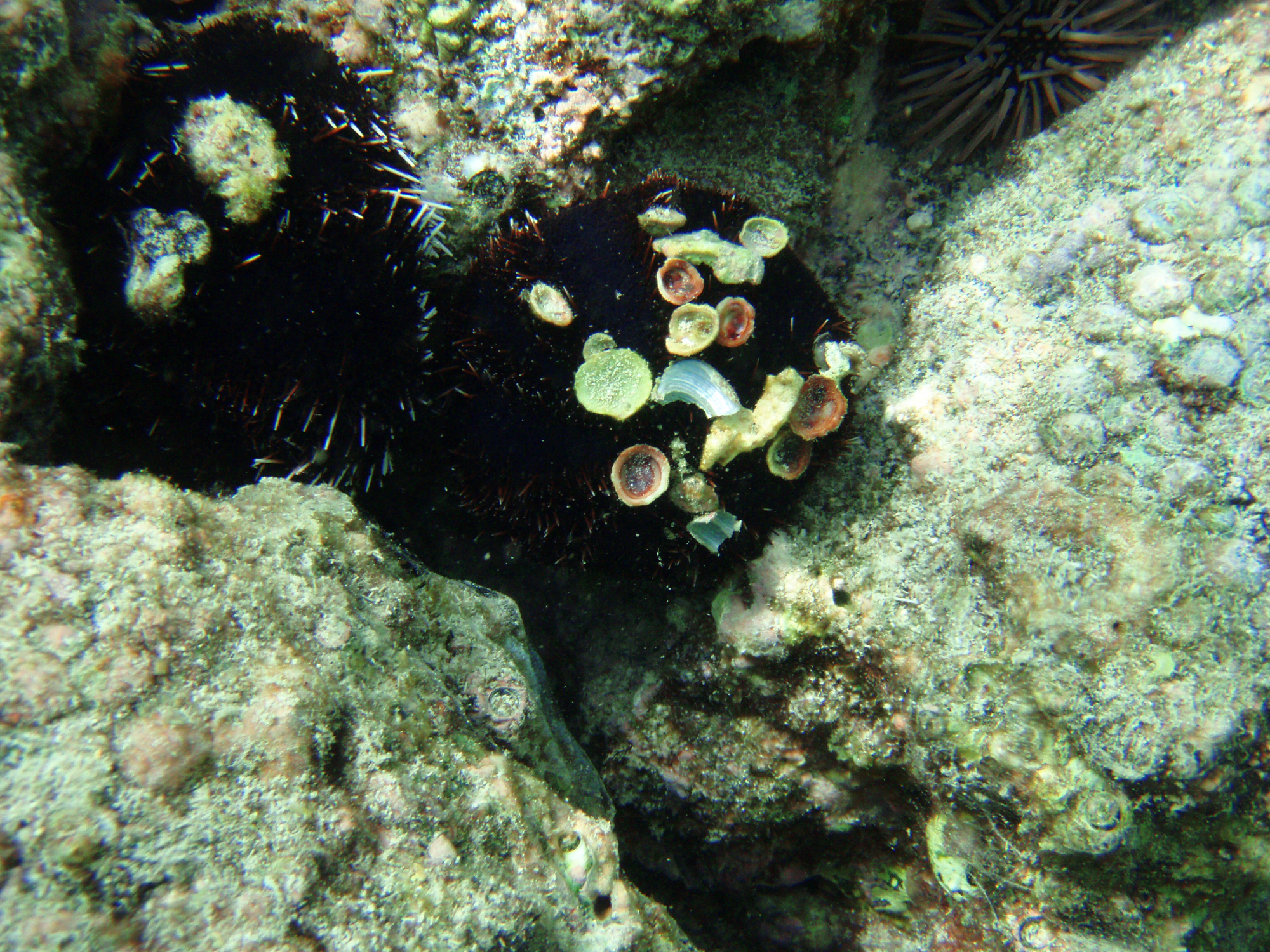
Tripneustes gratilla

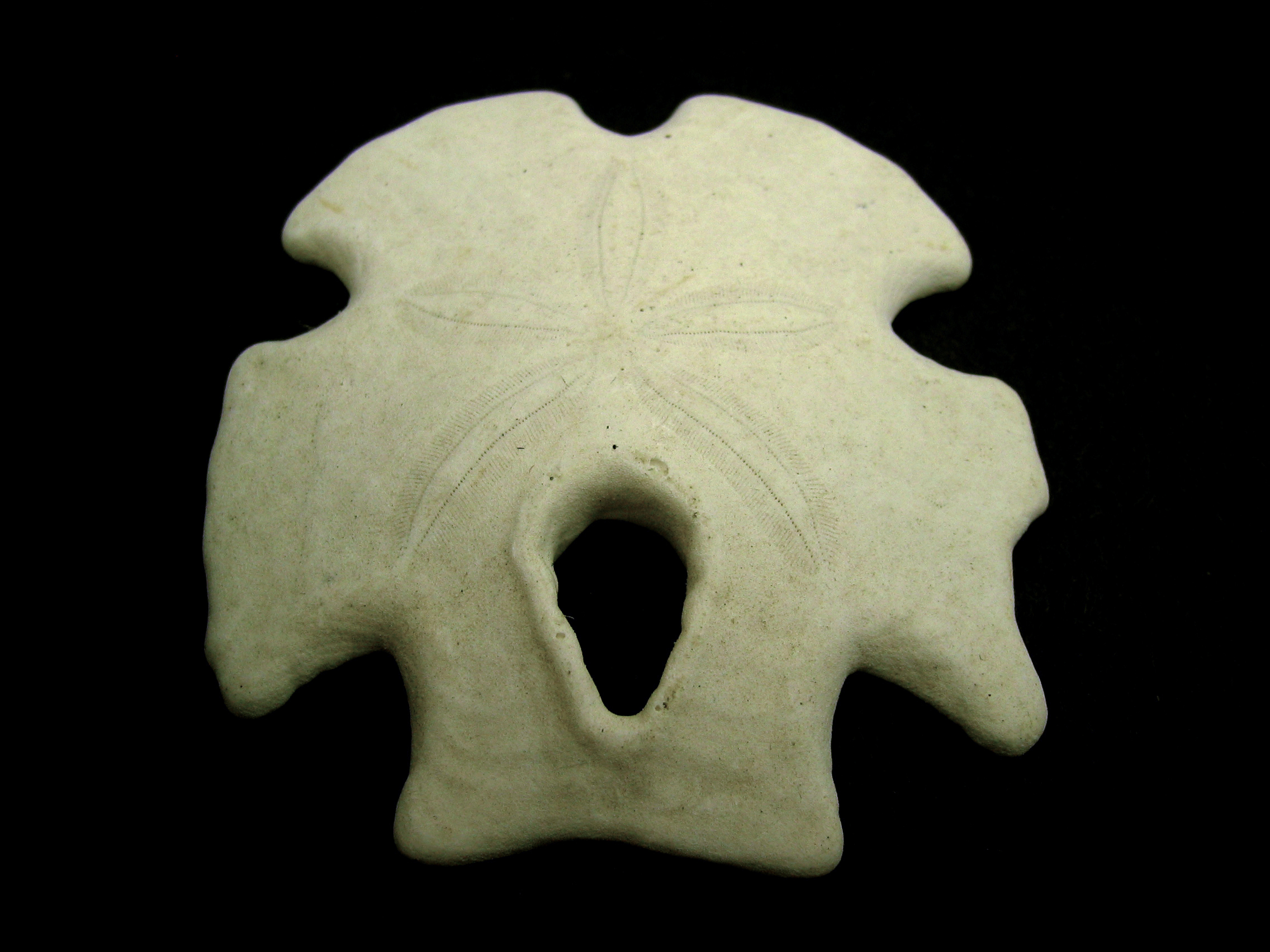
Encope grandis

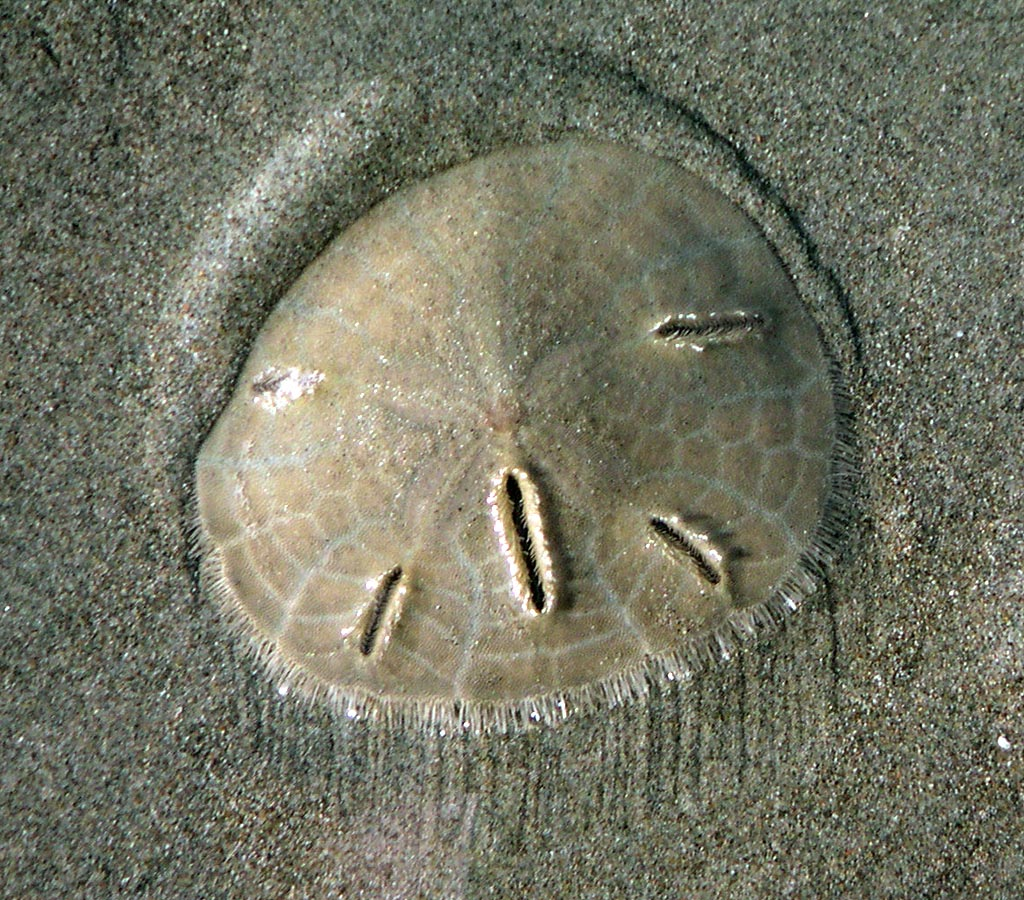
Mellita longifissa

Species of sea urchins, heart urchins, and sand dollars in the Northern Gulf of California, using the #World distribution acronyms for locations:

| Scientific name: | Biogeographic Distribution: | Depth Range (meters): | World Distribution: |
|---|---|---|---|
| Agassizia scrobiculata | GCN, GCC, GCS, SWB, RB | 0 - 220 | PET, IGAL |
| Allocentrotus fragilis | GCN, GCC, GCS | 50 - 1,200 | PET, PNET |
| Aporocidaris milleri | GCN, CCC, GCS, SWB | 300 - 3,937 | PET, ART, ANT, IMAL, IGAL |
| Arbacia incisa | GCN, GCC, GCS, RB, SWB | 0 - 52 | PET, PNET, PSET, IGAL |
| Astropyga pulvinata | GCN, GCC, GCS, SWB | 0 - 90 | PET, IREV, ILTM, IGAL, ICOC |
| Brisaster latifrons | GCN, GCC, GCS, RB | 9 - 2,817 | PET, PNET, IGAL, ILTM |
| Brissopsis columbaris | GCN, GCC, GCS | 899 - 1,271 | PET |
| Brissopsis pacifica | GCN, GCC, GCS, SWB | 9 - 2,379 | PET, PNET, OI, PC, IREV, IGAL, ICOC |
| Brissus obesus | GCN, GCC, GCS, RB, SWB | 0 - 240 | PET, IGAL, IGUA, PNET, RALI |
| Centrostephanus coronatus | GCN, GCC, GCS, SWB, RB | 0 - 125 | PET, PNET, IGAL, ICOC |
| Clypeaster europacificus | GCN, GCC, GCS | 0 - 401 | PET, IREV, ICOC, IGAL |
| Clypeaster ochrus | GCN, GCC, GCS, RB | 0 - 162 | PET, IREV, ILTM, IGAL, ICOC |
| Clypeaster rotundus | GCN, GCC, GCS, RB, SWB | 0 - 91 | PET, IREV, ILTM, ICOC, IGAL |
| Clypeaster speciosus | GCN, GCC, RB, SWB | 0 - 128 | PET, IGAL, IREV, ICOC |
| Diadema mexicanum | GCN, GCC, GCS, RB | 0 - 113 | PET, PNET, IGAL, ICOC, IMAL, ILTM, IREV |
| Echinometra oblonga | GCN, GCC, GCS | 0 - 34 | PET, IREV, IGAL, PW, OI |
| Echinometra vanbrunti | GCN, GCC, GCS, RB, SWB | 0 - 106 | PET, PNET, PSET, IGAL, ICOC, IREV, ILTM |
| Encope grandis | GCN, GCC, GCS, RB, SWB | 0 - 128 | PET, AW |
| Encope micropora | GCN, GCC, GCS, RB, SWB | 0 - 120 | PET, PNET, PSET, IREV, IGAL, ICOC |
| Encope perspectiva | GCN, GCC, GCS | 15 - 27 | PET, PNET, IGAL |
| Eucidaris thouarsii | GCN, GCC, GCS, RB, SWB | 0 - 150 | PET, PNET, IREV, ILTM, IGAL, ICOC, IMAL, IGAL |
| Hesperocidaris asteriscus | GCN, GCC, GCS | 2 - 183 | PET, IREV |
| Hesperocidaris perplexa | GCN, GCC, GCS | 13 - 1,500 | PET, IREV, PNET |
| Lovenia cordiformis | GCN, GCC, GCS, RB, SWB | 0 - 201 | PET, PNET, IREV, ICOC, IGAL, PC |
| Lytechinus pictus | GCN, GCC, GCS, RB, SWB | 0 - 300 | PET, PNET, ICOC, IGUA |
| Mellita grantii | GCN, GCC, GCS, RB | 0 - 6 | ENGC |
| Mellita longifissa | GCN, GCC, GCS, RB, SWB | 0 - 60 | PET, PNET |
| Meoma grandis | GCN, GCC, GCS, SWB | 0 - 200 | PET, IREV, ICOC, IGAL |
| Metalia nobilis | GCN, GCC, GCS, RB | 0 - 18 | PET |
| Moira atropos | GCN, GCC, GCS, RB | 0 - 160 | PET, PNET |
| Nacospatangus depressus | GCN, GCC | 5 - 302 | PET, PNET |
| Plagiobrissus pacificus | GCN, GCC, GCS | 6 - 137 | PET, ICOC |
| Spatangus californicus | GCN, GCC, GCS | 10 - 644 | PET, PNET |
| Strongylocentrotus purpuratus | GCN, GCC | 0 - 161 | PET, PNET, IGUA |
| Tripneustes gratilla | GCN, GCC, GCS | 0 - 73 | CT, PET, IREV, IGAL, IMAL |

The scientific names, biogeographic distributions, world distributions, and depth ranges found in the list above are from the Sea of Cortez Database.

A study from 2005 adds the following species : Lytechinus anamesus, Toxopneustes roseus, Cassidulus pacificus, Mellita kanakoffi, Encope wetmorei, Brissus latecarinatus, Metalia spatagus, Brisaster townsendi, Moira clotho.

== Summary of urchins of the Northern Gulf of California ==
- 35 species of echinoids (100%) occur in the Northern Gulf of California (GNC).
- 3 species (8.57%) are found in the Northern Gulf (GNC), Central Gulf (GCC), and outside of the Gulf, but are absent from the Southern Gulf.
- 32 species (91.43%) are found throughout the Gulf (GNC, GCC, GCS).
- 15 (42.86%) reside in the Southwest Baja California Sur Region (SBC) as well as in the Northern Gulf (GNC).
- 1 species (2.86%) is endemic to the Gulf of California (Mellita grantii).

== See also ==
- Category: Fauna of Gulf of California islands
- Category:Sea urchins
