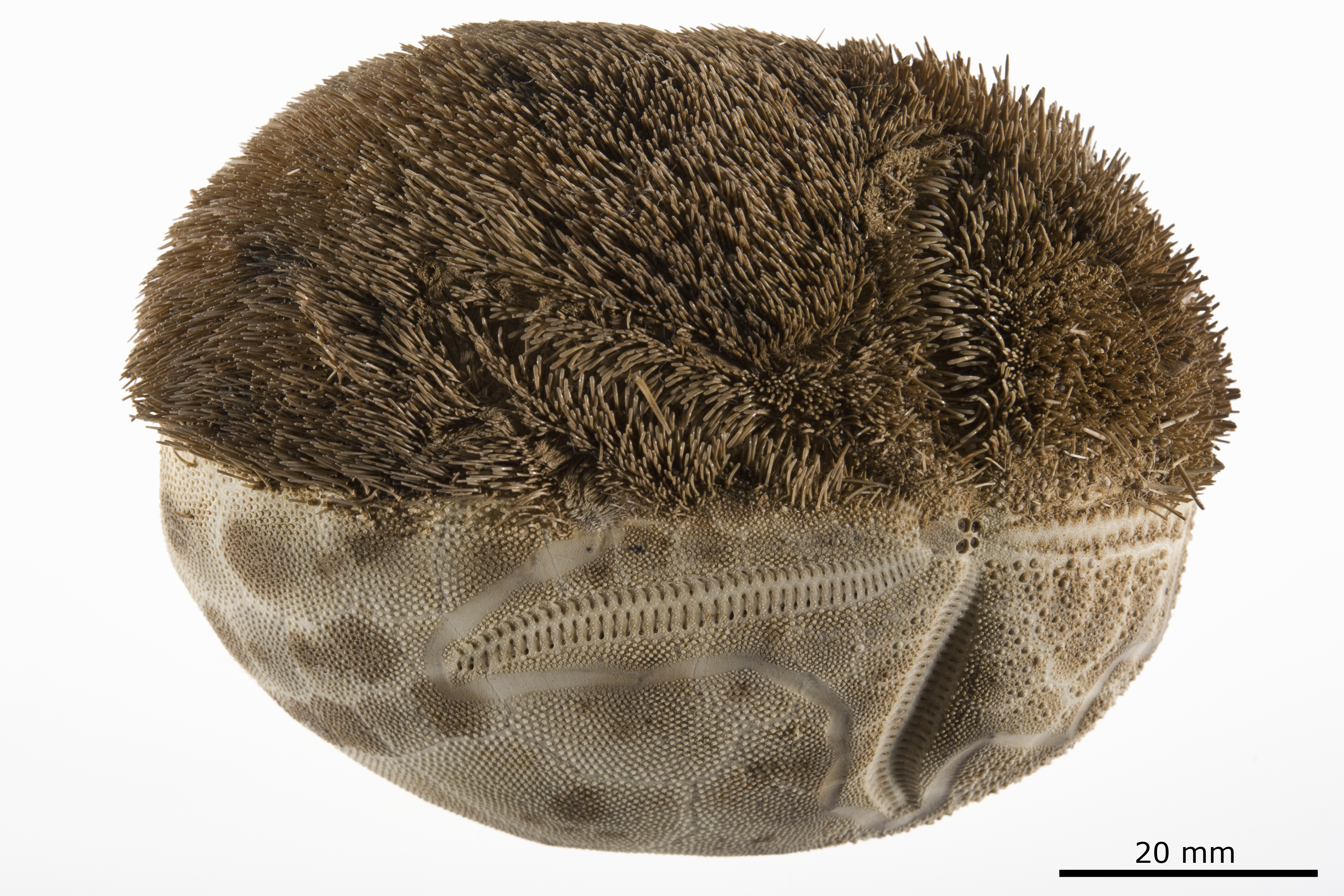

Scientific classification
- Kingdom: Animalia
- Phylum: Echinodermata
- Class: Echinoidea
- Order: Spatangoida
- Family: Brissidae
- Genus: Brissus
- Species: B. meridionalis

Binomial name
- Brissus meridionalis (Mortensen, 1950)

= Brissus meridionalis =

Species of sea urchin

Brissus meridionalis is a species of sea urchins of the family Brissidae. Their armour is covered with spines. Brissus meridionalis was first scientifically described in 1950 by Ole Theodor Jensen Mortensen.
