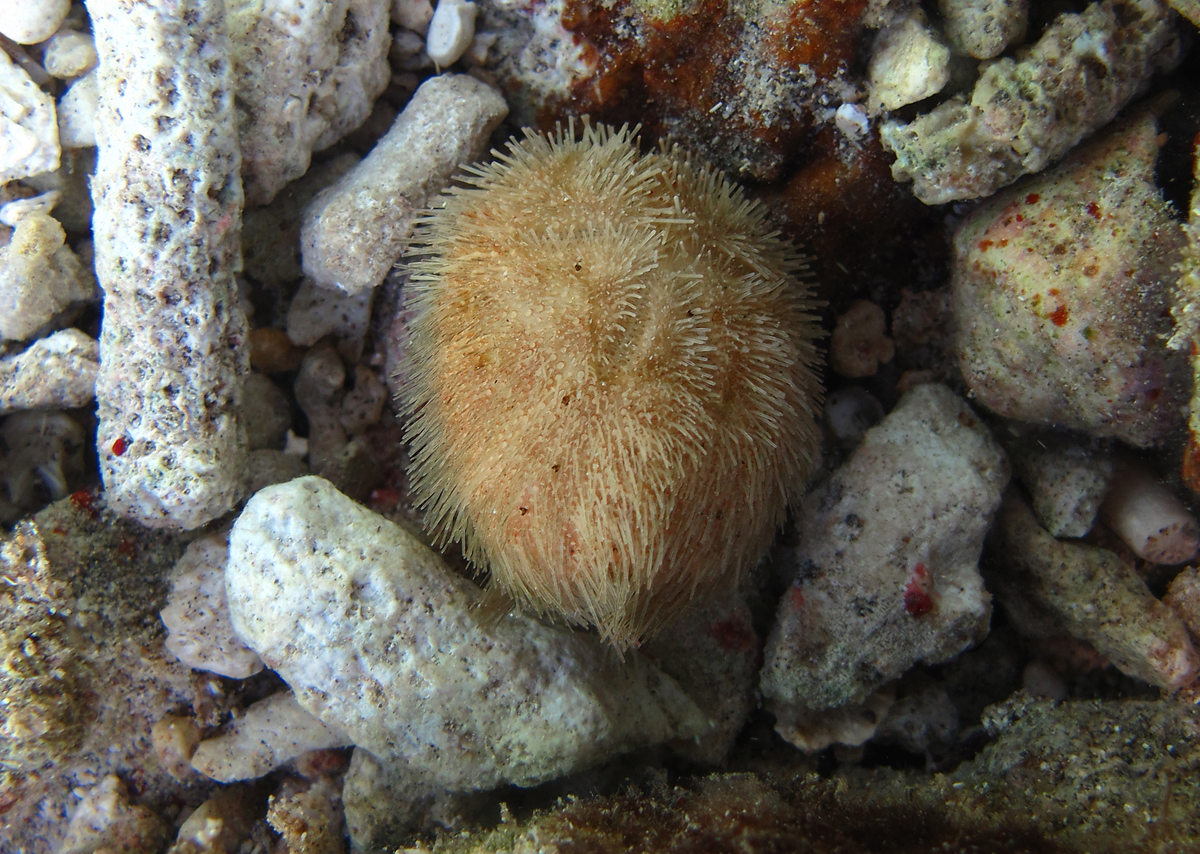

Scientific classification
- Kingdom: Animalia
- Phylum: Echinodermata
- Class: Echinoidea
- Order: Spatangoida
- Family: Brissidae
- Genus: Brissus
- Species: B. latecarinatus

Binomial name
- Brissus latecarinatus (Leske, 1778)

= Brissus latecarinatus =

Species of sea urchin

Brissus latecarinatus is a species of sea urchins of the family Brissidae. Its armour is covered with spines. Brissus latecarinatus was first scientifically described in 1778 by Nathanael Gottfried Leske.

== Distribution ==
It is distributed throughout the Indo-Pacific in tropical waters of the Indian Ocean, Western Pacific, and all oceans connecting the two bodies of water. It can be found on reefs at depths of up to 45 ft (14 m).

== Description ==
It is covered in short spines that are brown, pink, and green in color. It has a crescent shaped mouth and a large anal opening underneath. Its surface displays a five-part petaloid pattern. Specimens of a larger size reach lengths of 7 in (180 mm).

== Life cycle ==
Like other species of the Echinoidea class, this species is gonochoric. It uses external fertilization. Eggs are retained on the peristome, near the periproct, or deep inside the concavities on the petaloids during the typical practice of brooding. Embryos grow into planktotrophic larvae (echinoplateus), which descend to the bottom and use their tube feet to cling to the earth where they eventually transform into juvenile urchins. This process takes many months. The life cycle of B. latecarinatus is similar to that of other sea urchins.

== Behavior ==
This species inhabits places with seagrass and sandy bottoms. It is constantly immersed in the sand. buries itself in the sand, processing it to get rid of debris and other clinging materials. It is a bioturbator, engaging in the rework of soils and sediments.
