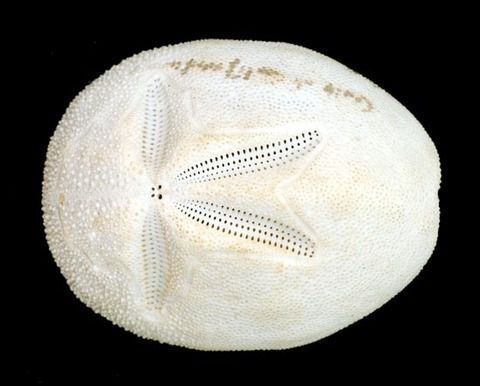

Scientific classification
- Kingdom: Animalia
- Phylum: Echinodermata
- Class: Echinoidea
- Order: Spatangoida
- Family: Brissidae
- Genus: Brissus
- Species: B. obesus

Binomial name
- Brissus obesus Verrill, 1867

= Brissus obesus =

Species of sea urchin

Brissus obesus is a species of sea urchins of the family Brissidae. Their armour is covered with spines. Brissus obesus was first scientifically described in 1867 by Verrill.
