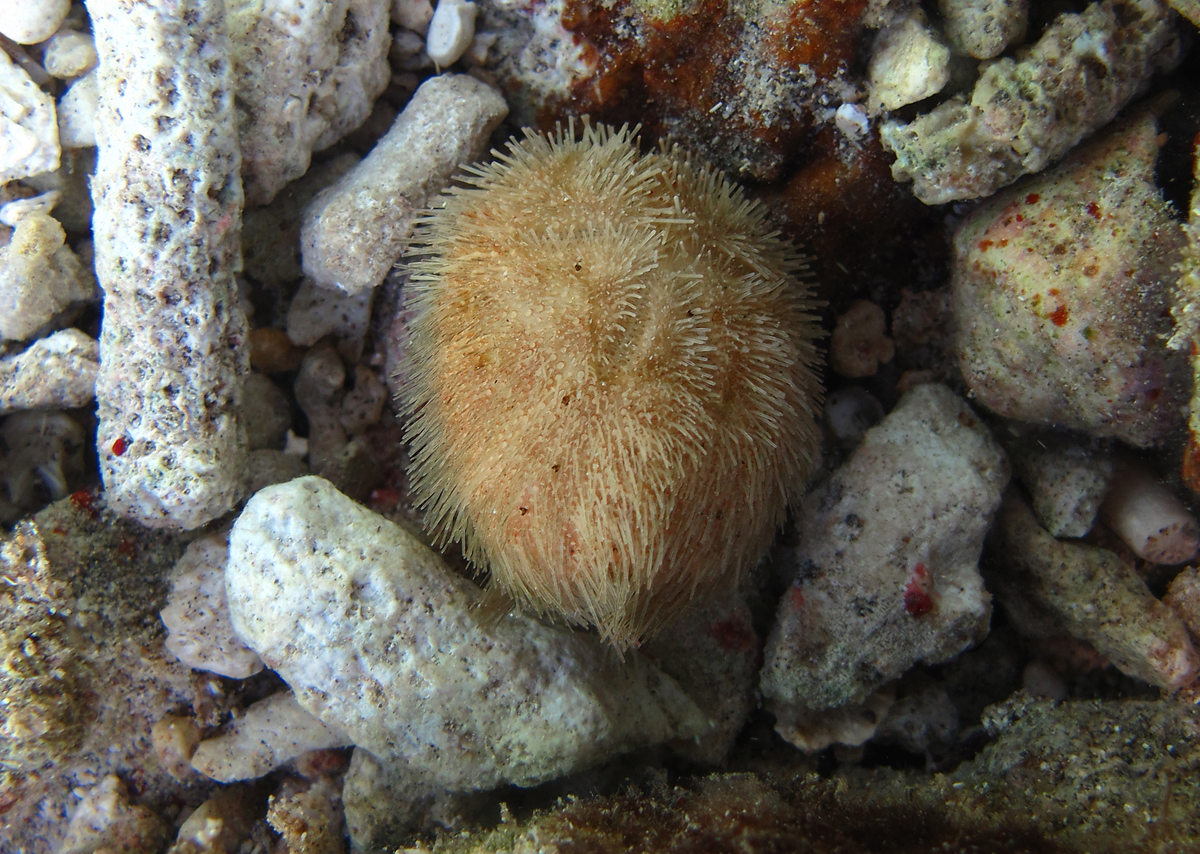
- Brissus latecarinatus

Scientific classification
- Kingdom: Animalia
- Phylum: Echinodermata
- Class: Echinoidea
- Order: Spatangoida
- Family: Brissidae
- Genus: Brissus; Gray, 1825

= Brissus =

Genus of echinoderms

Brissus is a genus of sea urchins belonging to the family Brissidae.

The genus has cosmopolitan distribution.

Species:

- Brissus agassizii Döderlein, 1885
- Brissus bridgeboronensis Carter, 1987
- Brissus camagueyensis Weisbord, 1934
- Brissus caobaense Sánchez Roig, 1953
- Brissus duperieri Castex, 1947
- Brissus durhami (Sánchez Roig, 1952)
- Brissus eximius Zittel, 1864
- Brissus expansus Forbes, 1846
- Brissus fosteri McNamara, Philip & Kruse, 1986
- Brissus gigas H.B.Fell, 1947
- Brissus glenni Cooke, 1959
- Brissus greifatensis Elattaar, 2001a
- Brissus inaequalis Forbes, 1846
- Brissus kewi Grant & Hertlein, 1938
- Brissus lasti Stockley, 1927
- Brissus latecarinatus (Leske, 1778)
- Brissus latidunensis Clegg, 1933
- Brissus meridionalis (Mortensen, 1950)
- Brissus miocaenicus Schaffer, 1961
- Brissus obesus Verrill, 1867
- Brissus rana Forbes, 1846
- Brissus sagrae Lambert, 1924
- Brissus shaimaae Ali, 1985
- Brissus unicolor (Leske, 1778)

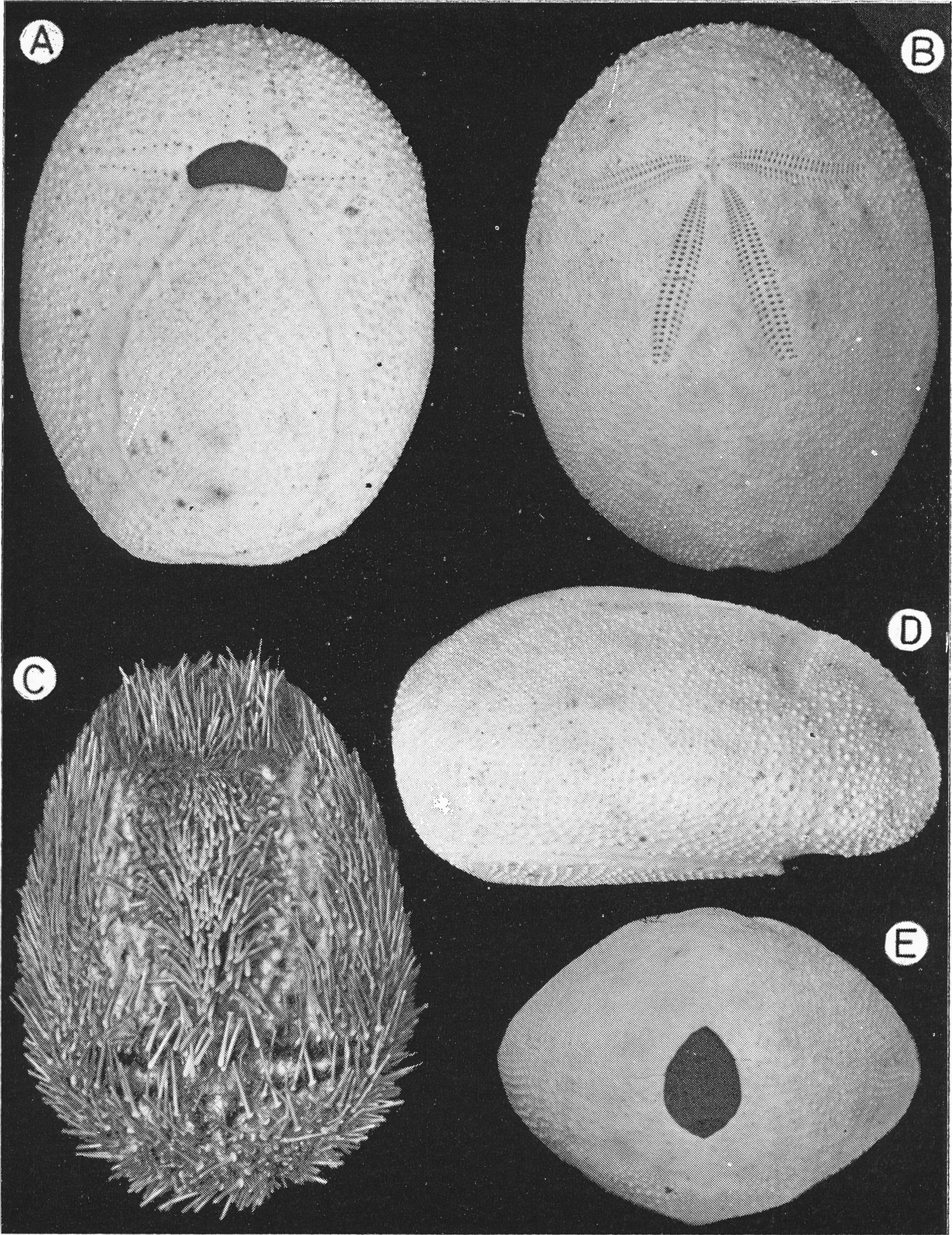
Brissus agassizii

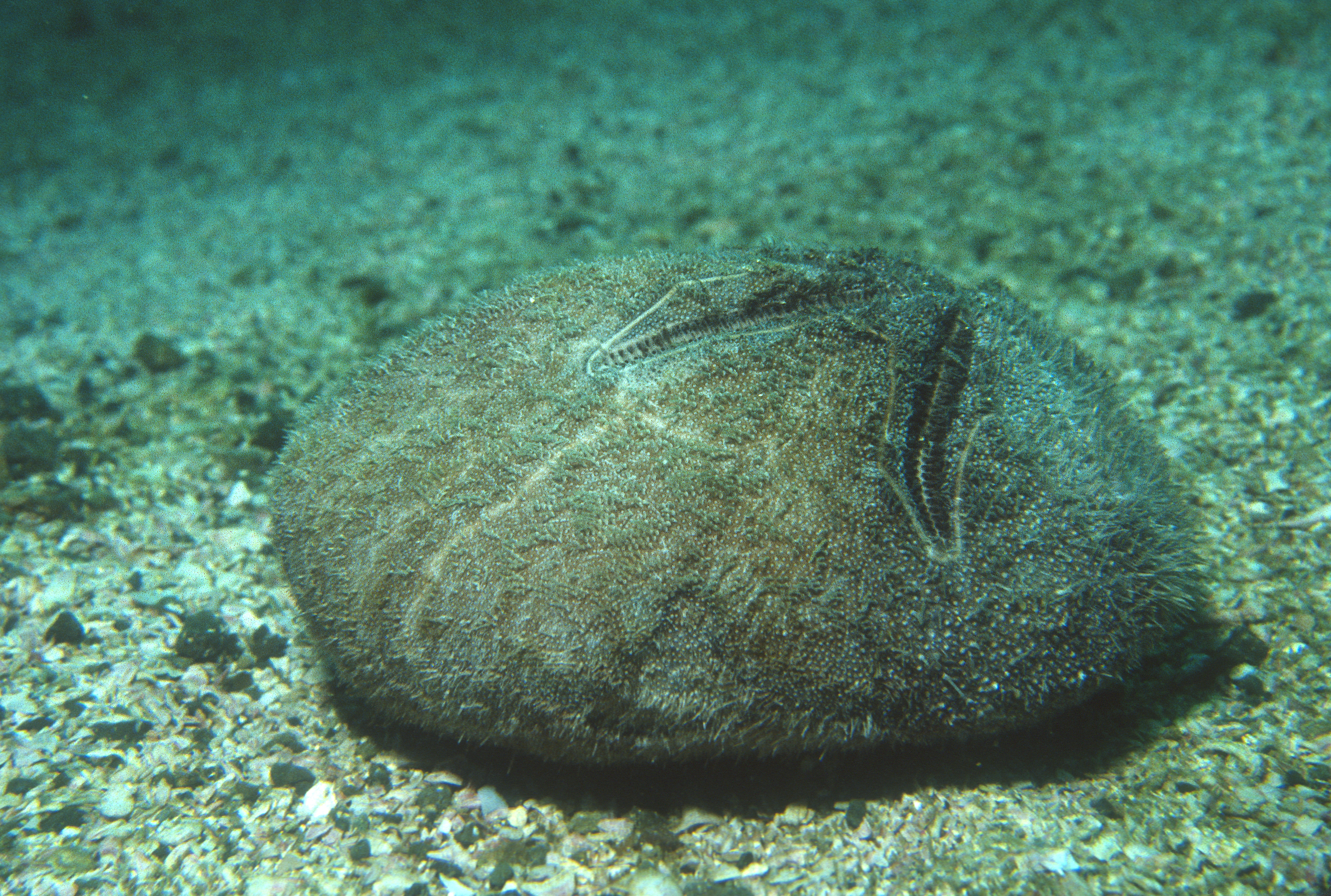
Brissus gigas

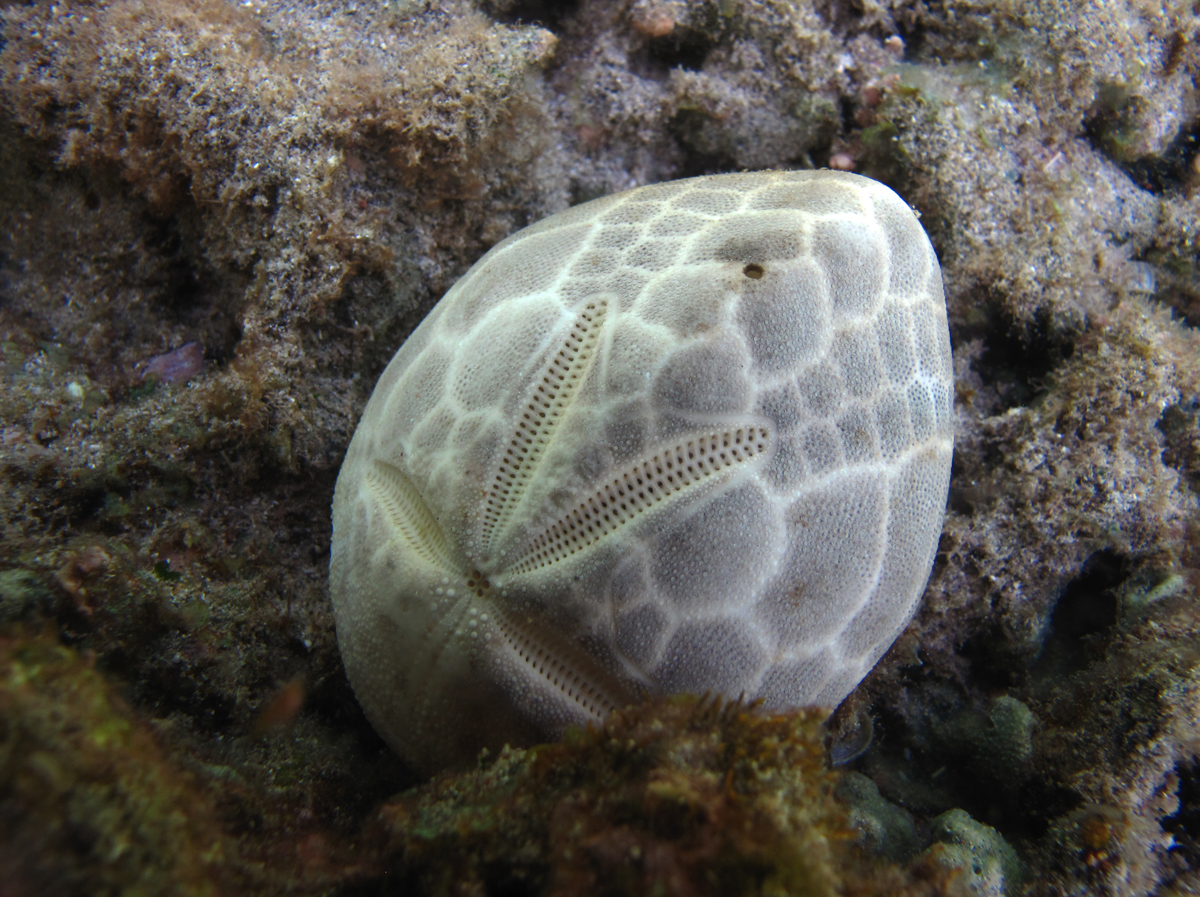
Brissus latecarinatus

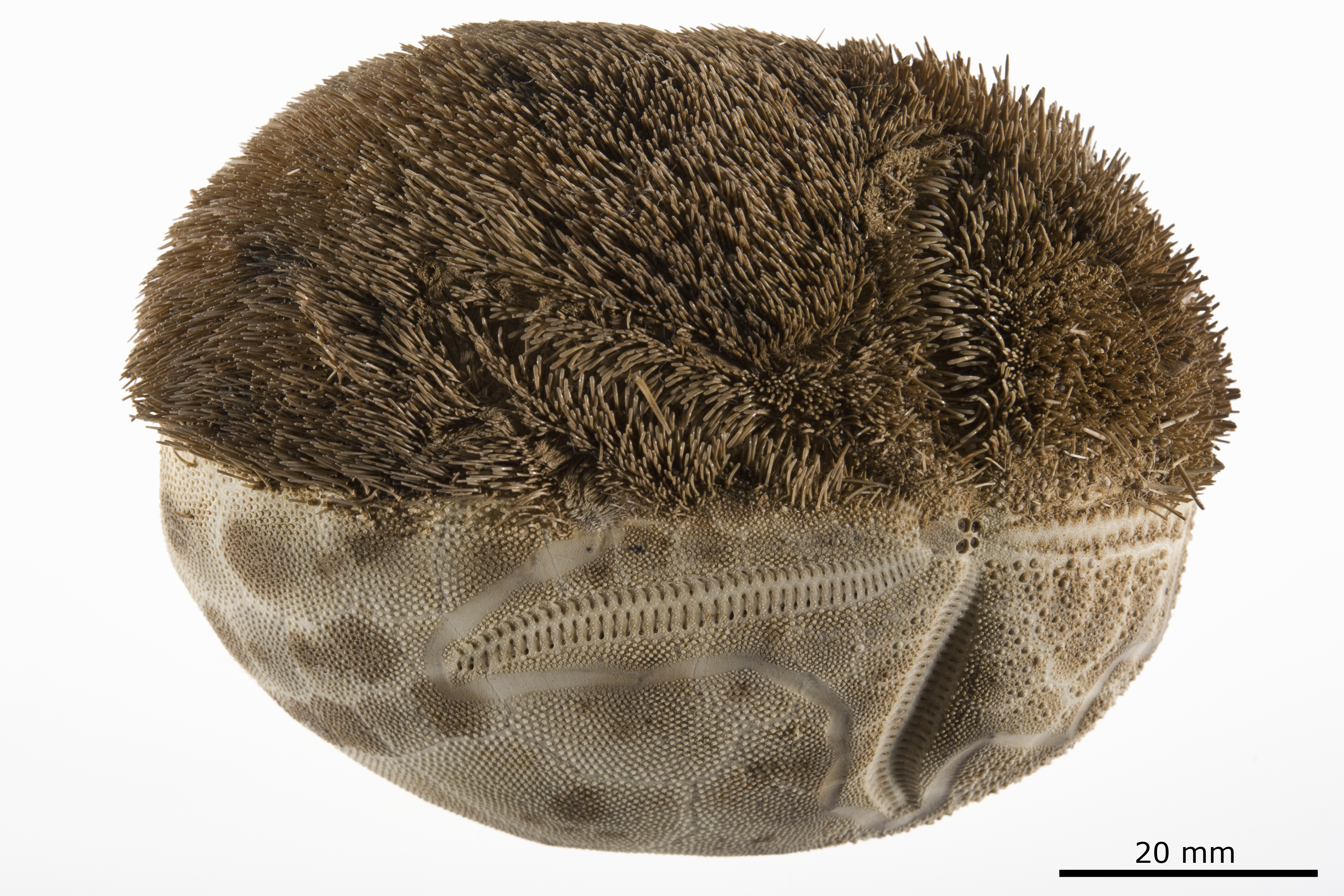
Brissus meridionalis

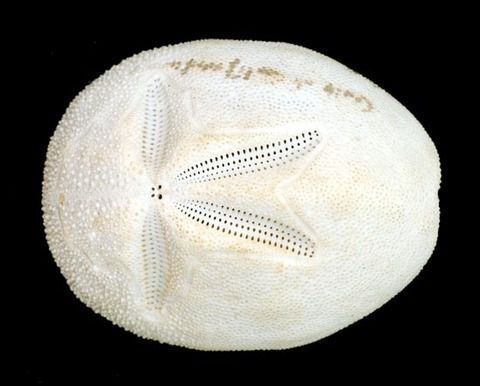
Brissus obesus

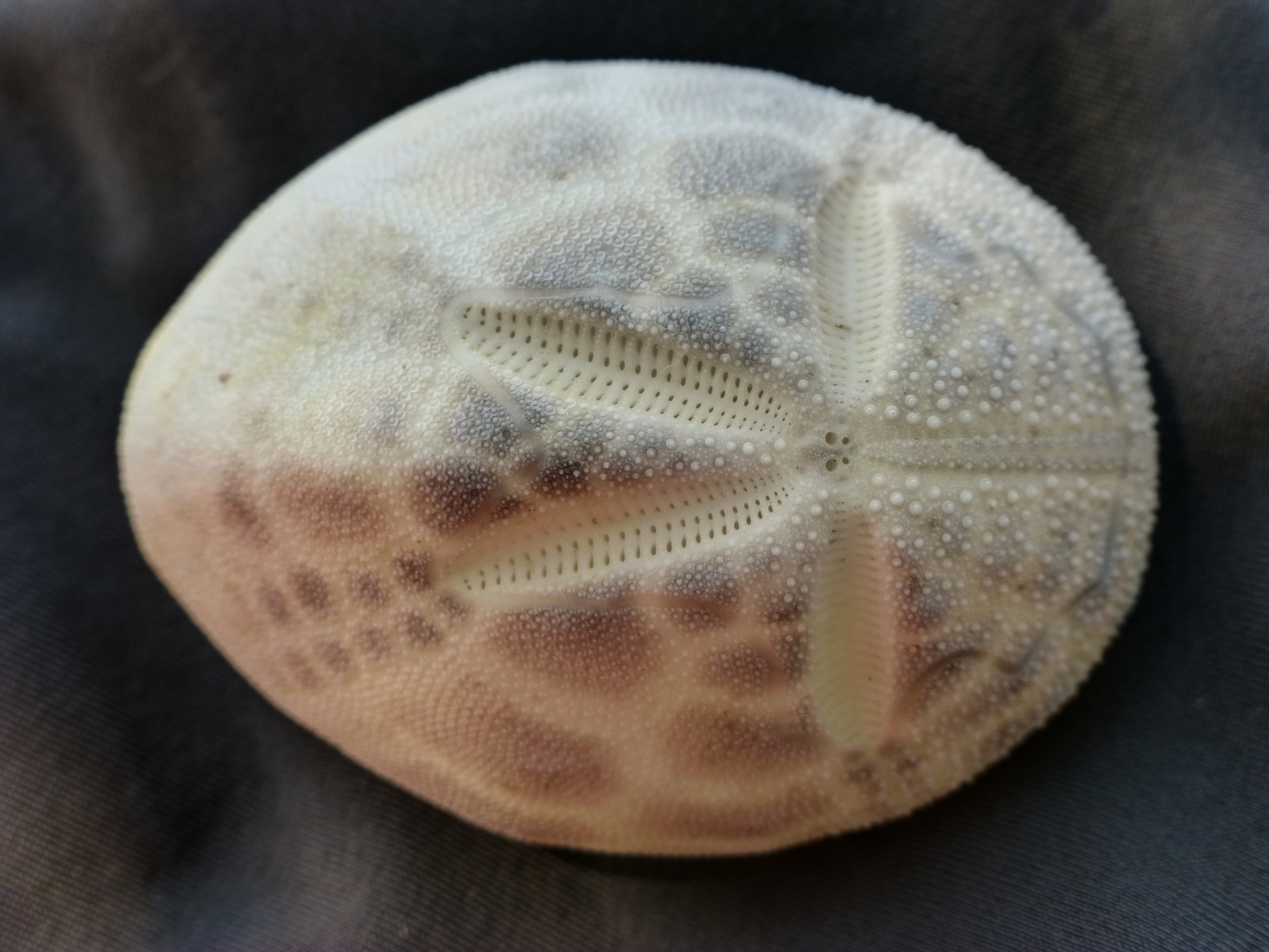
Brissus unicolor
