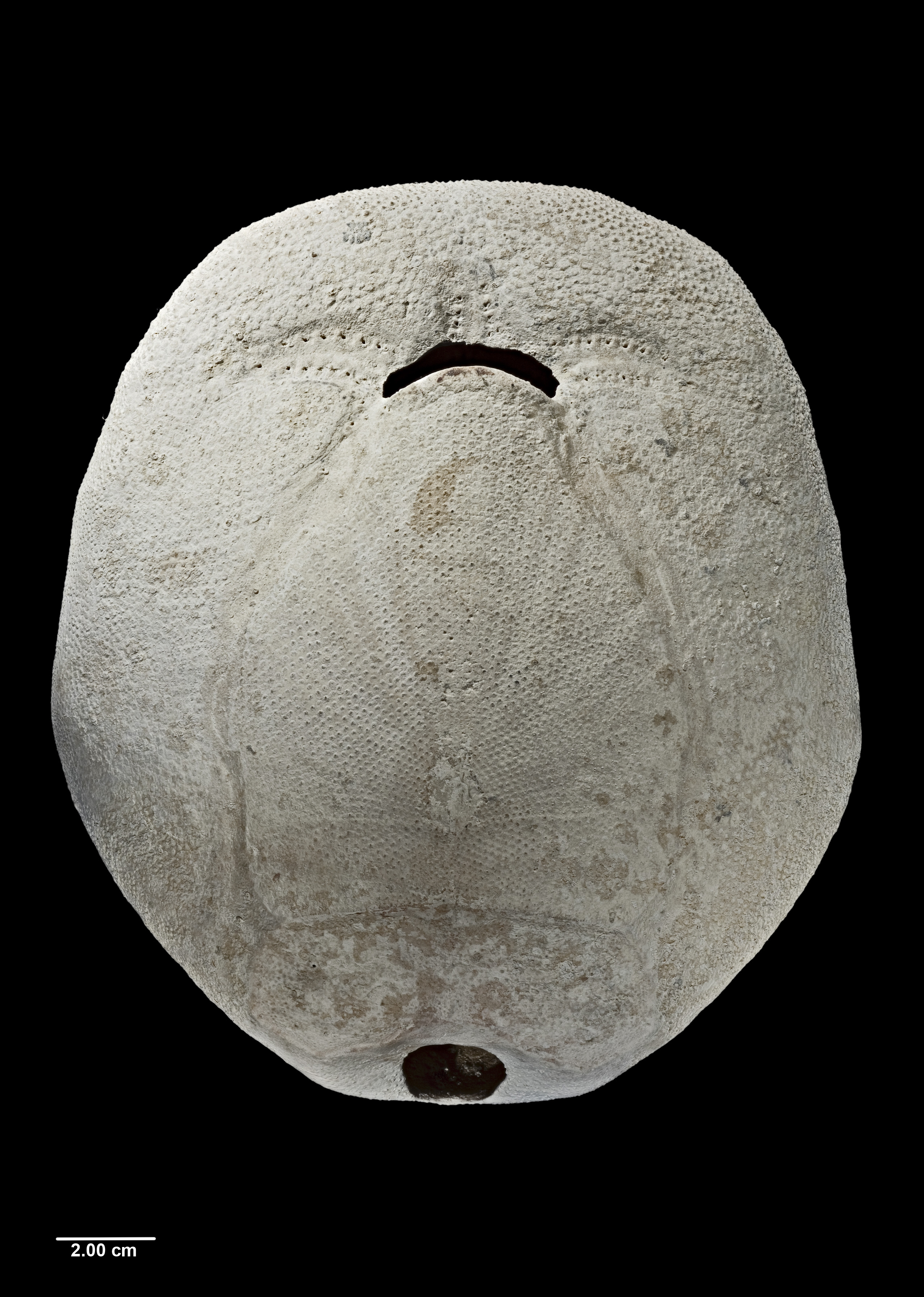
- test

Scientific classification
- Kingdom: Animalia
- Phylum: Echinodermata
- Class: Echinoidea
- Order: Spatangoida
- Family: Brissidae
- Genus: Brissus
- Species: B. gigas

Binomial name
- Brissus gigas H.B. Fell, 1947

= Brissus gigas =

Species of sea urchin

Brissus gigas, also known as the giant heart urchin, is a species of sea urchins of the family Brissidae. Their armour is covered with spines. Brissus gigas was first scientifically described in 1947 by H.B. Fell.

== Description ==
Most documented specimens of Brissus gigas range between 50–190mm in length, however the largest specimen of Brissus gigas was collected off the coast of Great Mercury Island in 2009, measuring 193mm.

== Distribution ==
Specimens of this species have been found around the north and north-east coast of the North Island, from Manawatāwhi / Three Kings Islands down to Great Mercury Island. Brissus gigas is found in sandy or muddy burrows close to coasts, in the sublittoral zone. Between 1982-3, deoxidisation from a plankton bloom of Cerataulina pelagica caused mass deaths of the species in the Hauraki Gulf.
