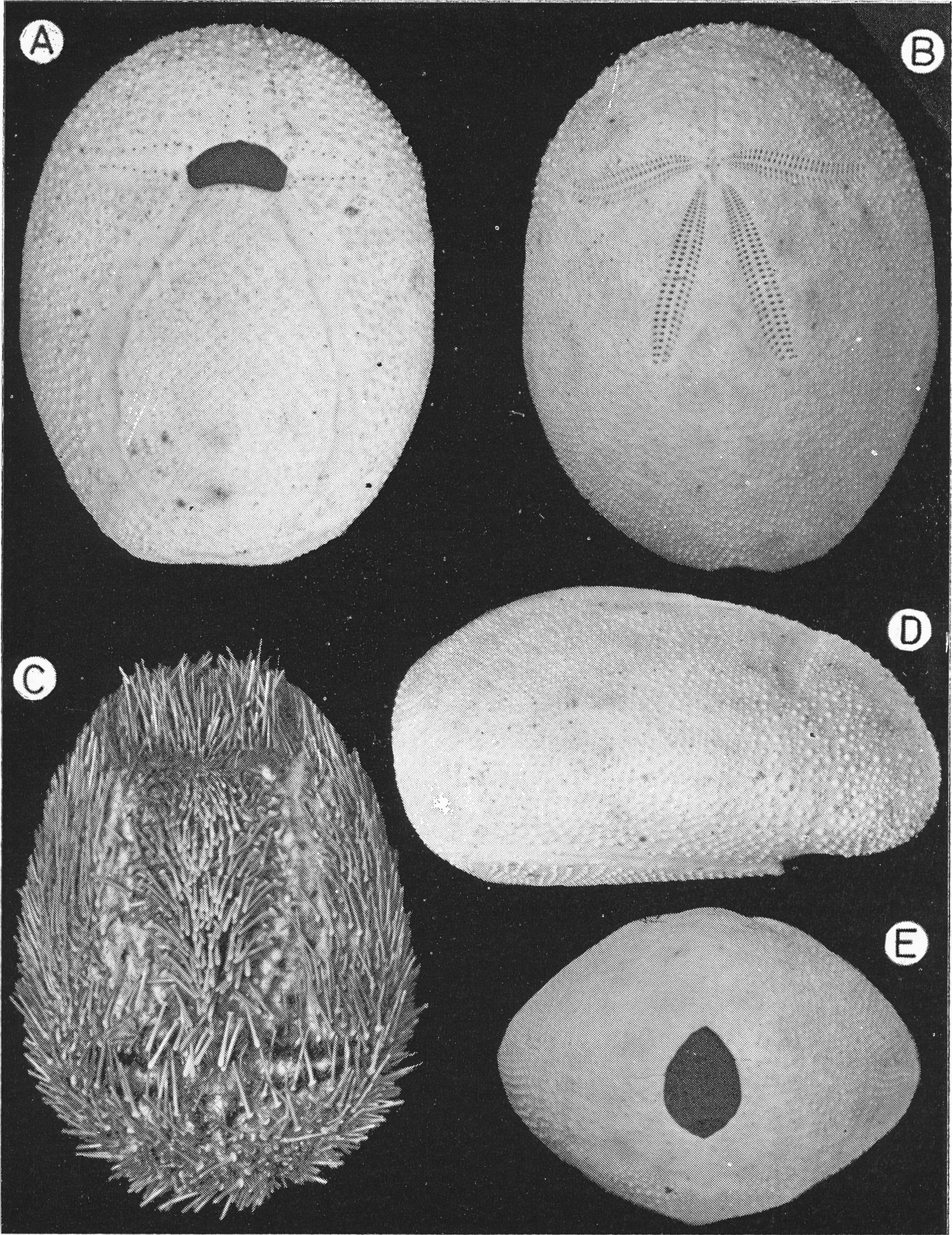
- Brissus (Allobrissus) agassizii. A: denuded test, abactinal view; B: test, actinal view; C: specimen with radioles, abactinal view; D: denuded test, side view; E: test, posterior end

Scientific classification
- Kingdom: Animalia
- Phylum: Echinodermata
- Class: Echinoidea
- Order: Spatangoida
- Family: Brissidae
- Genus: Brissus
- Species: B. agassizii

Binomial name
- Brissus agassizii Döderlein, 1885

= Brissus agassizii =

Species of sea urchin

Brissus agassizii is a species of sea urchins of the family Brissidae. Their armour is covered with spines. Brissus agassizii was first scientifically described in 1885 by Döderlein.
