= Nathanael Gottfried Leske =

German natural scientist and geologist (1751–1786)

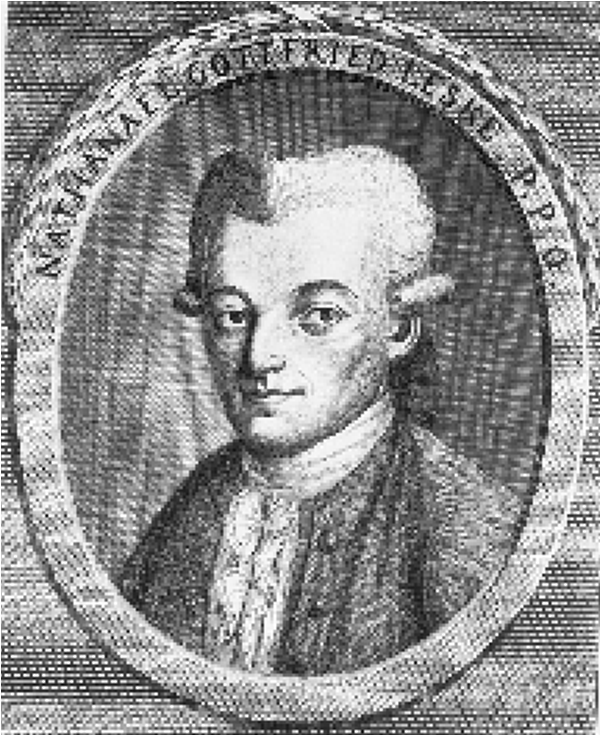
Nathanael Gottfried Leske

Nathanael Gottfried Leske (22 October 1751 in Muskau – 25 November 1786 in Marburg) was a German natural scientist and geologist from the Holy Roman Empire. He published over thirty scientific articles or books in his relatively short career. He was a collector of natural history specimens that are in the National Museum of Ireland and was an influence on early geological theories, in particular as a supporter of Plutonism.

After his studies at Bergakademie of Freiberg in Saxony and the Franckeschen Stiftungen in Halle, Leske became a special professor of natural history at the University of Leipzig in 1775.

From 1777 to 1786, he taught economics at this university, and in 1786, he was called to the chair of financial science and economics at the University of Marburg. However, he had a fatal accident on his way to Marburg.

Throughout his life, Leske corresponded with his teacher and close friend of Abraham Gottlob Werner, famous geologist and mineralogist at Weimar. He also edited the Leipziger Magazin zur Naturkunde, Mathematik und Oekonomie (1781-1789) with Christlieb Benedict Funk and Carl Friedrich Hindenburg.

Leske possessed an extensive mineral and natural history collection called the Leskean Cabinet, which was arranged after his death by Dietrich Ludwig Gustav Karsten and later, in 1792, sold to the Dublin Society (now the Royal Dublin Society). The collection included other natural history specimens many from the collections of Giovanni Arduino, Johann Friedrich Gmelin and Johan Christian Fabricius. These specimens are now in the National Museum of Ireland - Natural History.

== Works ==
- Ichthyologiae Lipsiensis specimen. Lipsiae: Siegfrief Lebrecht Crusius, 1774.
- with Jacob Theodor Klein Additamenta ad Jacob Theodor Klein Naturalem dispositionem echinodermatum et lucubratiunculam de aculeis echinorum marinorum Lipsiae Ex Officina Gleditschiana, 1778. BHL
- Anfangsgrunde der Naturgeschichte. Zwote [sic] verbesserte und viel vermehrte Ausgabe. Leipzig: Siegfried Lebrecht Crusius, 1784.
- Reise durch Sachsen in Rüksicht der Naturgeschichte und Ökonomie unternommen und beschrieben. Leipzig: J.G. Müllersche Buchhandlung, 1785
- Museum Leskeanum Leipzig: J.G. Müller, 1789. BHL
