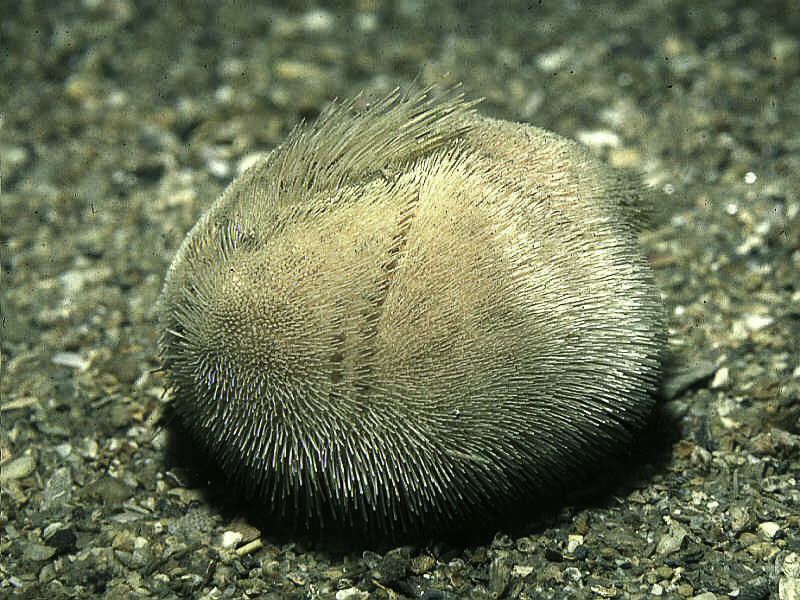
- Specimen recorded off Torbay

Scientific classification
- Kingdom: Animalia
- Phylum: Echinodermata
- Class: Echinoidea
- Order: Spatangoida
- Family: Loveniidae
- Genus: Echinocardium
- Species: E. pennatifidum

Binomial name
- Echinocardium pennatifidum Norman, 1868

Synonyms
- Amphidetus pennatifidus (Norman, 1868); Echinocardium pinnatifidum Norman, 1868; Echinocardium gibbosus Barrett, 1857 non L. Agassiz & Desor, 1847

= Echinocardium pennatifidum =

Species of sea urchin

Echinocardium pennatifidum is a species of sea urchin in the family Loveniidae, chiefly found in the northeast Atlantic region.

== Description ==
Echinocardium pennatifidum is up to 7 cm (2.8 in) long. It has coarser, more regularly arranged spines than other Echinocardium. The frontal ambulacrum is flush with the front of the heart-shaped test. It has a short labrum, not reaching the second pair of ambulacral plates. The specific name means "cut into the shape of a feather." This species is critically distinguished from Echinocardium flavescens by its short labrum and the absence of larger spines in the interambulacral areas of the upper side of the test. Up to 7cm in length.

== Distribution ==
Found in the waters off Great Britain, Ireland, the North Sea and associated islands.

== Ecology ==
Echinocardium pennatifidum buries itself in coarse sand or fine shell gravel in the sublittoral, from low on shore to depths of 150 m (490 ft).

== Gallery ==
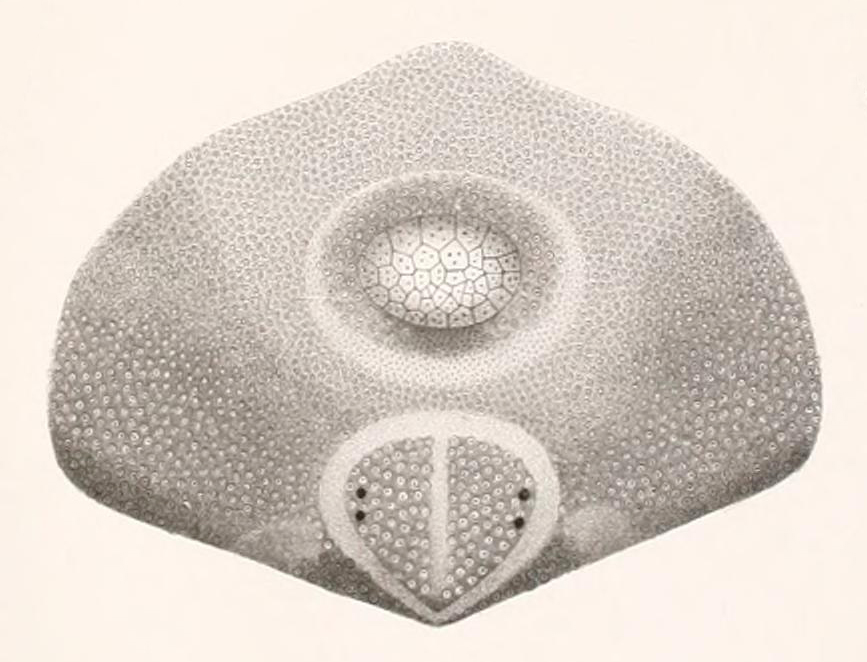
Posterior surface

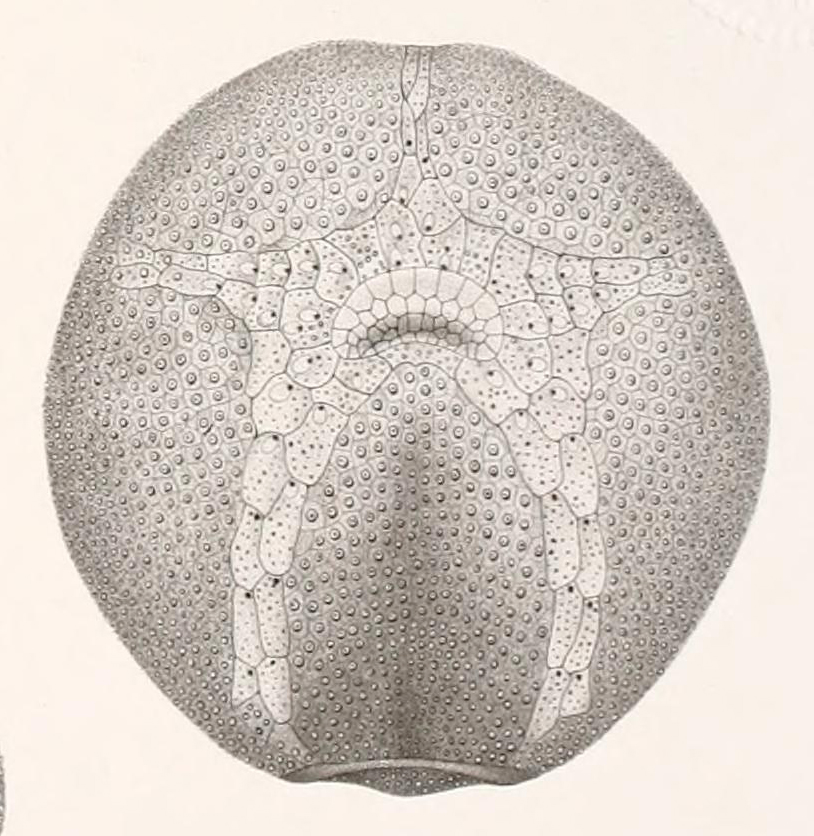
Ventral surface

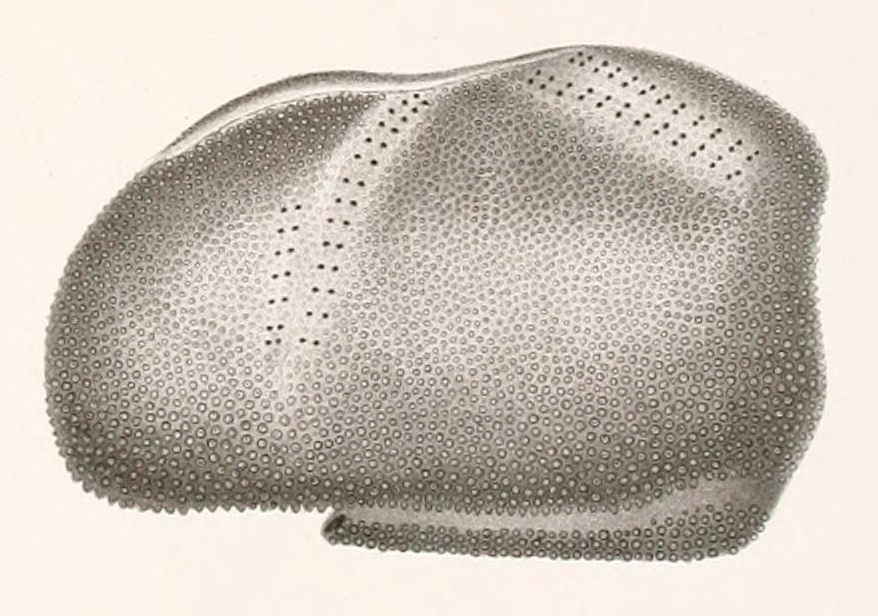
Lateral view of test

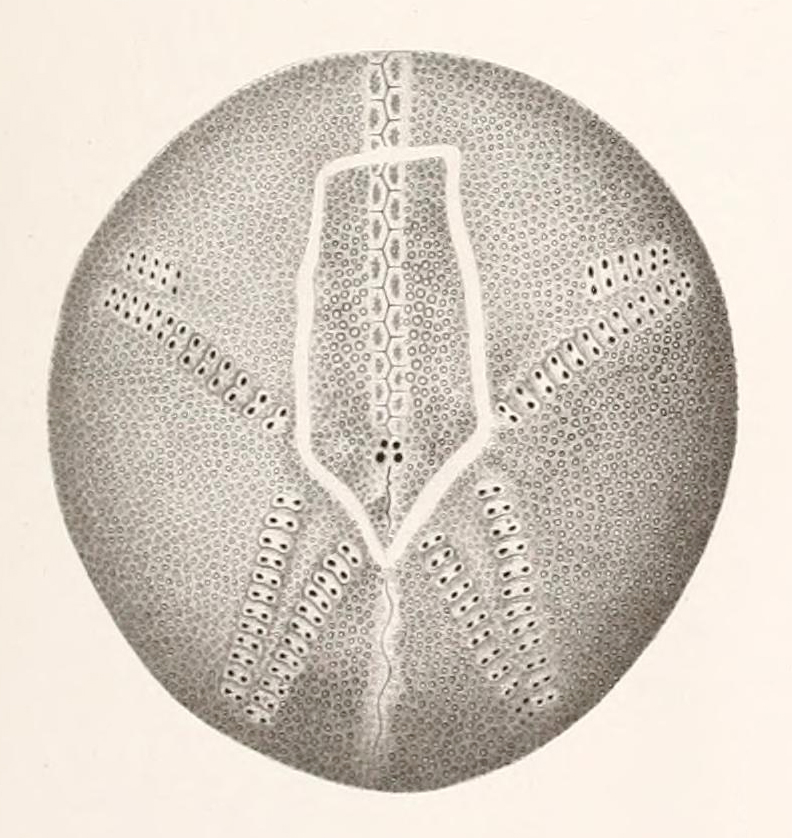
Dorsal surface of test
