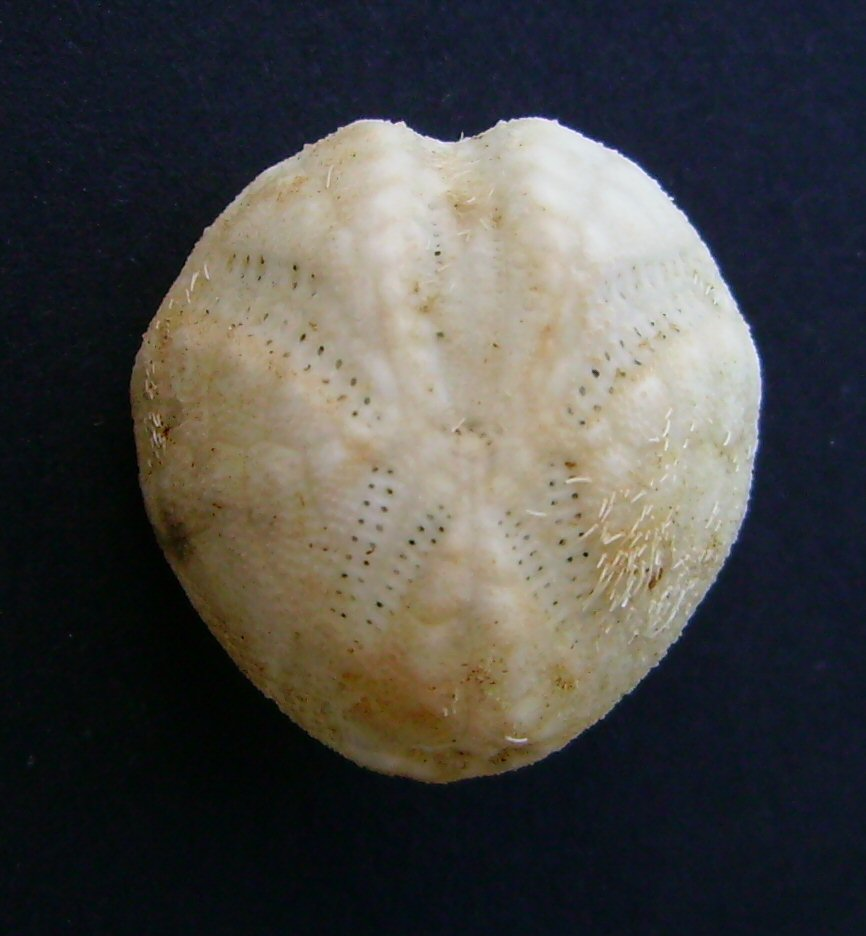
- Test of Echinocardium australe

Scientific classification
- Kingdom: Animalia
- Phylum: Echinodermata
- Class: Echinoidea
- Order: Spatangoida
- Family: Loveniidae
- Genus: Echinocardium
- Species: E. australe

Binomial name
- Echinocardium australe Gray, 1851

= Echinocardium australe =

Species of sea urchin

Echinocardium australe is a sea urchin in the family, Loveniidae, first described by John Edward Gray in 1851, from specimens collected in Port Jackson and Tasmania. It is a synonym of Echinocardium cordatum.
