= Alfred Norman =

Alfred Norman may refer to:

- Alfred Merle Norman (1831–1918), English clergyman and naturalist
- Alfred Norman (cricketer) (1885–1963), New Zealand cricketer
