= Urothoides kurrawa =

Scientific classification
- Domain: Eukaryota
- Kingdom: Animalia
- Phylum: Arthropoda
- Class: Malacostraca
- Order: Amphipoda
- Family: Urothoidae
- Genus: Urothoides
- Species: U. kurrawa

Binomial name
- Urothoides kurrawa Barnard & Drummond, 1979

Species of crustacean

Holotype site: Crib Point'"`UNIQ--ref-00000006-QINU`"'

Urothoides kurrawa is a species of amphipod crustacean, in the family Urothoidae. The species was first described in 1979 by Barnard & Drummond. The holotype was collected at Crib Point on Westernport Bay.
