= Sea potato =

Sea potato may refer to:

== Biology ==
- Colpomenia peregrina, a species of brown algae more commonly known as oyster thief or bladder weed
- Leathesia marina, formerly Leathesia difformis, another species of brown algae more commonly known as sea cauliflower
- Species of littoral sea urchins, especially heart urchins
- Echinocardium cordatum, a specific species of urchin, commonly known as common heart urchin.
- Echinocardium flavescens, called the yellow sea potato

== Geology ==
- Manganese nodule, also known as polymetallic nodules or ferromanganese modules, mineral concretions on the sea bottom
