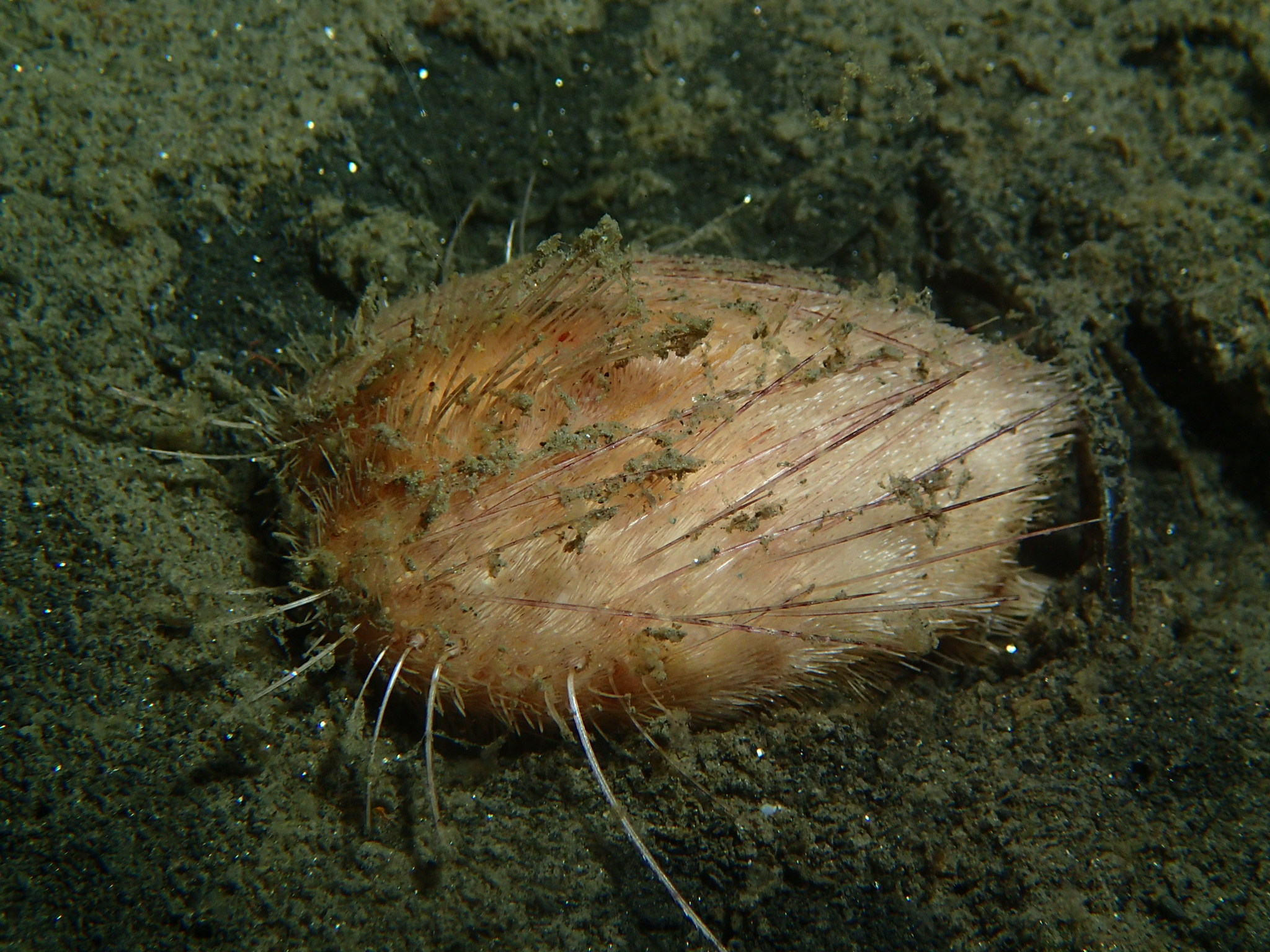
- Specimen recorded off Southern California

Scientific classification
- Kingdom: Animalia
- Phylum: Echinodermata
- Class: Echinoidea
- Order: Spatangoida
- Family: Loveniidae
- Genus: Lovenia
- Species: L. cordiformis

Binomial name
- Lovenia cordiformis A. Agassiz, 1872

= Lovenia cordiformis =

Species of sea urchin

Lovenia cordiformis is a sea urchin in the family Loveniidae. It is found on the sandy sea floor in the Eastern Pacific Ocean.

== Description ==
Lovenia cordiformis is up to 7.5 cm (3.0 in) long. It is bilaterally symmetric, with a mouth and anus located ventrally and distally along its body.

== Biology ==
Lovenia cordiformis can be found on or buried in the sea floor at depths of up to 200 m (660 ft) below the surface. It feeds on detritus. Fertilization of the species occurs externally, with eggs held on the peristome, around the periproct, or on the petaloids. Lovenia cordiformis live as planktotrophic larvae for several months before sinking to the sea floor and developing into adult sea urchins.
