= Breynia neanika =

Scientific classification
- Kingdom: Animalia
- Phylum: Echinodermata
- Class: Echinoidea
- Order: Spatangoida
- Family: Loveniidae
- Genus: Breynia
- Species: B. neanika

Binomial name
- Breynia neanika McNamara, 1982

Species of sea urchin

Breynia neanika is a species of sea urchins of the family Loveniidae. Their armour is covered with spines. Breynia neanika was first scientifically described in 1982 by McNamara.
