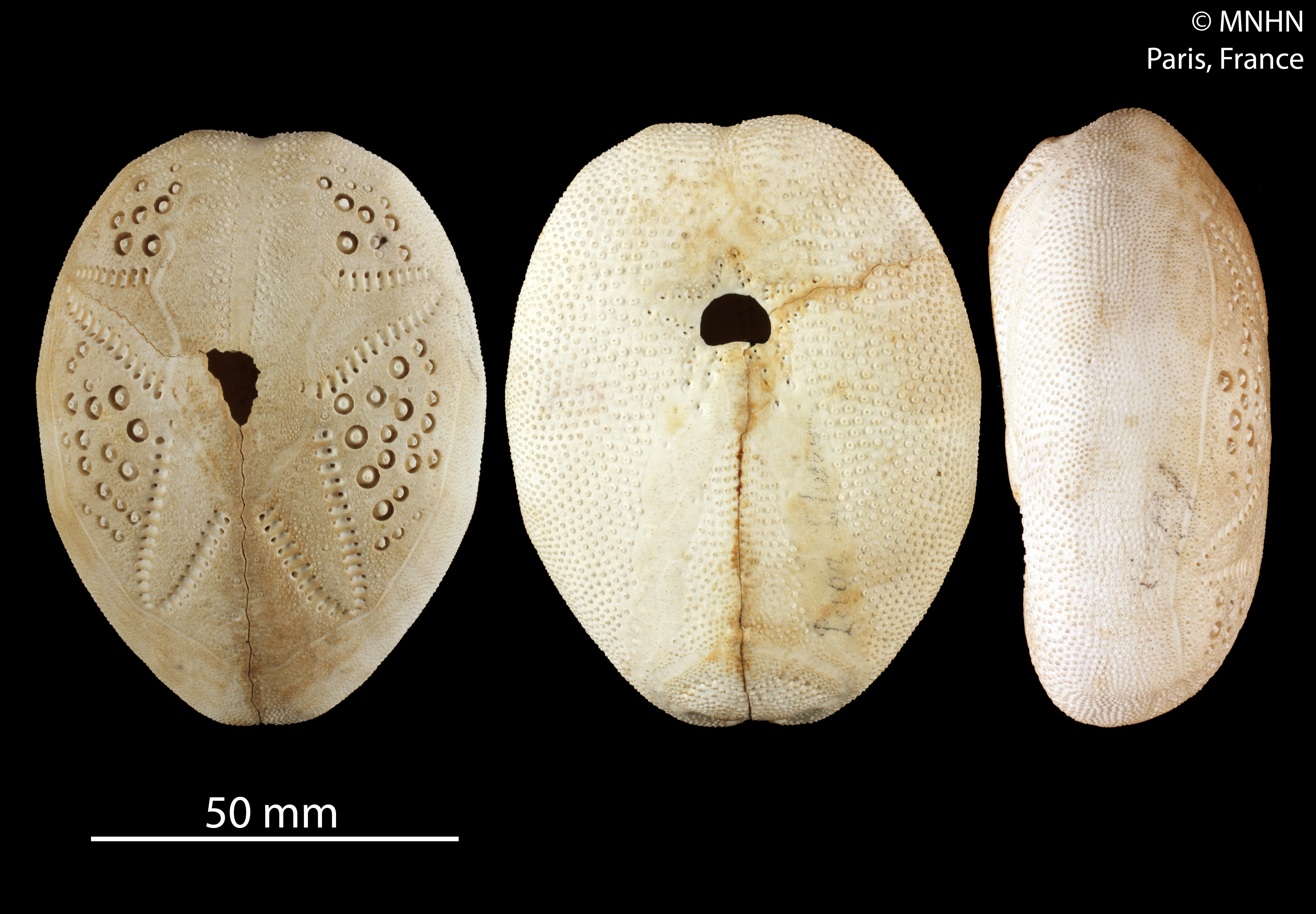

Scientific classification
- Kingdom: Animalia
- Phylum: Echinodermata
- Class: Echinoidea
- Order: Spatangoida
- Family: Loveniidae
- Genus: Breynia
- Species: B. australasiae

Binomial name
- Breynia australasiae (Leach, 1815)

= Breynia australasiae =

Species of sea urchin

Breynia australasiae is a species of sea urchins of the family Loveniidae, most commonly referred to as a heart urchin. Their armour is covered with spines. Breynia australasiae was first scientifically described in 1815 by Leach. This species is extremely common within the lagoon at Lord Howe I, although rarely sighted by divers along the New South Wales mainland. They grow up to 12 centimeters in length and can be found in waters of 0 to 10 meters deep.
