= Urothoe marina =

Scientific classification
- Kingdom: Animalia
- Phylum: Arthropoda
- Clade: Pancrustacea
- Class: Malacostraca
- Order: Amphipoda
- Family: Urothoidae
- Genus: Urothoe
- Species: U. marina

Binomial name
- Urothoe marina (Bate, 1857)

Synonyms
- U. pectina Grube, 1868; U. pectinatus Grube, 1868

Species of crustacean

Urothoe marina is a species of small marine amphipod crustaceans in the family Urothoidae. It is found on and burrowing in coarse sediments in shallow coastal waters off northwestern Europe.

== Description ==
Urothoe marina is about 8 millimetres (0.3 in) long, crescent-shaped and a yellowish-white colour. It is laterally compressed and normally lies on one side. The head is fused with the thorax and bears two unequal sized antennae. In the male, the lower antenna is as long as the body but in the female, it is only just longer than the upper one. The upper antenna has a short side branch. The stalked eyes are black. Those of the male are very large while the female has smaller, oval eyes. The thorax consists of eight somites each with its own appendages and some setae. The posterior pereiopods are wider than they are long and have feathery setae. The uropods are densely hairy and the short telson has a single spine and a few setae.

== Distribution ==
Urothoe marina occurs off the coasts of northwest Europe. Its range includes the North Sea, the English Channel and the Atlantic Ocean from the Shetland Isles southwards to the Bay of Biscay. It is usually found in the neritic zone and at depths of up to 200 metres (660 ft).

== Reproduction ==
Urothoe marina becomes sexually mature at about five months old and may live for a year. The sexes are distinct and breeding takes place between April and October. Fertilisation is internal and there are about fifteen eggs, with batches produced every fifteen days or so. The eggs are brooded rather than being liberated into the water column and the juveniles grow rapidly. Biological dispersal of this species is very limited.

== Ecology ==
The back three legs of U. marina have flattened joints and are used for digging and it can quickly disappear into the substrate. It is often found in association with the sea potato (Echinocardium cordatum), making use of its burrow as a refuge. It also found in association with members of the sea cucumber family, Synaptidae.
