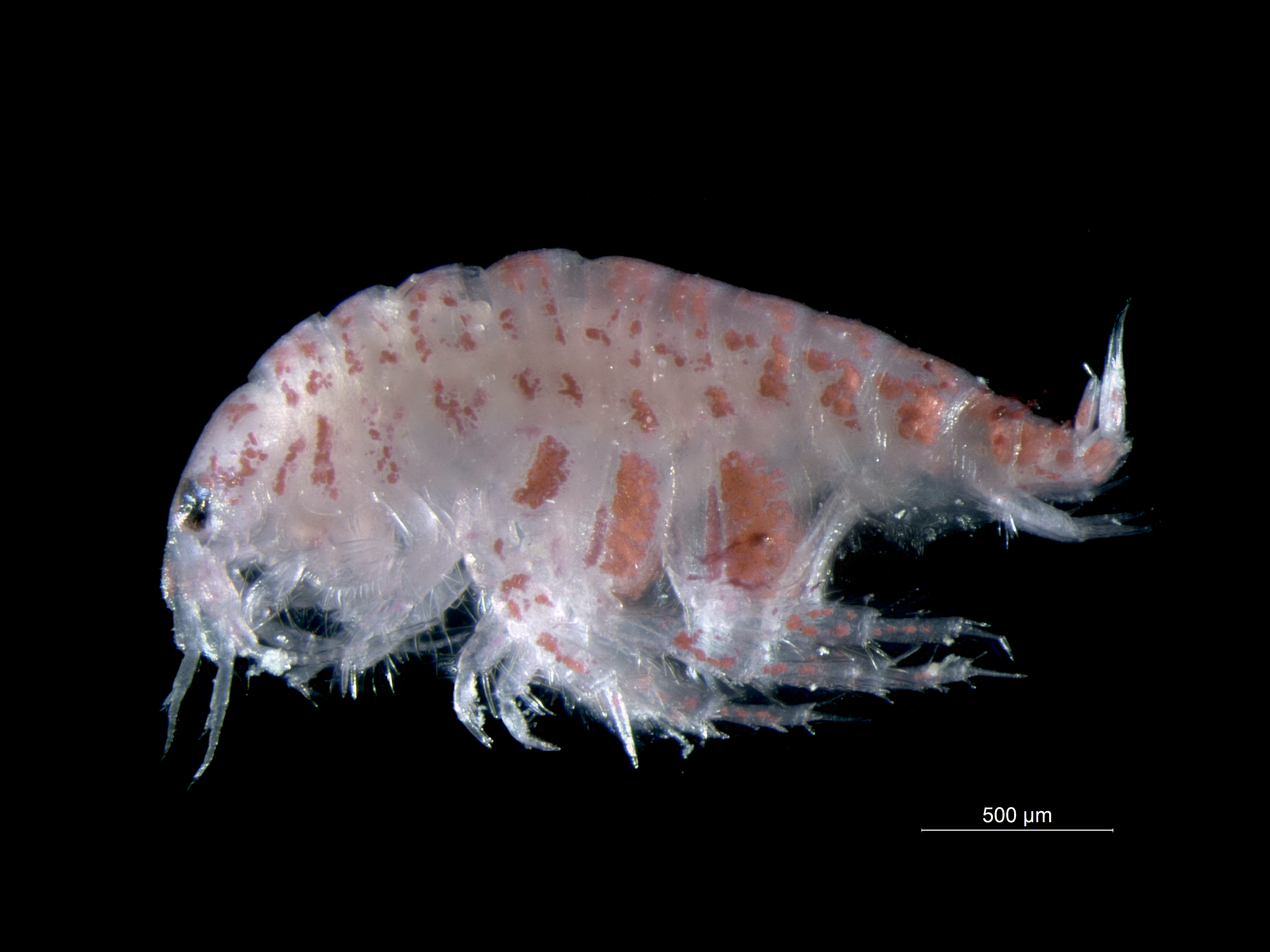

Scientific classification
- Kingdom: Animalia
- Phylum: Arthropoda
- Clade: Pancrustacea
- Class: Malacostraca
- Order: Amphipoda
- Family: Urothoidae
- Genus: Urothoe
- Species: U. elegans

Binomial name
- Urothoe elegans (Bate, 1857)

Synonyms
- Gammarus elegans (Mihi); Urothoe abbreviata G. O. Sars, 1879; Urothoe norvegica Boeck, 1861

= Urothoe elegans =

Species of crustacean

Urothoe elegans is a species of very small marine amphipod crustaceans in the family Urothoidae. It was first described from Plymouth.
