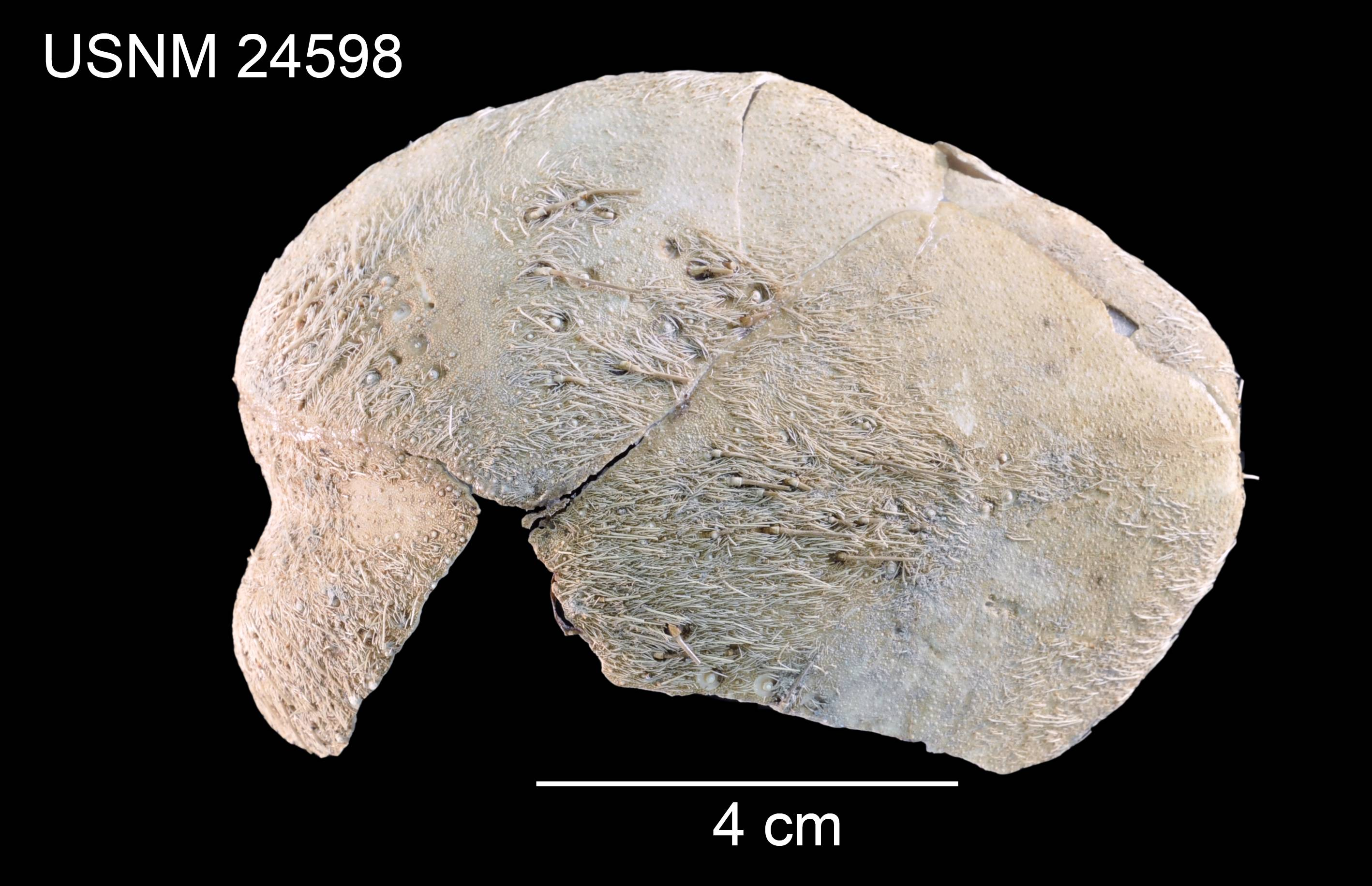

Scientific classification
- Kingdom: Animalia
- Phylum: Echinodermata
- Class: Echinoidea
- Order: Spatangoida
- Family: Loveniidae
- Genus: Araeolampas
- Species: A. atlantica

Binomial name
- Araeolampas atlantica Serafy, 1974

= Araeolampas atlantica =

Species of sea urchin

Araeolampas atlantica is a species of sea urchin of the family Loveniidae. Their armour is covered with spines. It is placed in the genus Araeolampas and lives in the sea. Araeolampas atlantica was first scientifically described in 1974 by K. Serafy.
