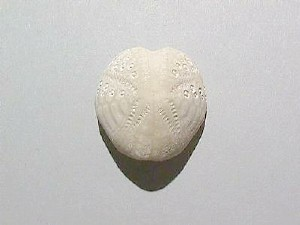
- †Lovenia woodsi

Scientific classification
- Kingdom: Animalia
- Phylum: Echinodermata
- Class: Echinoidea
- Order: Spatangoida
- Family: Loveniidae
- Genus: Lovenia; Gray, 1825

Species
- See text

= Lovenia =

Genus of sea urchins

Lovenia is a genus of sea urchin that is the sister taxon to Breynia and Echinocardium.

Lovenia kerneri was described in 2020 from the Pliocene Tamiami Formation in Florida.

It is the first documented Lovenia from the Eastern United States and the largest as well as the latest member of this genus known from the Eastern America/Caribbean region.

== Species ==
- †L. aegyptiaca (Fourtau, 1920); Upper Miocene, Egypt.
- L. Desor, Agassiz & Desor, 1847, Oligocene to Recent.
- †L. bagheerae Irwin & Archbold, 1994; Miocene (Tortonian), southern Australia.
- L. camarota Clark, 1917; Recent, North Australia.
- L. cordiformis Agassiz, 1872; Recent, West coast of America.
- L. doederleini Mortensen, 1950; Recent, Malay region.
- †L. elongata (Gray, 1845); Miocene to Recent, Indo-West Pacific.
- †L. forbesii (Tenison Woods, 1862); Lower to Middle Miocene, Australia.
- L. gregalis Alcock, 1893; Recent, Indo-West Pacific.
- L. grisea Agassiz & Clark, 1907; Recent, Hawaii.
- L. hawaiiensis Mortensen, 1950; Recent, Hawaii.
- L. hemphilli (Israesky)
- †L. mortenseni Ctyoky, 1965; Middle Miocene, Czech Republic.
- †L. sulcata (Haime, 1853); Lower Oligocene, France.
- L. subcarinata (Gray, 1845); Recent, Indo-West Pacific.
- L. trifolis (Koehler, 1914); Recent, Indo-West Pacific.
- †L. woodsii (Etheridge, 1875); Lower to Middle Miocene, Australia.
