= Breynia vredenburgi =

Scientific classification
- Kingdom: Animalia
- Phylum: Echinodermata
- Class: Echinoidea
- Order: Spatangoida
- Family: Loveniidae
- Genus: Breynia
- Species: B. vredenburgi

Binomial name
- Breynia vredenburgi Anderson, 1907

Species of sea urchin

Breynia vredenburgi is a species of sea urchins of the family Loveniidae. Their armour is covered with spines. Breynia vredenburgi was first scientifically described in 1907 by Anderson.
