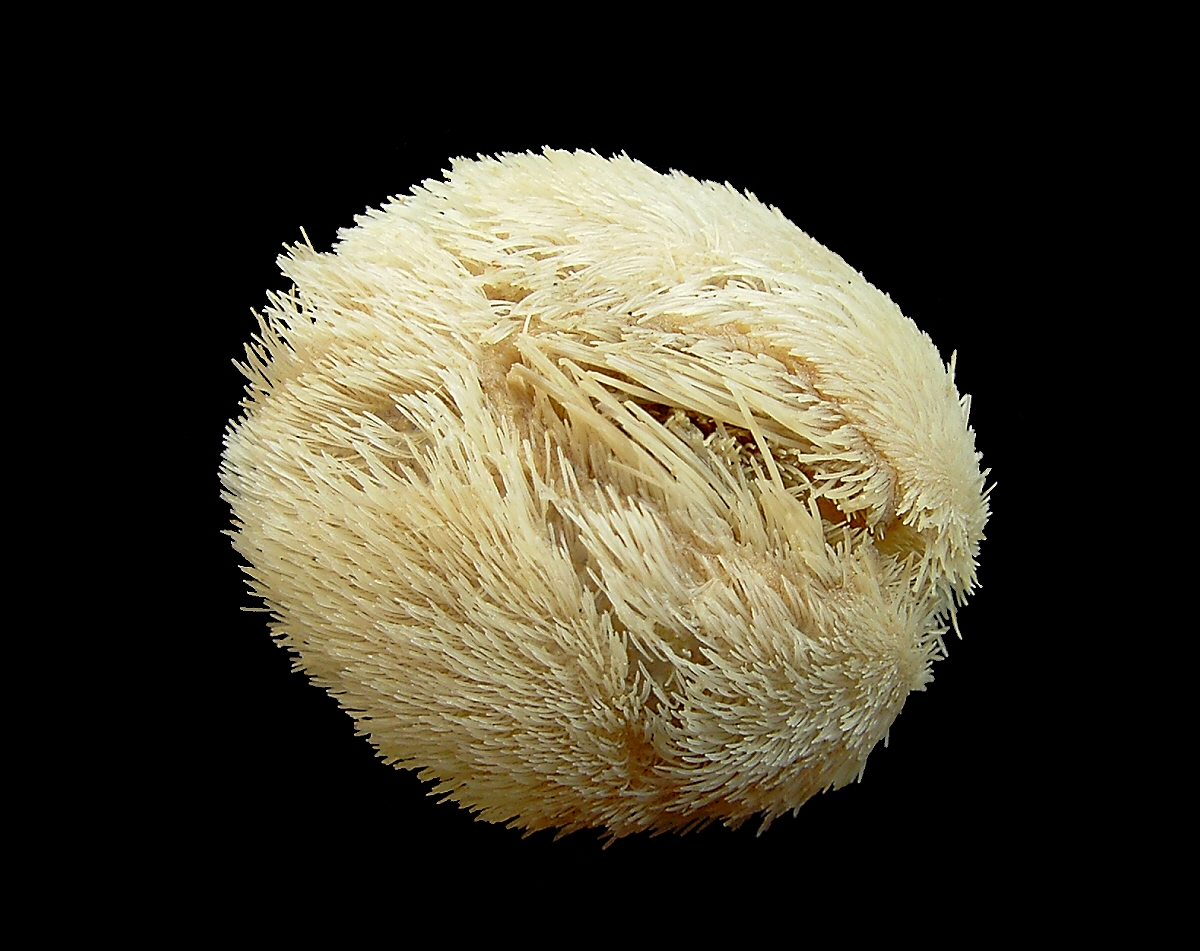
- Echinocardium cordatum

Scientific classification
- Kingdom: Animalia
- Phylum: Echinodermata
- Class: Echinoidea
- Order: Spatangoida
- Family: Loveniidae
- Genus: Echinocardium; J. E. Gray, 1825

Species
- See text.

Synonyms
- Amphidetus Agassiz, 1836

= Echinocardium =

Genus of sea urchins

Echinocardium is a genus of sea urchins of the family Loveniidae, known as heart urchins. The name is derived from the Greek ἐχῖνος (echinos, "hedgehog, urchin") and καρδία (kardia, "heart").

== Taxonomy ==
The genus was first described in 1825 by John Edward Gray, and the type species is Spatangus pusillus Leske, 1778 by subsequent designation.

In 1836, the genus Amphidetus was described by Louis Agassiz, and is now considered a synonym of Echinocardium.

== Species ==
- Echinocardium australe Gray, 1855
- Echinocardium cordatum (Pennant, 1777)
- Echinocardium fenauxi Péquignat, 1963
- Echinocardium flavescens (Müller, 1776)
- Echinocardium gibbosus Agassiz & Desor, 1847
- Echinocardium intermedium Mortensen, 1907
- Echinocardium laevigaster Agassiz
- Echinocardium mediterraneum (Forbes, 1844)
- Echinocardium mortenseni Thiéry, 1909
- Echinocardium pennatifidum Norman, 1868
- Echinocardium sebae Gray

== Sources ==
- "Echinocardium". Integrated Taxonomic Information System.
- MarBEF Data System - ERMS - Echinocardium Gray, 1825
