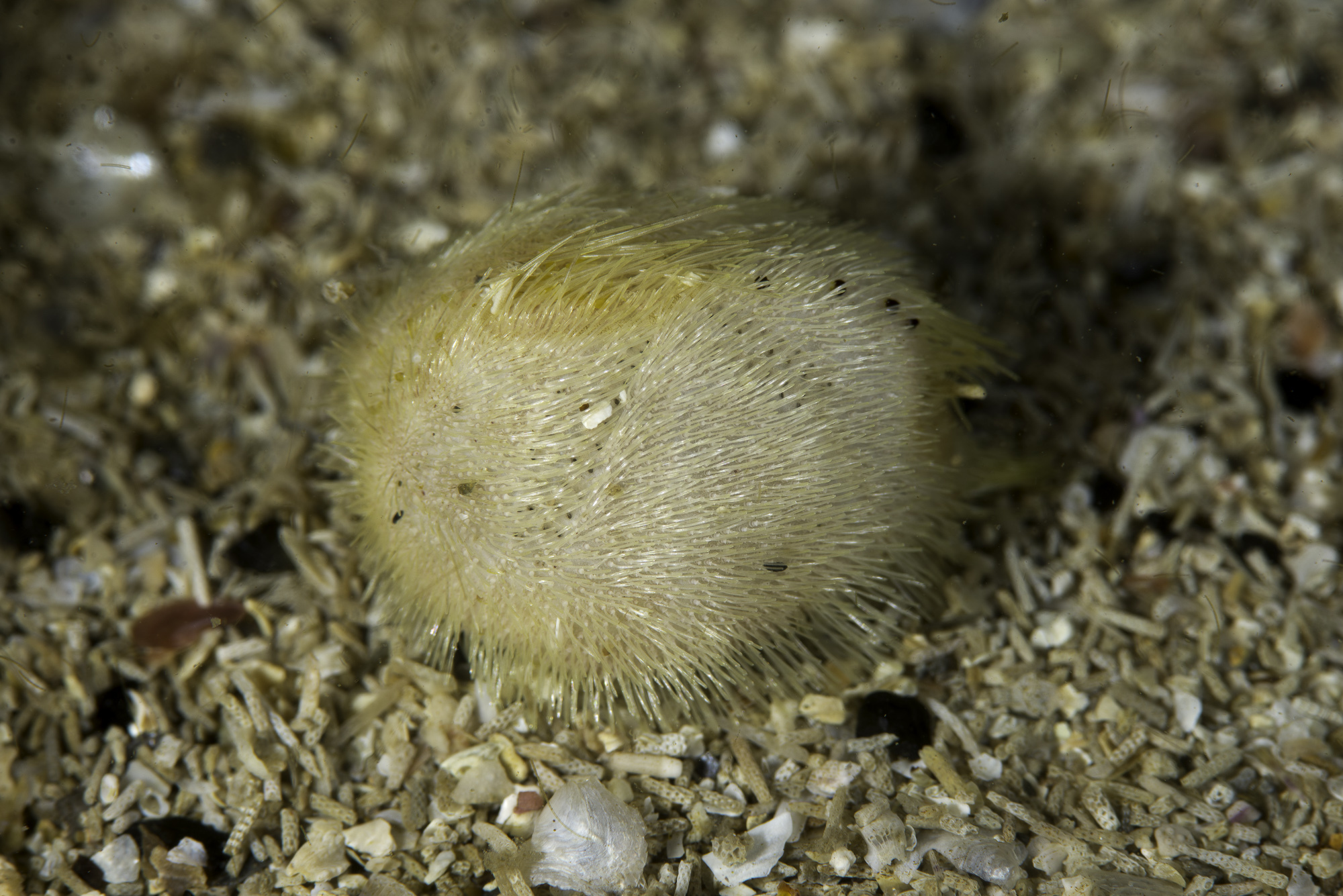
- Specimen recorded off the Isle of Man

Scientific classification
- Kingdom: Animalia
- Phylum: Echinodermata
- Class: Echinoidea
- Order: Spatangoida
- Family: Loveniidae
- Genus: Echinocardium
- Species: E. flavescens

Binomial name
- Echinocardium flavescens O. F. Müller, 1776

Synonyms
- Amphidetus flavescens (O.F. Müller, 1776); Amphidetus ovatus (Leske, 1778); Amphidetus roseus (Forbes, 1841); Amphidotus roseus Forbes, 1841; Echinocardium ovatum Gray, 1848; Echinocardium Ravescens; Spatagus flavescens O.F. Müller, 1776; Spatangus ouatus Leske, 1778; Spatangus ovatus Leske, 1778

= Echinocardium flavescens =

Species of sea urchin

Echinocardium flavescens, sometimes called the yellow sea potato, is a species of sea urchin in the family Loveniidae, chiefly found in the northeast Atlantic region.

== Description ==
Echinocardium flavescens is about 5 cm (2.0 in) long. It is yellow to the tube feet (hence the name flavescens, "yellowish") and has spines on the underside of the body. The frontal ambulacrum is not indented and there are larger spines in the interambulacral areas of the upper side of the test. Its labrum is long, reaching the second pair of ambulacral plates.

== Distribution ==
Found in the waters off Great Britain, Ireland and associated islands.

== Biology ==
Matures in early summer.

== Ecology ==
Echinocardium flavescens buries itself about 4 in (100 mm) deep in coarse gravel in the sublittoral, up to depths of 200 m (660 ft), sometimes associated with the sea cucumber Neopentadactyla mixta or the brittle star Ophiopsila annulosa.
