= Urothoides =

Scientific classification
- Kingdom: Animalia
- Phylum: Arthropoda
- Clade: Pancrustacea
- Class: Malacostraca
- Order: Amphipoda
- Family: Urothoidae
- Genus: Urothoides; Stebbing, 1891

Genus of crustaceans

Urothoides is a genus of amphipod crustaceans, in the family Urothoidae. Members of this genus live at depths from 2.5 to 4,564 meters (8 to 14,974 ft) below the surface, with about 202 occurrences.

== Species ==
Placed by WoRMS.

- Urothoides inops J.L. Barnard, 1967
- Urothoides kurrawa Barnard & Drummond, 1979
- Urothoides lachneessa (Stebbing, 1888)
- Urothoides mabingi Barnard & Drummond, 1979
- Urothoides makoo Barnard & Drummond, 1979
- Urothoides mammarta Barnard & Drummond, 1979
- Urothoides odernae Barnard & Drummond, 1979
- Urothoides pseudodernae Ledoyer, 1984
- Urothoides tondea Barnard & Drummond, 1979
- Urothoides waminoa Barnard & Drummond, 1979
