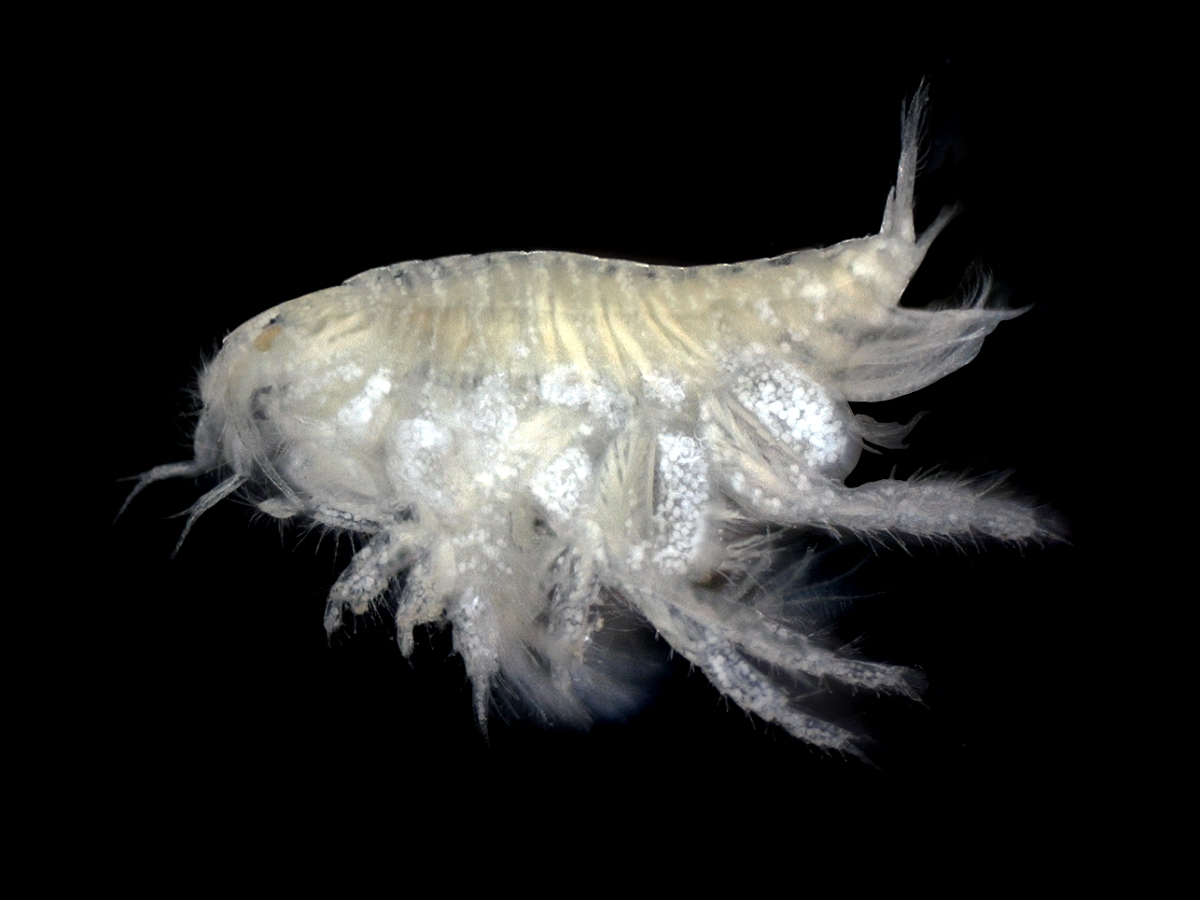
- Urothoe brevicornis
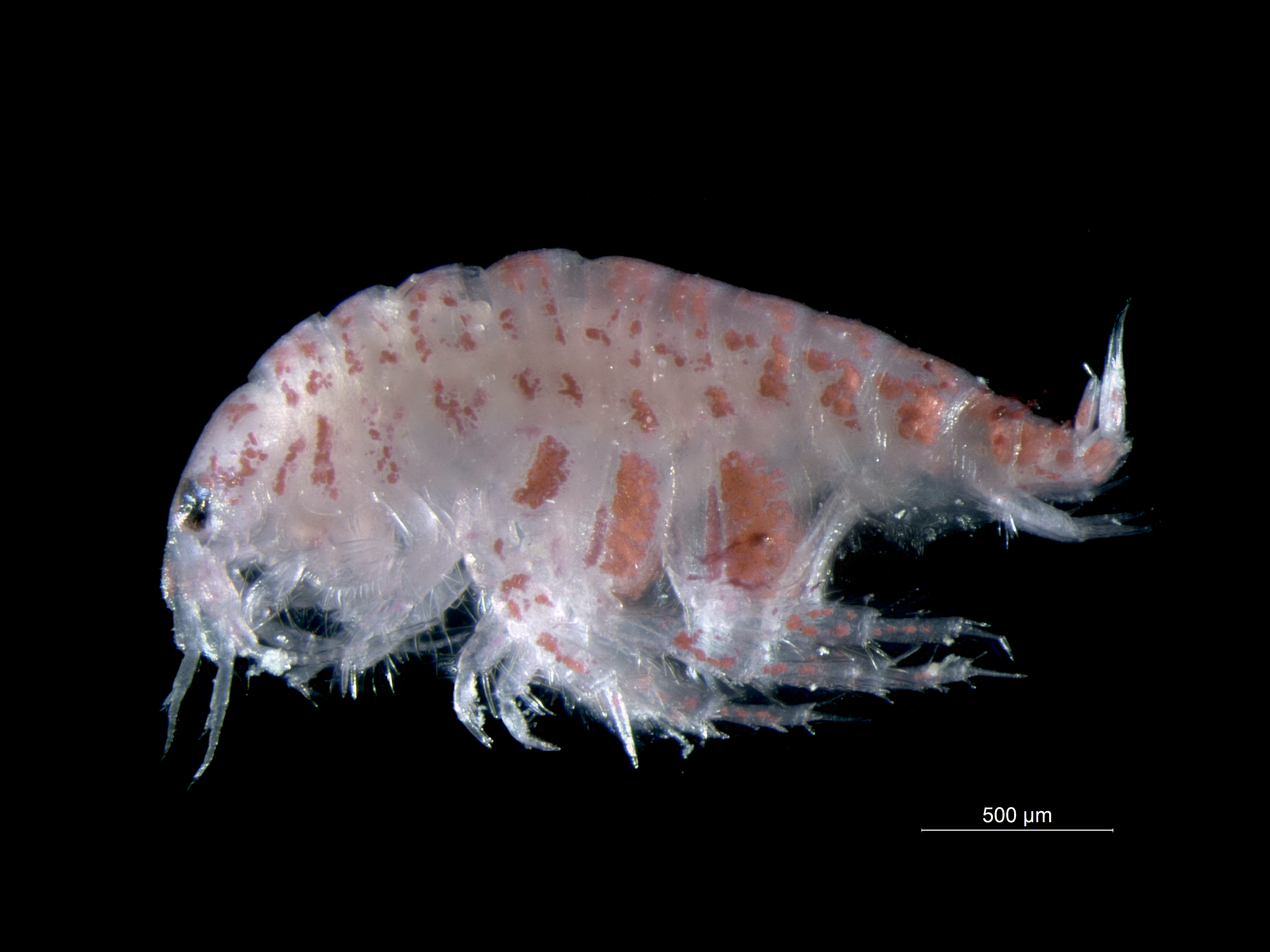
- Urothoe elegans

Scientific classification
- Kingdom: Animalia
- Phylum: Arthropoda
- Clade: Pancrustacea
- Class: Malacostraca
- Order: Amphipoda
- Family: Urothoidae
- Genus: Urothoe; Dana, 1852

Type species
- Urothoe irrostratus Dana, 1852

= Urothoe =

Genus of crustaceans

Urothoe is a genus of very small marine amphipod crustaceans in the family Urothoidae. Members of the genus are found worldwide.

== Biology ==
Urothods are 5–8 millimetres (0.2–0.3 in) long and live on the sea bed or in shallow burrows in gravelly substrates or muddy sand. They can swim for short distances. They are vulnerable to dredging but are able to recover afterwards and re-establish their burrows. They are deposit feeders and also selectively scrape microorganisms from grains of sand.

== Reproduction ==
Urothoe reaches sexual maturity at five months and may live for about a year. The sexes are distinct and breeding takes place in the summer months. Fertilisation is internal and there are about fifteen eggs per brood, produced in a cycle of about fifteen days. Fecundity is high and the juveniles grow fast but biological dispersal is very limited.

== Species ==
Urothoe contains the following species:

- Urothoe atlantica Bellan-Santini & Menioui, 2004
- Urothoe bairdii Bate, 1862
- Urothoe brevicornis Bate, 1862
- Urothoe carda Imbach, 1969
- Urothoe chosani Hirayama, 1992
- Urothoe convexa Kim & Kim, 1991
- Urothoe corsica Bellan-Santini, 1965
- Urothoe coxalis Griffiths, 1974
- Urothoe cuspis Imbach, 1969
- Urothoe dentata Schellenberg, 1925
- Urothoe denticulata Gurjanova, 1951
- Urothoe elegans (Bate, 1857)
- Urothoe elizae Cooper & Fincham, 1974
- Urothoe falcata Schellenberg, 1931
- Urothoe femoralis K. H. Barnard, 1955
- Urothoe gelasina Imbach, 1969
- Urothoe grimaldii Chevreux, 1895
- Urothoe hesperiae Conradi, Lopez-Gonzalez & Bellan-Santini, 1997
- Urothoe intermedia Bellan-Santini & Ruffo, 1986
- Urothoe irrostratus Dana, 1852
- Urothoe latifrons Ren, 1991
- Urothoe marina (Bate, 1857)
- Urothoe marionis Bellan-Santini & Ledoyer, 1987
- Urothoe oniscoides (K. H. Barnard, 1932)
- Urothoe orientalis Gurjanova, 1938
- Urothoe pestai Spandl, 1923
- Urothoe pinnata K. H. Barnard, 1955
- Urothoe platydactyla Rabindranath, 1971
- Urothoe platypoda Griffiths, 1974
- Urothoe poseidonis Reibish, 1905
- Urothoe poucheti Chevreux, 1888
- Urothoe pulchella (Costa, 1853)
- Urothoe rotundifrons J. L. Barnard, 1962
- Urothoe ruber Giles, 1888
- Urothoe serrulidactylus K. H Barnard, 1955
- Urothoe spinidigitata Walker, 1904
- Urothoe tumorosa Griffiths, 1974
- Urothoe varvarini Gurjanova, 1953
- Urothoe vemae J.L. Barnard, 1962
- Urothoe viswanathi Asari, 1998
- Urothoe wellingtonensis Cooper, 1974
