= J. Laurens Barnard =

American marine zoologist

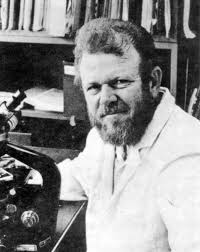
- Born: February 27, 1928; Pasadena, California
- Died: August 16, 1991 (aged 63); Ramrod Key, Florida
- Other name: Jerry Laurens Barnard
- Education: Pasadena Junior College, University of Southern California
- Spouse: Charline Barnard
- Scientific career
- Fields: Amphipoda, Crustacea, Invertebrates
- Workplaces: University of Southern California, Beaudette Foundation for Biological Research, National Museum of Natural History, Bishop Museum, New Zealand Oceanographic Institute, Western Australian Museum, University of Arizona
- Thesis: The Wood Boring Habits of Chelura terebrans Philippi in Los Angeles Harbor (1953)
- Doctoral advisor: J. W. Mohr

J. Laurens Barnard (also known as Jerry Laurens Barnard; February 27, 1928 – August 16, 1991) was an American zoologist, taxonomist, and carcinologist. He contributed to the field of amphipod taxonomy.
