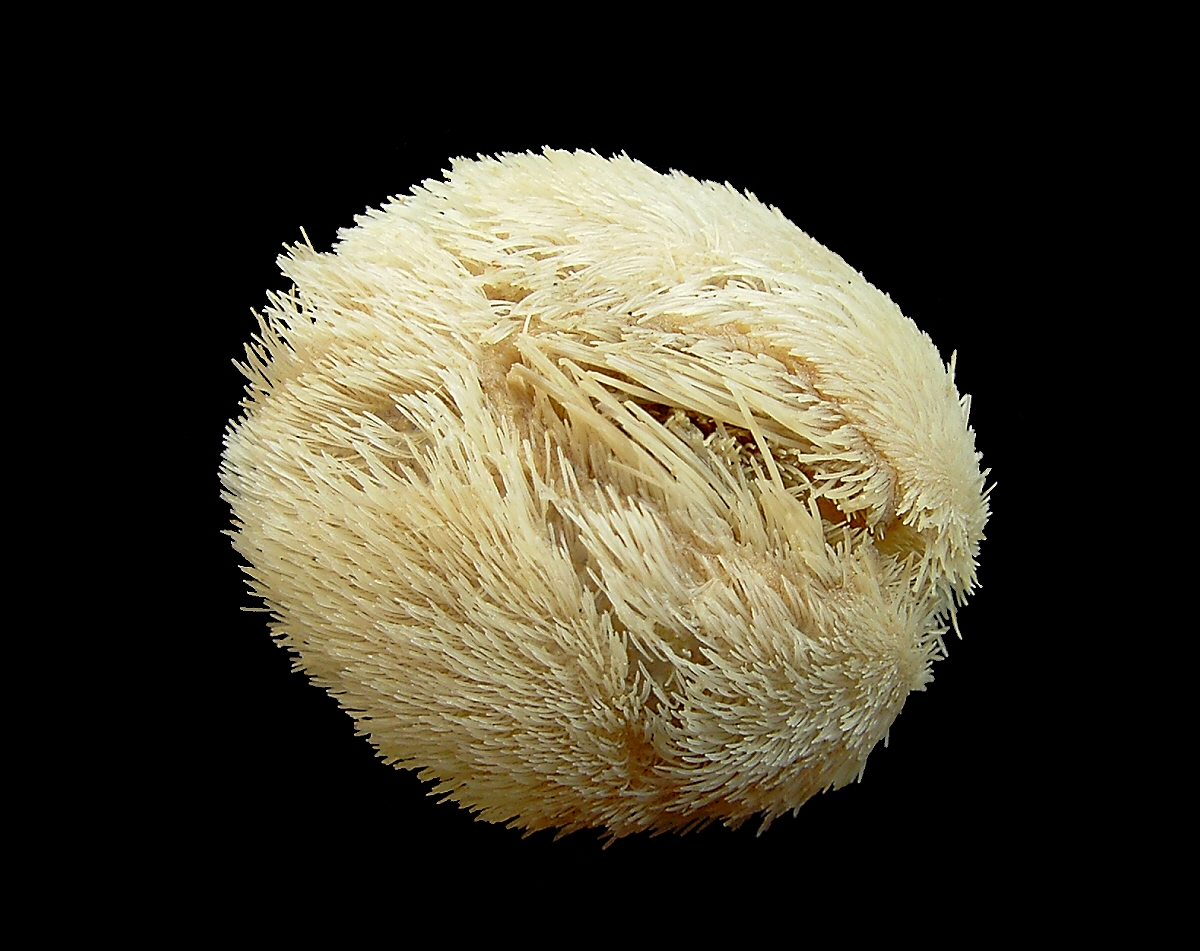
- Belgian continental shelf specimen

Scientific classification
- Kingdom: Animalia
- Phylum: Echinodermata
- Class: Echinoidea
- Order: Spatangoida
- Family: Loveniidae
- Genus: Echinocardium
- Species: E. cordatum

Binomial name
- Echinocardium cordatum (Pennant, 1777)

Synonyms
- Amphidetus cordatus (Pennant, 1777); Amphidetus kurtzii Girard, 1852; Amphidetus Kürtzii Girard, 1852; Amphidetus novae zealandiae Perrier, 1869; Amphidetus novaezealandiae Perrier, 1869; Amphidetus zealandicus (Gray, 1851); Echinocardium australe Gray, 1851; Echinocardium cordatus (Pennant, 1777); Echinocardium kurtzii (Girard, 1852); Echinocardium sebae Gray, 1825; Echinocardium stimpsonii A. Agassiz, 1863; Echinocardium zealandicum Gray, 1851; Echinus cordatum Pennant, 1777; Echinus cordatus Pennant, 1777; Spatangus arcuarius Lamarck, 1816; Spatangus cordatus (Pennant, 1777)

= Echinocardium cordatum =

Species of sea urchin

Echinocardium cordatum, also known as the common heart urchin or the sea potato, is a sea urchin in the family Loveniidae. It is found in subtidal regions in temperate seas throughout the world. It lives buried in the sandy sea floor.

== Description ==
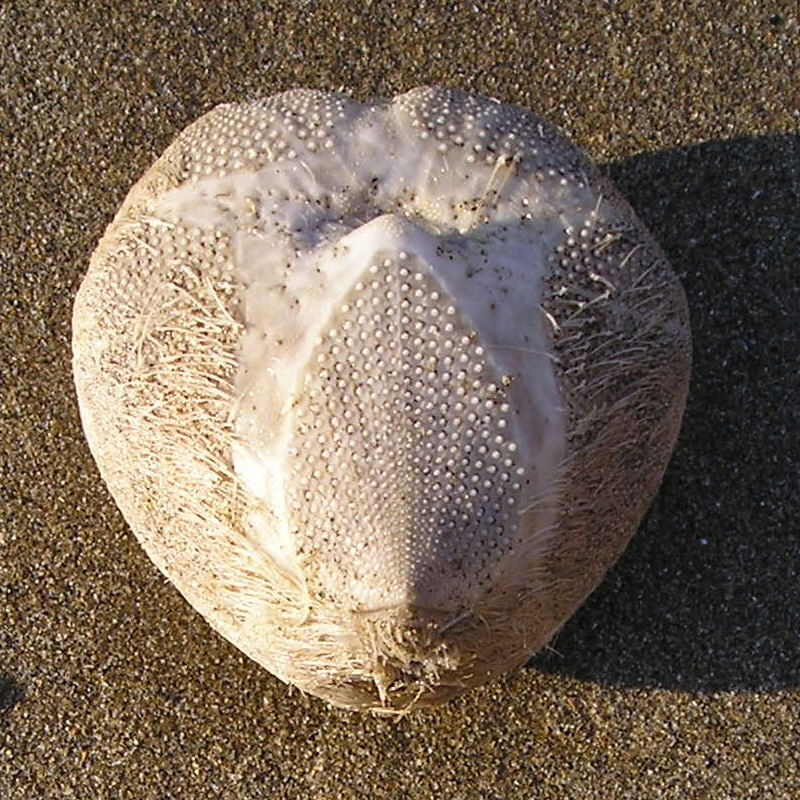
Specimen with many spines missing, displaying the test (shell)

The sea potato is a heart-shaped urchin clothed in a dense mat of furrowed yellowish spines which grow from tubercles and mostly point backwards. The upper surface is flattened and there is an indentation near the front. This urchin is a fawn colour but the tests that are found on the strandline have often lost their spines and are white. During life, the spines trap air which helps prevent asphyxiation for the buried urchin. The ambulacra form a broad furrow in a star shape extending down the sides of the test. There are two series each of two rows of tube feet. The test reaches from six to nine centimetres in length.

== Taxonomy ==
The species was first described as Echinus cordatum in 1777 by Thomas Pennant. It has subsequently been synonymised with Echinocardium sebae Gray, 1825, Spatangus arcuarius Lamarck, 1816, Echinocardium australe Gray, 1851, Echinocardium stimpsonii A. Agassiz, 1864, Echinocardium zealandicum Gray, 1851, Amphidetus novaezelandiae Perrier, 1869, and Amphidetus kurtzii Girard, 1852.

== Distribution ==
The sea potato has a discontinuous cosmopolitan distribution. It is reported from temperate seas in the north Atlantic Ocean, the west Pacific Ocean, around Australia, New Zealand, South Africa and the Gulf of California at depths of down to 230 metres. A 2016 study revealed that it was a complex of at least 5 species, with three in Europe, one in Australia and one in the NW Pacific. It is very common round the coasts of the British Isles in the neritic zone.

== Biology ==
The sea potato buries itself in sand to a depth of ten to fifteen centimetres. It occurs in sediments with a wide range of grain sizes but prefers sediments with a size of 200 to 300 μm and a low mud content. It makes a respiratory channel leading to the surface and two sanitary channels behind itself, all lined by a mucus secretion. The location of burrows can be recognised by a conical depression on the surface in which detritus collects. This organic debris is used by the buried animal as food and is passed down by means of the long tube feet found in the front of the ambulacrum.

Like most other urchins, male and female sea potatoes reproduce via broadcast spawning, meaning that they release gametes directly into the water column, where fertilization occurs. The echinoplutei larvae that develop after fertilisation have four pairs of arms and are laterally flattened. In late stage larvae, tube feet may be seen developing round the skeleton. The larvae are pelagic and form part of the zooplankton. Metamorphosis takes place about 39 days after fertilisation with the larvae settling out and burrowing into the substrate. The lifespan of the sea potato is thought to be ten or more years.

== Ecology ==
In the sandy sea bed that it favours, the sea potato is often found in association with the bivalve molluscs Tellina fabula, Ensis ensis and Venus striatula.

The bivalve Tellimya ferruginosa is often found living inside the sea potato's burrow as a commensal. Up to fourteen have been found in one burrow with the young being attached to the spines of the urchin by byssus threads. Another species that makes use of the burrow is the amphipod crustacean, Urothoe marina.

== Gallery ==
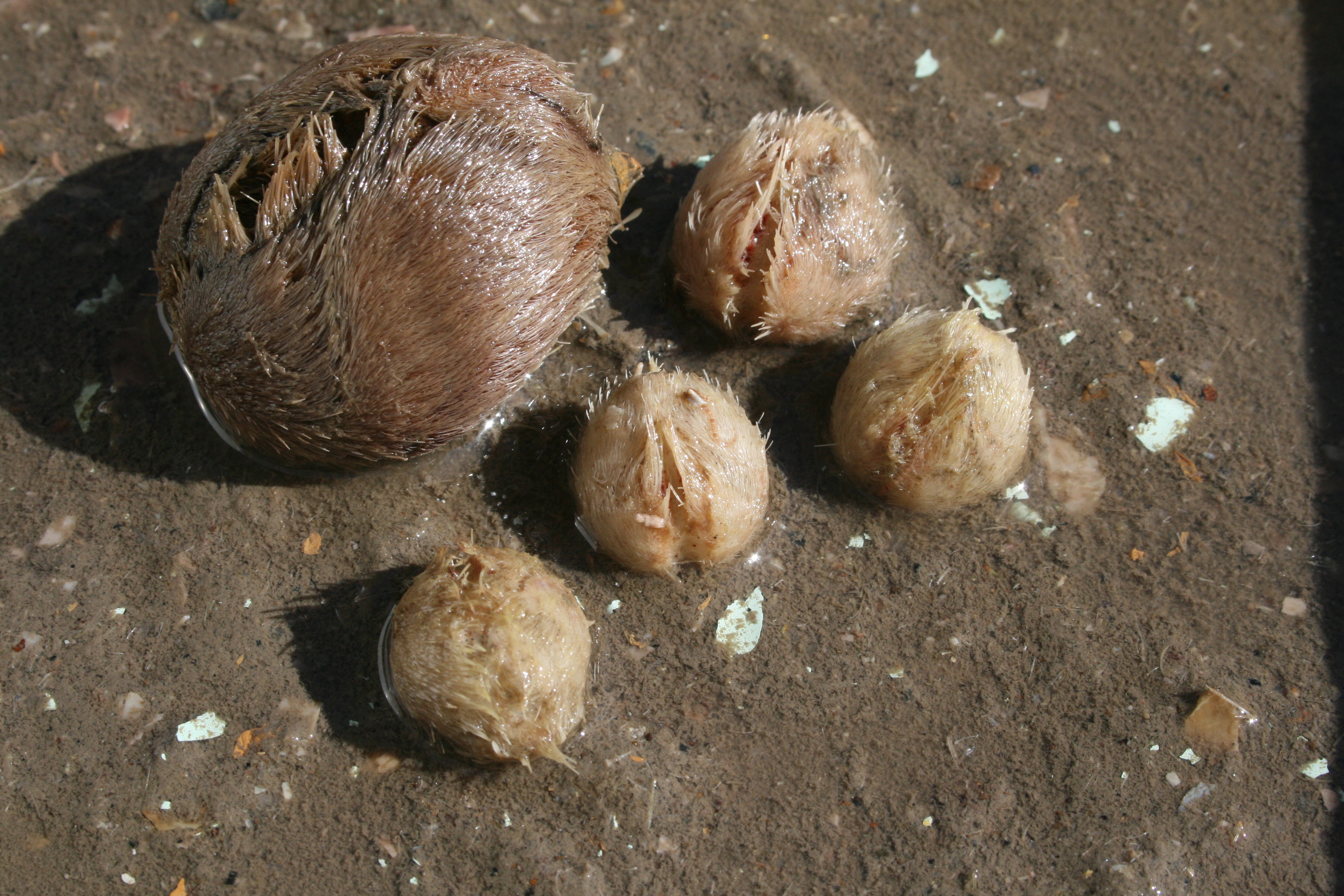

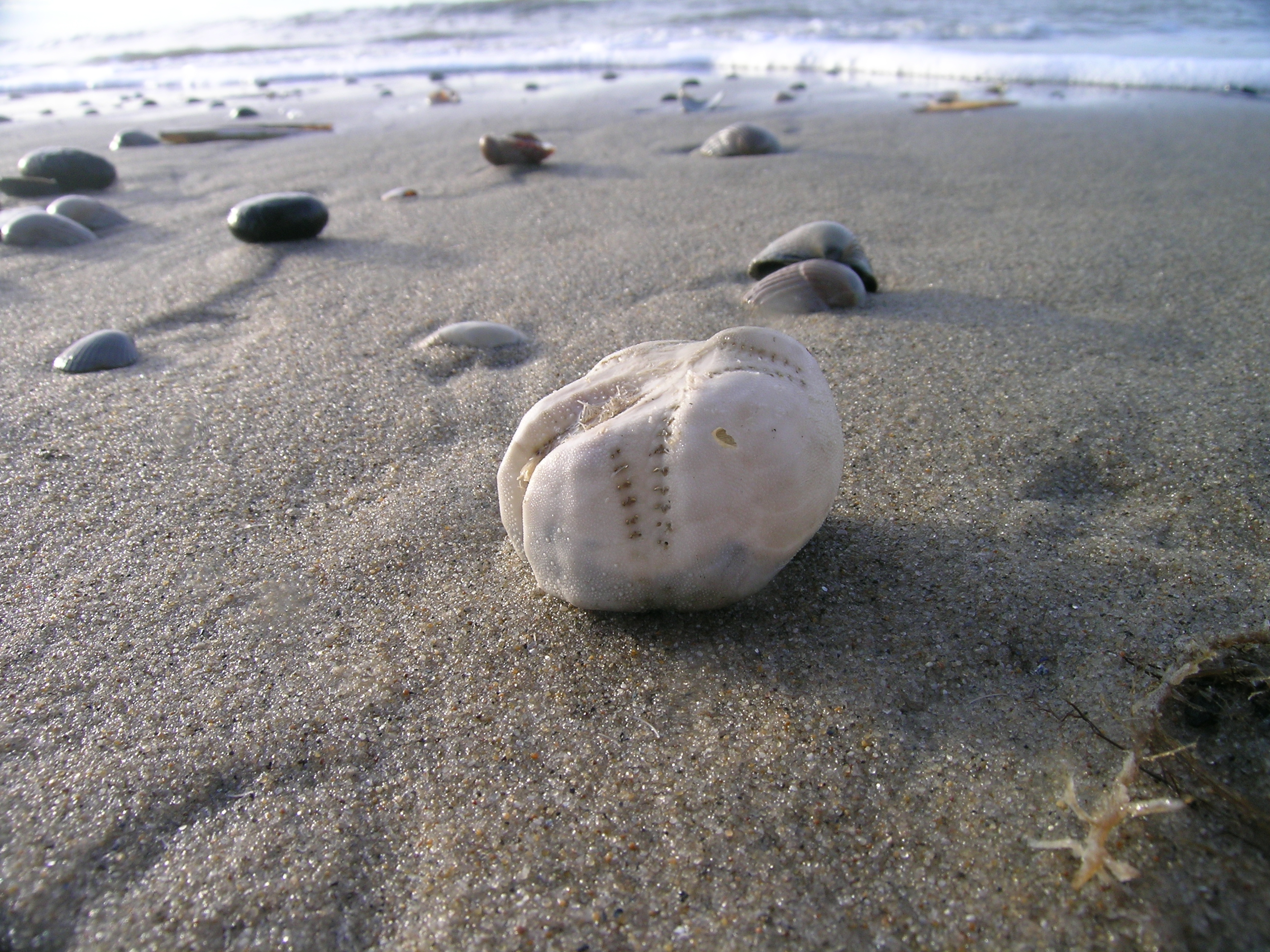

== In culture ==
The test (shell) of the sea potato has cultural significance in West Cork, Ireland, where it is traditionally referred to as a "Virgin Mary" shell. According to traditional belief, the distinct patterns visible on the test are thought to resemble an apparition of the Virgin Mary. There is also a traditional association between the appearance of the shells on beaches in West Cork and the Marian month of May and the Feast of the Assumption.
