= Alfred Norman (cricketer) =

New Zealand cricketer

Personal information
- Full name: Alfred David Norman
- Born: 5 March 1885; Christchurch, New Zealand
- Died: 30 January 1963 (aged 77); Christchurch, New Zealand
- Batting: Left-handed

Domestic team information
- Years: Team
- 1907/08–1912/13: Canterbury

Career statistics
Competition	First-class
Matches	9
Runs scored	352
Batting average	22.00
100s/50s	0/1
Top score	68
Catches/stumpings	0/0
- Source: Cricinfo, 28 January 2020

Alfred David Norman (5 March 1885 – 30 January 1963) was a New Zealand cricketer who played first-class cricket for Canterbury from 1908 to 1912.

Alf Norman was a left-handed opening batsman, described during his career as "a cool, reliable bat at all times". He made his highest first-class score of 68, the highest score of the match, when Canterbury beat Wellington by 322 runs in 1910–11. He was also the leading batsman in Christchurch senior club cricket that season, with 651 runs at an average of 65.10.

Norman married Margaret Logan in the Christchurch suburb of Sydenham in July 1911. They had four children; their daughter Mavis played cricket for Canterbury in the 1930s. He died in Christchurch on 30 January 1963.
