= Ambulacrum (zoology) =

Physiological characteristic of echinoderms

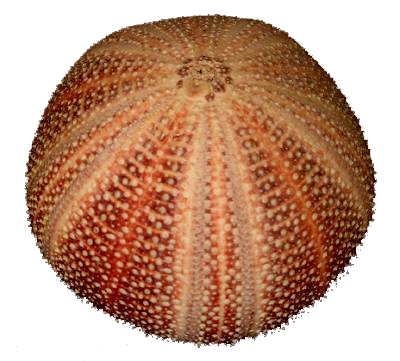
Sea urchin shell, or 'test'. Each white band is the location of a row of tube feet; each pair of white bands is called an ambulacrum There are five such ambulacra; the penta-radial symmetry reveals a kinship with sea stars.

In zoology, an ambulacrum is an elongated area of the shell of an echinoderm in which a row of tube feet are arranged. It is pluralized as ambulacra. The area on the shell between ambulacra is known as an interambulacrum.
