= Alfred Merle Norman =

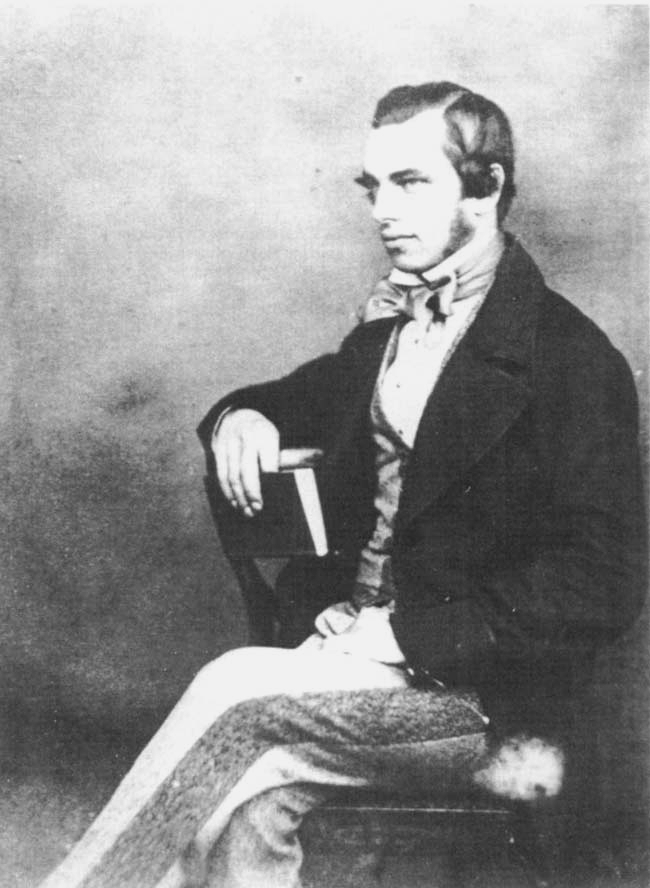
- c. 1852
- Born: 29 August 1831; Exeter, England
- Died: 26 October 1918 (aged 87); Berkhamsted, England
- Education: Christ Church, Oxford
- Awards: Linnean Medal (1906)
- Scientific career
- Fields: Naturalists

Alfred Merle Norman (29 August 1831 – 26 October 1918) was an English clergyman and naturalist.

== Biography ==
=== Early life ===
Norman was born in Exeter, England in 1831. His father was a landowner, surgeon and Deputy-Lieutenant of Somerset. He studied the molluscs and plants of Somerset at young age. He studied at Winchester College from 1844 to 1848. He then studied at Christ Church, Oxford and completed his B.A. in 1852. He received his M.A. from the University of Oxford in 1859.

=== Career ===
Norman became a private tutor to the Dowager Countess of Glasgow at Millport, Isle of Cumbrae. He then went to Wells Theological College and was ordained as a deacon in 1856. In the same year, he became curate of Kibworth Beauchamp, Leicestershire. He was ordained as a priest in 1857. In 1858, he was appointed as a curate in Sedgefield, County Durham.

Norman became curate of Houghton-le-Spring, County Durham in 1864. He held that position until 1866. In 1866 he became the first rector of a new parish at nearby Bournmoor and in 1867 chaplain to the second Earl of Durham. He became a Canon of Durham Cathedral in 1885. During his 29 years at Bournmoor he was involved with church matters and also with many scientific societies including the British Association for the Advancement of Science, the Conchological and Malacological Societies and the Museums Association. He was also a member of the Natural History Society of Northumberland and Durham.

=== Later life ===
Norman returned to Houghton-le-Spring as rector, and was given the additional appointment of Rural Dean in 1895. He retired in 1898 due to illness. He moved to Berkhamsted, Hertfordshire and lived there until his death. Even in his later years, he did research and published papers. He died on 25 October 1918 at the age of 87 and was buried in the grave of his mother in the churchyard of St Barnabas, Bournmoor.

== Work ==
Norman is known for publishing major work on Protozoa, Porifera, Coelenterata, mollusca, crustacea, echinodermata, and other invertebrates. The publication Museum Normanianum summarised his collection of 11,086 species, which was acquired by the Natural History Museum, London. They were purchased in four instalments between 1898 and 1911 by the Museum. Norman also presented many specimens to the Museum.

Norman published in excess of 200 papers. His early papers were on birds, insects, amphibians and fishes. Between 1857 and 1861, he published major work on molluscs of the Firth of Clyde and, between 1890 and 1899, he published important reviews of the Mollusca. His account in 1865 on some groups of British echinoderms was the first major contribution to these groups since Edward Forbes' British Starfishes of 1841.

In his later years, Norman published mainly about studies of marine and freshwater invertebrates. He published important studies on several groups of crustaceans, some in collaboration with other naturalists.

Norman's library, which incorporated John Gwyn Jeffreys' library on molluscs, is now in the Department of Zoology, University of Cambridge.

== Honours ==
Norman was elected a fellow of the Linnean Society of London in 1880. In 1883 he received an honorary DCL from the University of Durham. He was elected to the Royal Society in 1890. In 1906 he was awarded the Linnean Medal.
