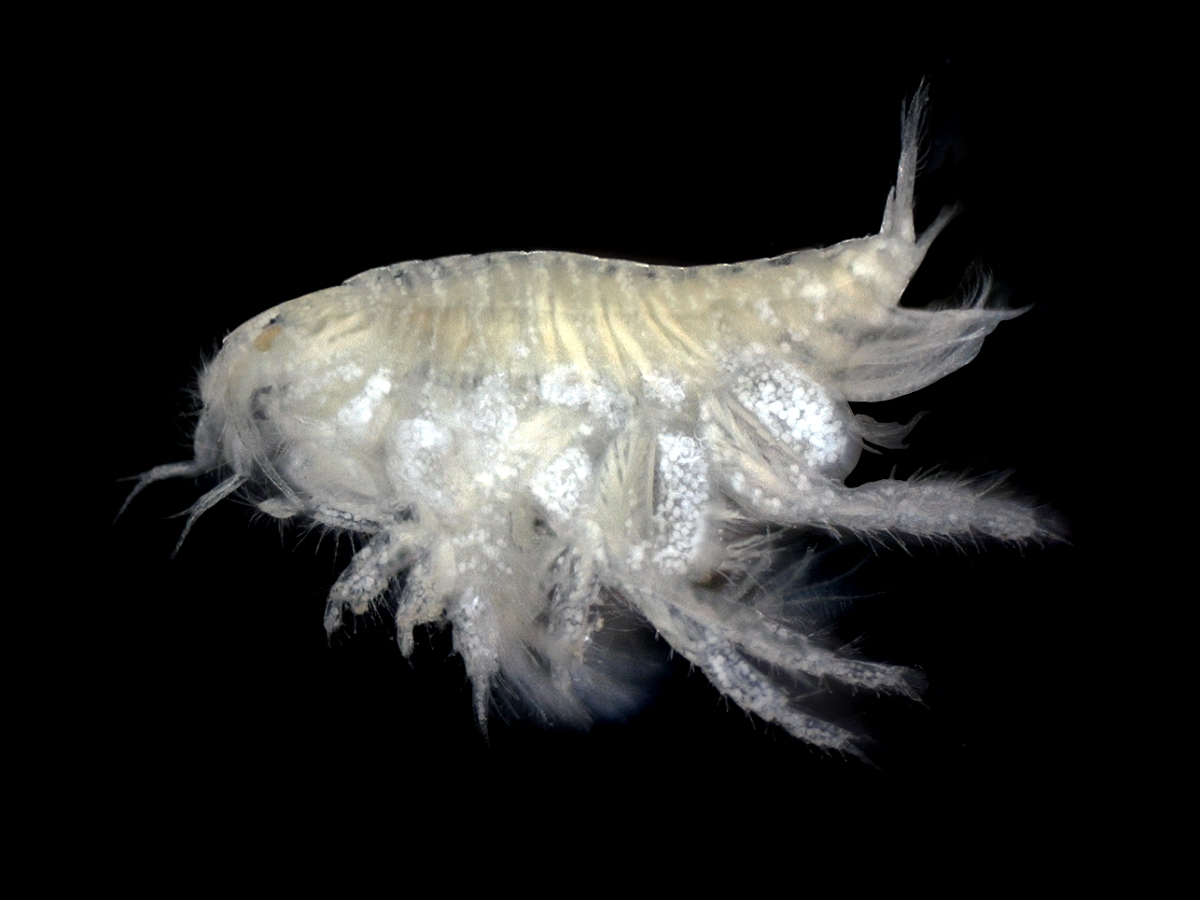
- Urothoe brevicornis

Scientific classification
- Kingdom: Animalia
- Phylum: Arthropoda
- Clade: Pancrustacea
- Class: Malacostraca
- Order: Amphipoda
- Suborder: Amphilochidea
- Infraorder: Lysianassida
- Parvorder: Haustoriidira
- Superfamily: Haustorioidea
- Family: Urothoidae; Bousfield, 1978

Genera
- See text

= Urothoidae =

Family of crustaceans

Urothoidae is a family of small marine amphipod crustaceans. Members of the family are found worldwide and are mainly detritivores and interface grazers, though some are also facultative filter feeders.

== Genera ==
- Carangolia J.L. Barnard, 1961
- Carangolioides Sittrop, Serejo, Souza-Filho & Senna, 2015
- Coronaurothoe Sittrop, Serejo, Souza-Filho & Senna, 2015
- Cunicus Griffiths, 1974
- Urothoe Dana, 1852
- Urothoides Stebbing, 1891
