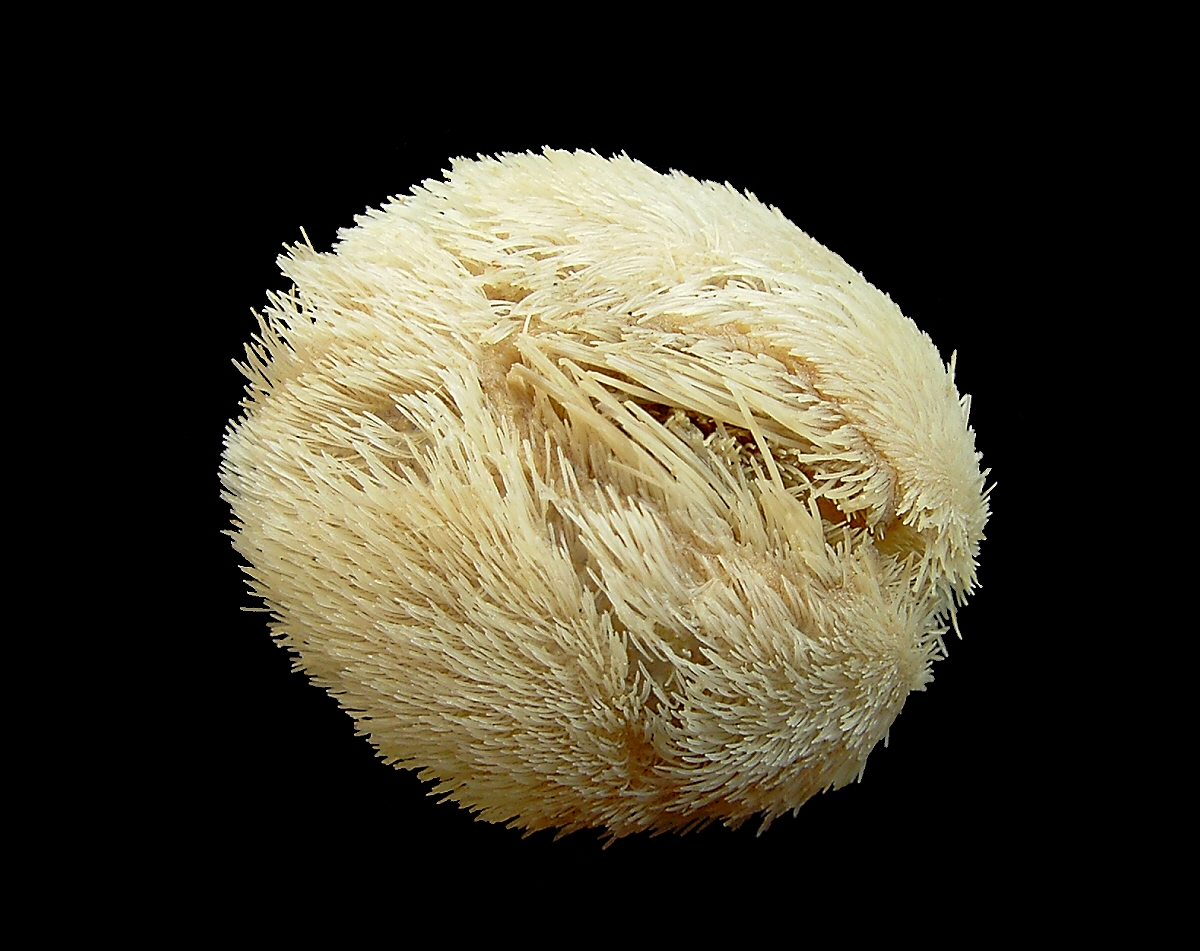
- Echinocardium cordatum

Scientific classification
- Kingdom: Animalia
- Phylum: Echinodermata
- Class: Echinoidea
- Order: Spatangoida
- Suborder: Brissidina
- Superfamily: Spatangoidea
- Family: Loveniidae; Lambert, 1905

Genera
- See text

= Loveniidae =

Family of sea urchins

Loveniidae is a family of heart urchins in the order Spatangoida.

== Description and characteristics ==
These sea urchins are called "heart urchins" due to the specific shape of their test, looking like a heart when seen from below (more or less depending on the genus). The mouth is located between the two cheeks, and the anus is below the tip.

== Genera ==
According to the World Register of Marine Species:

- genus Araeolampas Serafy, 1974
- genus Atelospatangus Koch, 1885 †
- genus Breynia Desor, in Agassiz & Desor, 1847
- genus Chuniola Gagel, 1903 †
- subfamily Echinocardiinae Cooke, 1942
  - genus Echinocardium Gray, 1825
- genus Gualtieria Desor, in Agassiz & Desor, 1847 †
- genus Hemipatagus Desor, 1858 †
- genus Laevipatagus Noetling, 1885 †
- genus Lovenia Desor, in Agassiz & Desor, 1847
- genus Pseudolovenia A. Agassiz & H.L. Clark, 1907b
- genus Semipetalion Szörényi, 1963 †
- genus Spatangomorpha Boehm, 1882 †
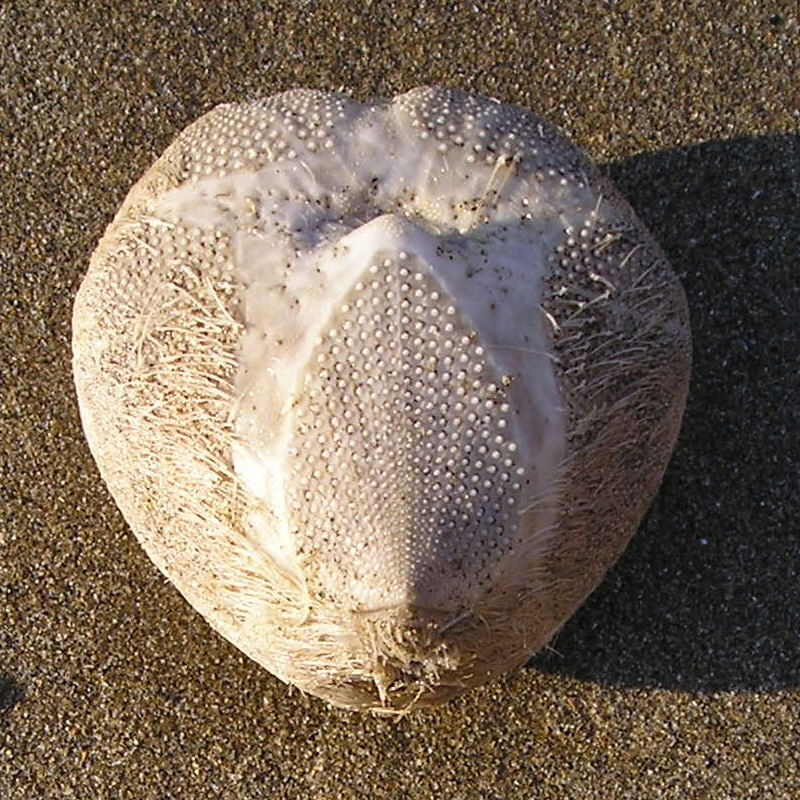
Shell of an Echinocardium cordatum, orale face.

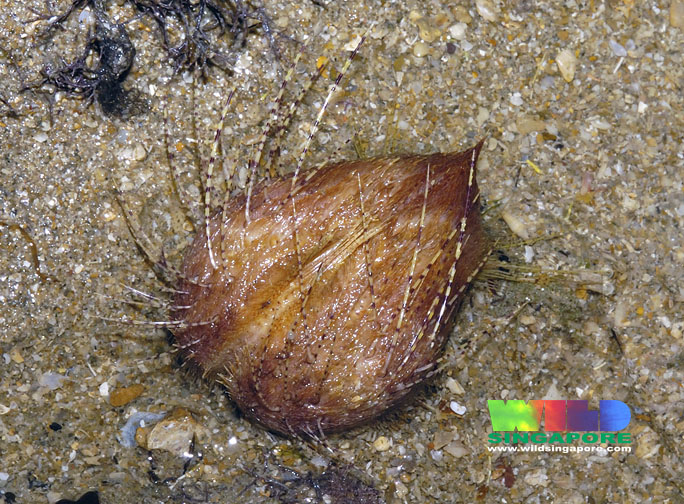
Lovenia elongata
