= Wana =

Wana may refer to:

== Call signs ==
- WANA-LD, a television station licensed to Naples, Florida, United States
- WFZX, a radio station which used the callsign WANA until 2008, Anniston, Alabama, United States

== Places ==
- Wana, Nepal
- Wana, Pakistan, a city in South Waziristan, Pakistan
- Waña (Peru), a mountain in the Wansu mountain range in the Andes of Peru
- Wana, West Virginia, USA
- WANA, an abbreviation for West Asia and North Africa
- Wana Subdivision, Khyber Pakhtunkhwa, Pakistan

== Other ==
- Battle of Wana (2004), between the Pakistan Army and members al-Qaeda near Wanna, Pakistan
- "Wana" (song), a 1977 song by Japanese group Candies
- Wana, Hawaiian name for Diadema paucispinum, a sea urchin with venomous spines
- Wana (Telecommunications), a telecommunications company in Morocco, currently known as Inwi
- Wana Brigade, an Infantry formation of the Indian Army during World War II
- Wana Udobang or Wana Wana, Nigerian writer and filmmaker
- Wireless Amateur Network of Amaliada, in Amaliada, Greece

== See also ==
- Wanas (4th century), a Coptic child martyr and the patron saint of lost things
