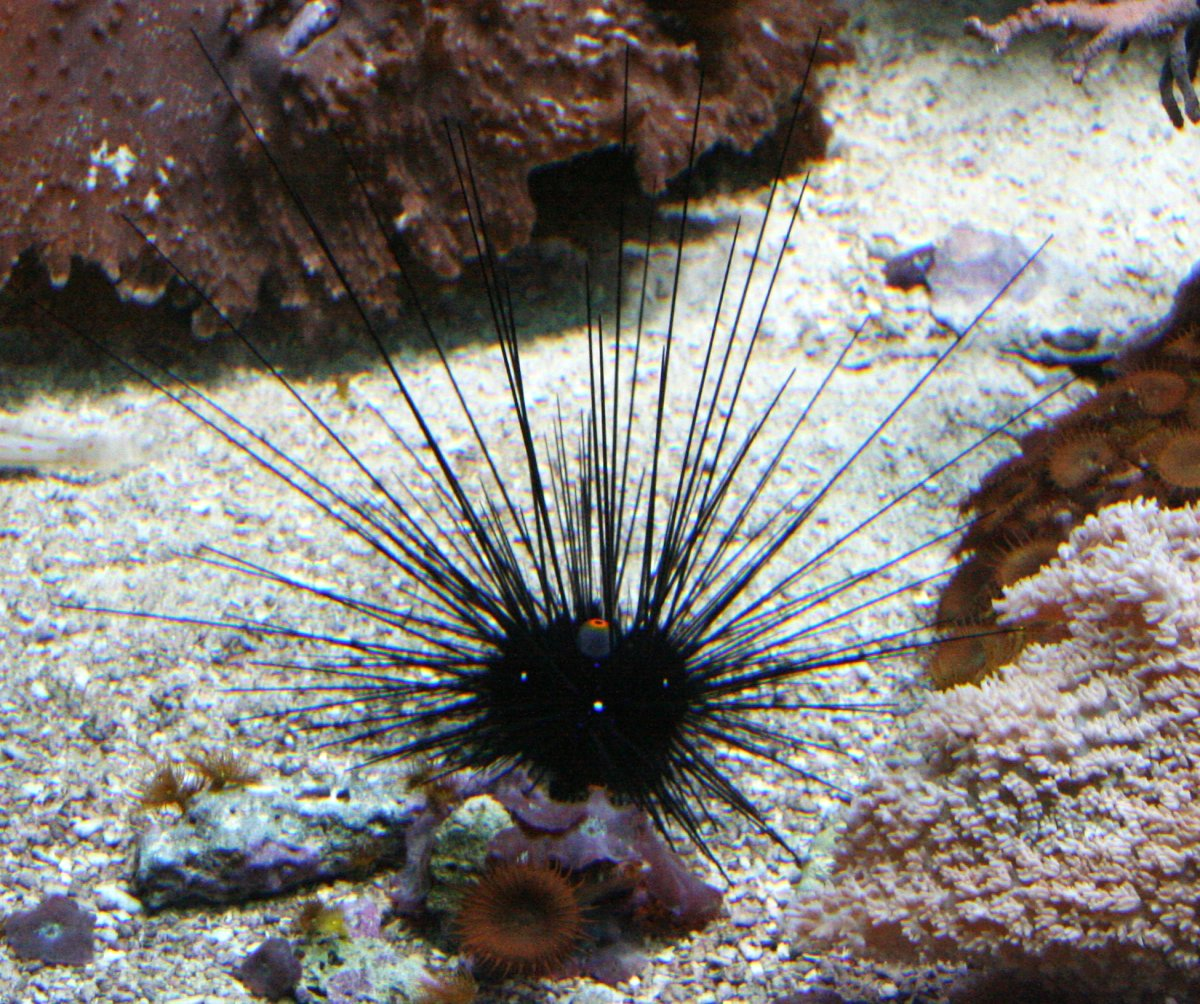
- Diadema setosum

Scientific classification
- Kingdom: Animalia
- Phylum: Echinodermata
- Class: Echinoidea
- Order: Diadematoida
- Family: Diadematidae
- Genus: Diadema; Gray, 1825

Species
- Diadema africanum; Diadema antillarum; Diadema ascensionis; Diadema mexicanum; Diadema palmeri; Diadema paucispinum; Diadema savignyi; Diadema setosum

= Diadema (echinoderm) =

Genus of sea urchins

Diadema is a genus of sea urchins of the family Diadematidae.

== Characteristics ==
It is one of the most abundant, widespread, and ecologically important shallow water genera of tropical sea urchins. It is found in all tropical oceans, although is ubiquitous in the Indo-Pacific region, where it inhabits depths down to 70 m. However each species inhabits roughly separate areas of ocean.

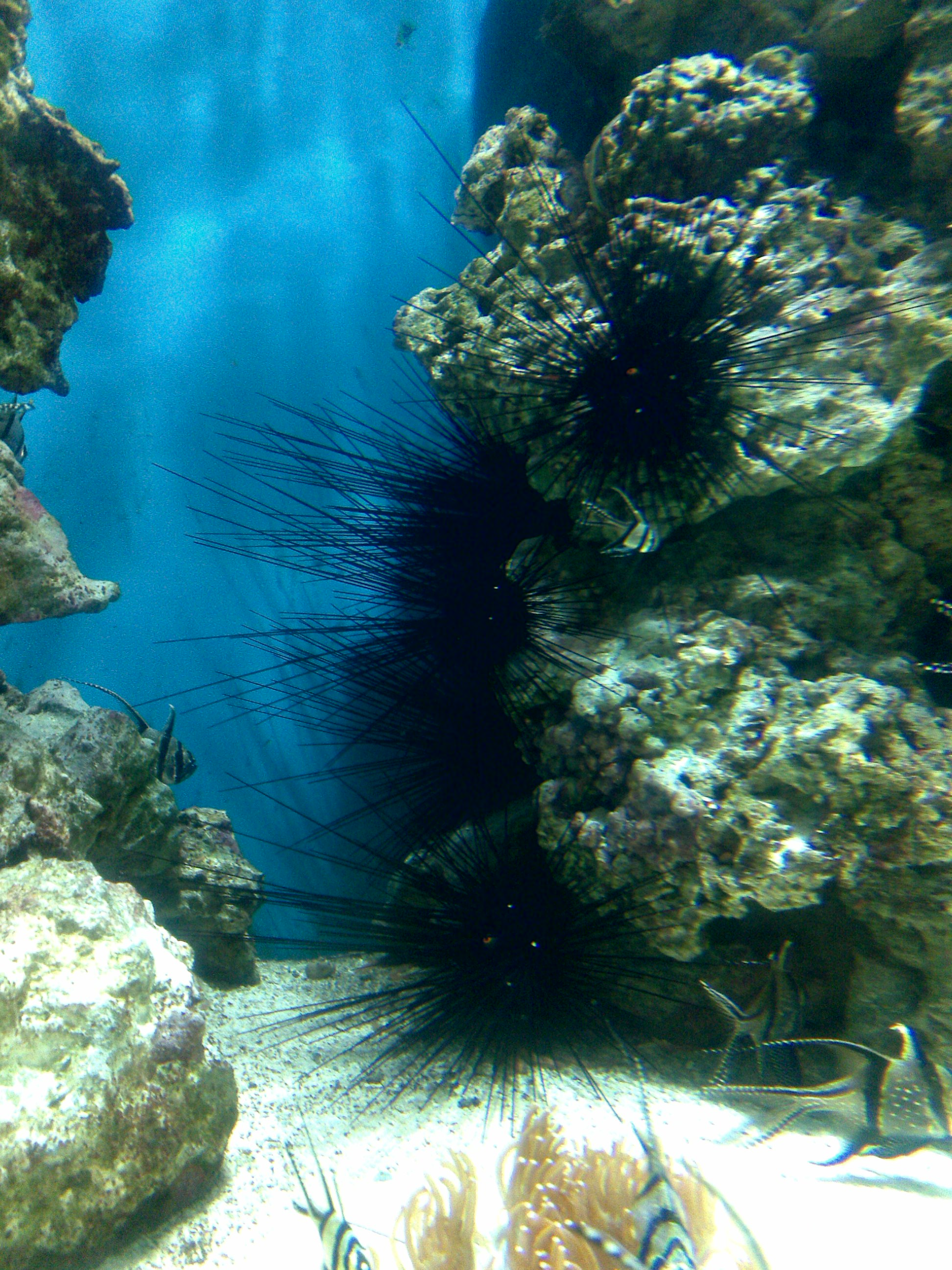
Long-spined urchins Diadema, London Zoo.

Speciation within the genus can be difficult to confirm, partly due to hybridisation, which is at least known to occur between Diadema savignyi and Diadema setosum.

The species vary in types of sea bed they inhabit, with Diadema savignyi inhabiting sandy beds and back reef where damaged; while Diadema setosum can also commonly be found among seagrass.

=== Fossil record ===
The fossil record of Diadema is extremely poor, consisting only of spines that possibly belong to the genus, some of which go back to the Miocene, 5 to 25 million years ago.

== Species list ==
According to World Register of Marine Species :

Image	Scientific name	Distribution
	Diadema africanum (Rodríguez, Hernández, Clemente & Coppard, 2013)	Western Africa
	Diadema antillarum (Philippi, 1845)	Gulf of Mexico
	Diadema ascensionis (Mortensen, 1909)	Central tropical Atlantic
	Diadema mexicanum (Agassiz, 1863)	West coast of tropical Americas
	Diadema palmeri (Baker, 1967)	South-west Pacific, especially New Zealand
	Diadema paucispinum (Agassiz, 1863)	Central Pacific, and possibly North Indian Ocean and other zones
	Diadema savignyi (Michelin, 1845)	Tropical Indo-Pacific
	Diadema setosum (Leske, 1778)	Tropical Indo-Pacific

=== Fossils ===
- Diadema principeana Weisbord, 1934 † (fossil taxon, Eocene from Cuba)
- Diadema vetus Lambert, 1931c † ( fossil taxon, first appeared in the Miocene in North Africa)

== Bibliography ==
- Nyawira A. Muthiga and Timothy R. McClanahan, "Diadema", in John M. Lawrence, Sea Urchins: Biology and Ecology, London, Elsevier, 2013.
- Lessios, H. A.; B. D. Kessing; John S. Pearse (2001). "Population structure and speciation in tropical seas. Global phylogeography of the sea urchin Diadema". Evolution. 55 (5): 955–975. doi:10.1554/0014-3820(2001)055[0955:PSASIT]2.0.CO;2. PMID 11430656.
- Edge of reef
