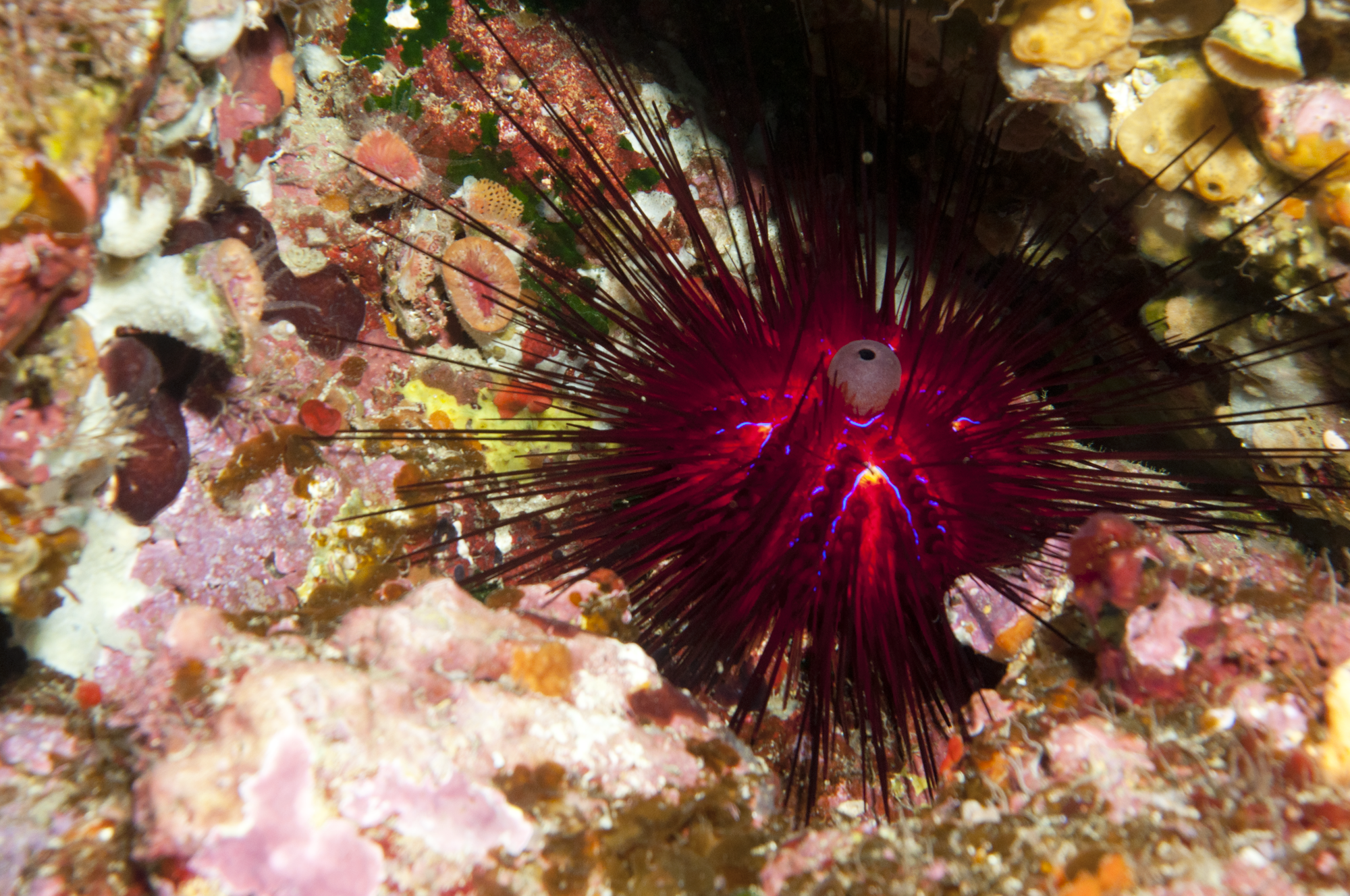
- Diadema palmeri specimen in New Zealand

Scientific classification
- Kingdom: Animalia
- Phylum: Echinodermata
- Class: Echinoidea
- Order: Diadematoida
- Family: Diadematidae
- Genus: Diadema
- Species: D. palmeri

Binomial name
- Diadema palmeri Baker, 1967

= Diadema palmeri =

Species of sea urchin

Diadema palmeri is a red sea urchin of the family Diadematidae.

== Habitat and distribution ==
It was first discovered by William (Bill) Palmer, at a depth of about 40 m (130 ft) off the Poor Knights Islands (35º28´S 174º44´E), a small group off the temperate north eastern coast of New Zealand. The species has also been found in other subtropical regions around the South Pacific at greater depths, including New Zealand's Kermadec Islands, and Australia's lower east coast - off Danger Point to Montague Island, New South Wales (at about 200 m), Lord Howe Island and the Norfolk Island Ridge.

== Bibliography ==
- Baker, Alan N. 1967. Two new echinoids from northern New Zealand, including a new species of Diadema. Transactions of the Royal Society of New Zealand (Zoology) 8 (23): 239–245.
- "Kermadec Islands - echinoderms".
