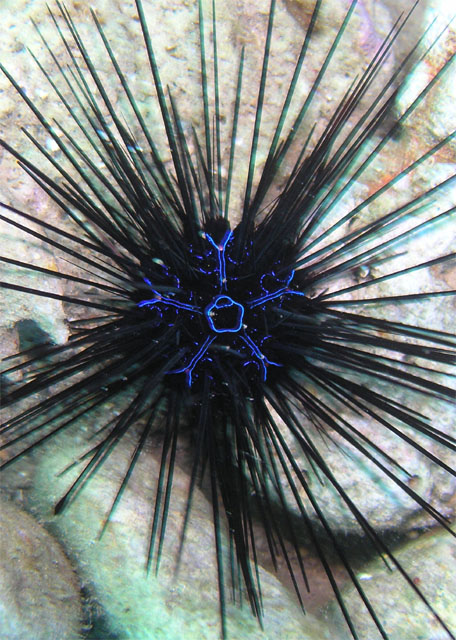

Scientific classification
- Kingdom: Animalia
- Phylum: Echinodermata
- Class: Echinoidea
- Order: Diadematoida
- Family: Diadematidae
- Genus: Diadema
- Species: D. savignyi

Binomial name
- Diadema savignyi (Audouin, 1829)

Synonyms
- Centrechinus savignyi (Audouin, 1829); Centrostephanus savignyi (Audouin, 1829); Cidarites savignyi Audouin, 1829; Diadema globulosum Bölsche, 1865

= Diadema savignyi =

Species of sea urchin

Diadema savignyi is a species of long-spined sea urchin belonging to the family Diadematidae. Common names include long-spined sea urchin, black longspine urchin and the banded diadem. It is native to the east coast of Africa, the Red Sea, the Indian Ocean and western Pacific Ocean. It was first described in 1829 by the French naturalist Jean Victoire Audouin. The specific epithet honours the French zoologist Marie Jules César Savigny who described many new marine species from the Mediterranean Sea and Red Sea. The type locality is Mauritius.

== Description ==
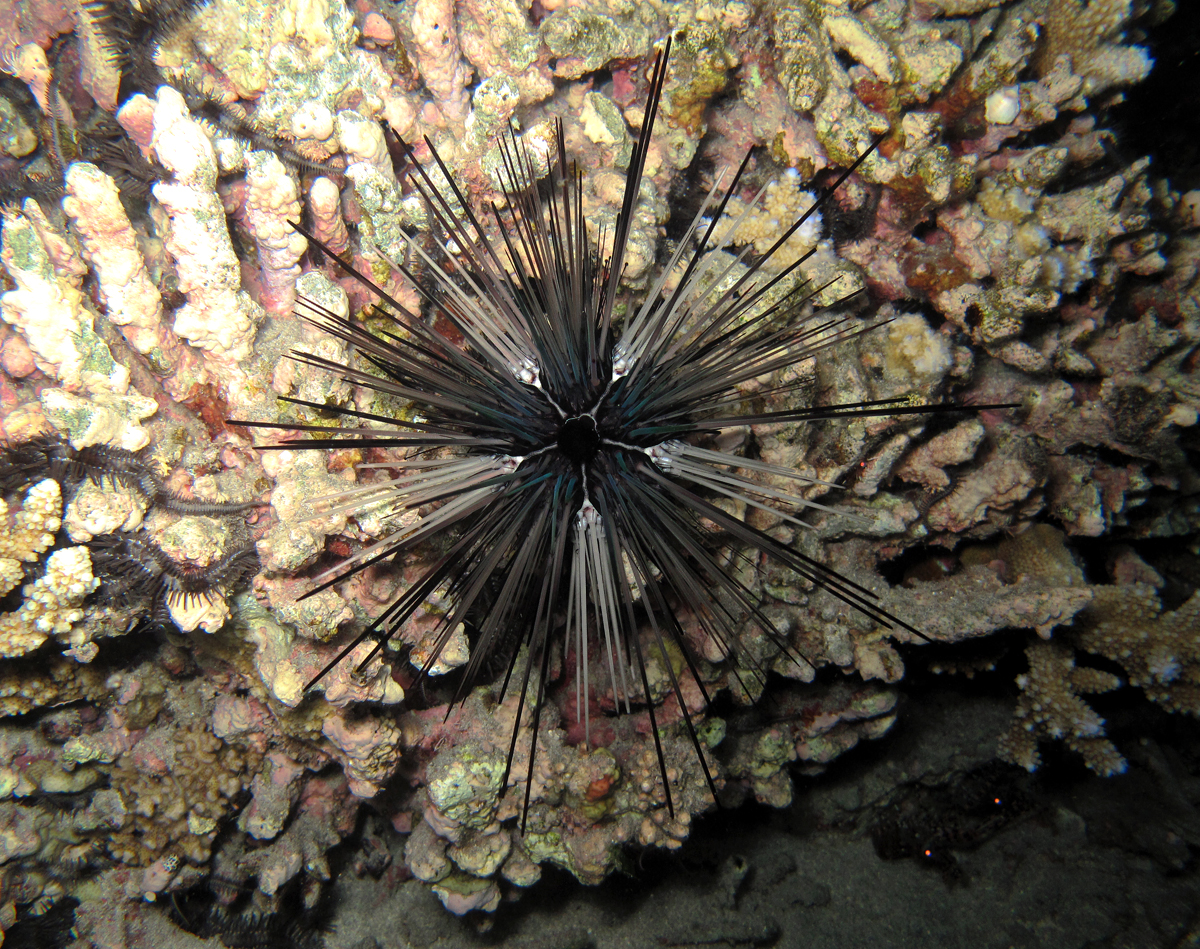
Diadema savignyi

Diadema savignyi has a usually black, spherical, slightly-flattened test up to about 9 cm (3.5 in) in diameter. The brittle, thin, hollow spines grow in tufts and can be as long as 25 cm (10 in). They are usually black but can also be grey, dark brown or purple. They may be banded with lighter and darker shades in juveniles and the occasional individual sea urchin is completely white. Diadema savignyi is similar in appearance to the closely related Diadema setosum with which it is sympatric, that is, the two species share a common range and frequently come into contact with each other. Diadema savignyi can be distinguished by the fact that it has iridescent green or blue lines in the interambulacral areas and around the periproct, a cone-shaped region surrounding the anus. In a small number of individuals there are pale coloured spots at the aboral (upper) ends of the interambulacrals. Another distinguishing feature is that D. savignyi does not have a thin orange ring round the periproct whereas D. setosum does.

== Distribution and habitat ==
The range of Diadema savignyi extends from the eastern coast of Africa and the Red Sea to French Polynesia, Hawaii, New Caledonia and northern Australia. It is typically found on mixed sandy, rocky and coral substrates especially in areas disturbed by storms or by other natural causes. Its depth range is from the surface down to about 70 metres (230 ft).

== Biology ==
Diadema savignyi is nocturnal and tends to hide in crevices or under boulders during the day, or several individuals may huddle together in the open. The urchins disperse at dusk to feed on the algal mat that grows over the surface of seabed. In the course of tearing up the mat the urchin also abrades the underlying surface, causing bioerosion. Its activities help control the algae which otherwise might overwhelm the corals. Certain small fish such as cardinal fish, flatworms and shrimps sometimes seek protection from predators among the long spines. The sea urchin is preyed on by pufferfish (Tetraodontidae) and porcupinefish (Diodontidae), and also lobsters and snails. It reacts to a shadow falling on it by angling its spines towards the possible attacker.

Diadema savignyi and Diadema setosum live in close proximity and often in mixed groups on reefs and in shallow lagoons off the coast of East Africa. The latter breeds throughout the year, but breeding in D. savignyi is concentrated and occurs mainly during the north-east monsoon period, peaking in May. Hybridisation between the two species is largely prevented by the fact that the release of gametes by each is synchronised with the lunar cycle. D. savignyi spawns just after the full moon, on days seventeen to eighteen of the lunar cycle, whereas D. setosum mostly spawns around days eight to ten.
