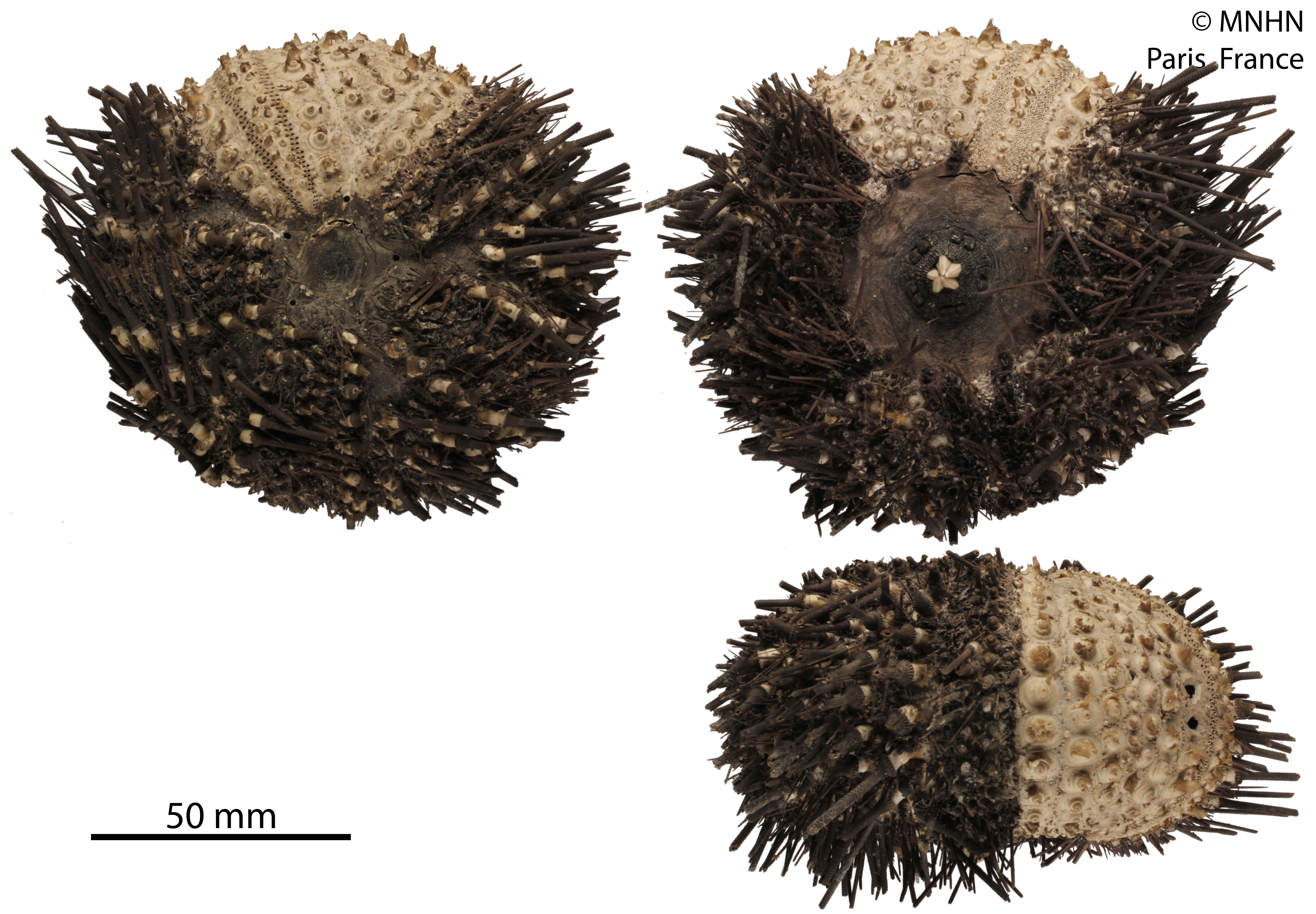

Scientific classification
- Kingdom: Animalia
- Phylum: Echinodermata
- Class: Echinoidea
- Order: Diadematoida
- Family: Diadematidae
- Genus: Diadema
- Species: D. mexicanum

Binomial name
- Diadema mexicanum A. Agassiz, 1863

Synonyms
- Centrechinus mexicanus (A. Agassiz, 1863); Diadema mexicana – unjustified emendation

= Diadema mexicanum =

Species of sea urchin

Diadema mexicanum is a species of long-spined sea urchin belonging to the family Diadematidae. It is native to the Pacific coast of Mexico, Costa Rica, El Salvador, Nicaragua and Panama.

== Reef ecology ==
The coral reefs off the Pacific coast of Central America are thin and small relative to their counterparts in the Indo-Pacific and Caribbean. They are subject to periodic stresses such as El Niño events. In 1982–1983, 50 to 90% of the corals in the region were lost. A large increase in the population of Diadema mexicanum resulted and there was an increase in damage to the reefs caused by their spines. Diadema mexicanum is a herbivore and an important member of the reef community and plays a significant role in controlling algal growth. By limiting this growth they are capable of preserving coral by reducing competition for space and light. However, when the populations of sea urchins get too large their spines cause excessive abrasion to the corals and bioerosion of the reef. Nevertheless, the reduction in algae present is beneficial for the settlement of coral larvae. A reduction in the number of sea urchins causes overgrowth of algae to the detriment of the corals, and little recruitment of corals occur. For the reef to recover after a bleaching event there needs to be a change in the balance between the rate of reef accumulation and reef erosion. It is necessary to maintain a healthy level of grazing by sea urchins to maintain a moderate algal cover and allow coral recruitment.
