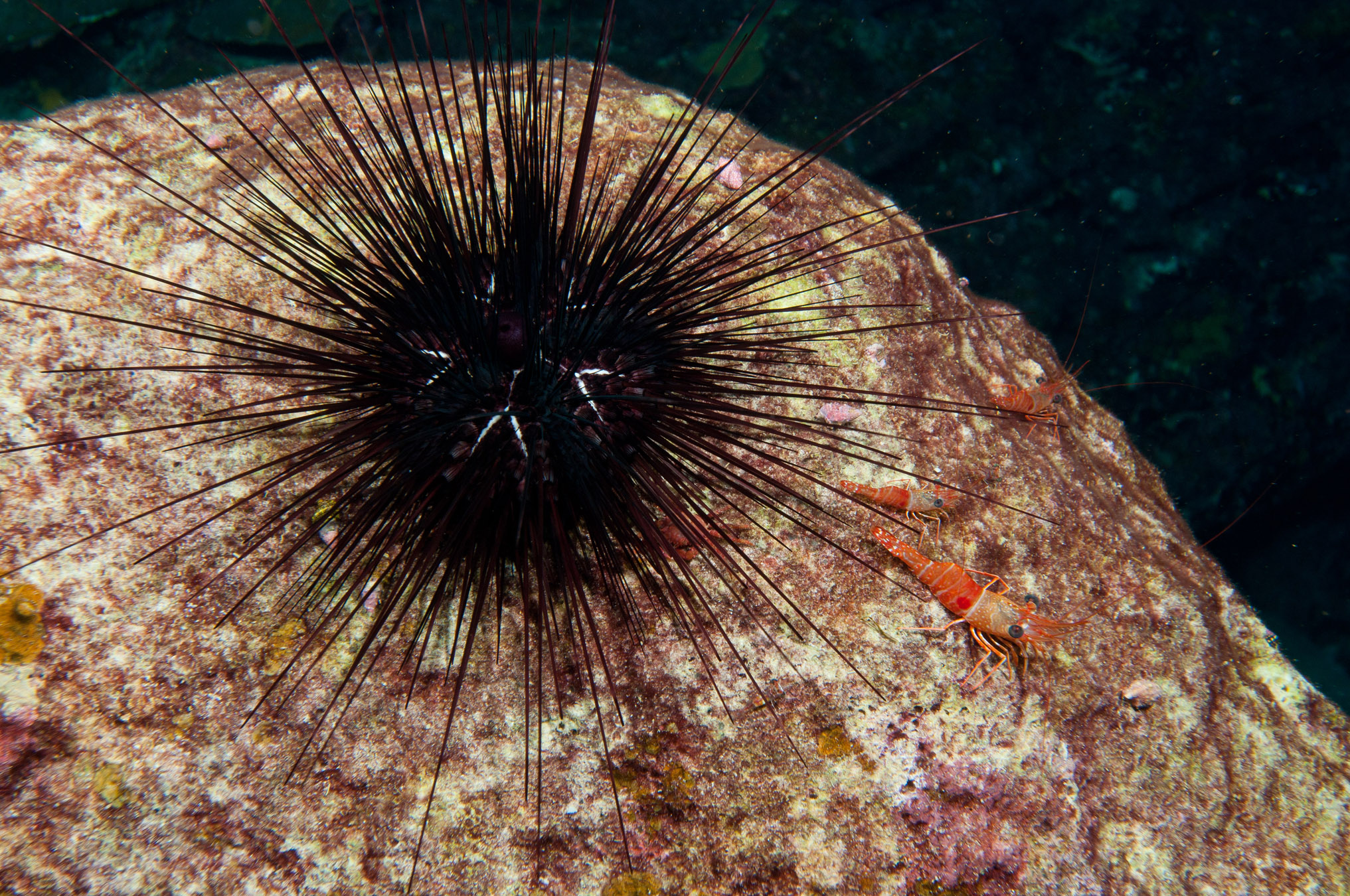

Conservation status
- Apparently Secure (NatureServe)

Scientific classification
- Kingdom: Animalia
- Phylum: Echinodermata
- Class: Echinoidea
- Order: Diadematoida
- Family: Diadematidae
- Genus: Diadema
- Species: D. antillarum

Binomial name
- Diadema antillarum (Philippi, 1845)

Synonyms
- Centrechinus antillarum (Philippi, 1845); Centrechinus setosus Jackson, 1912; Cidaris antillarum Philippi, 1845

= Diadema antillarum =

Species of sea urchin

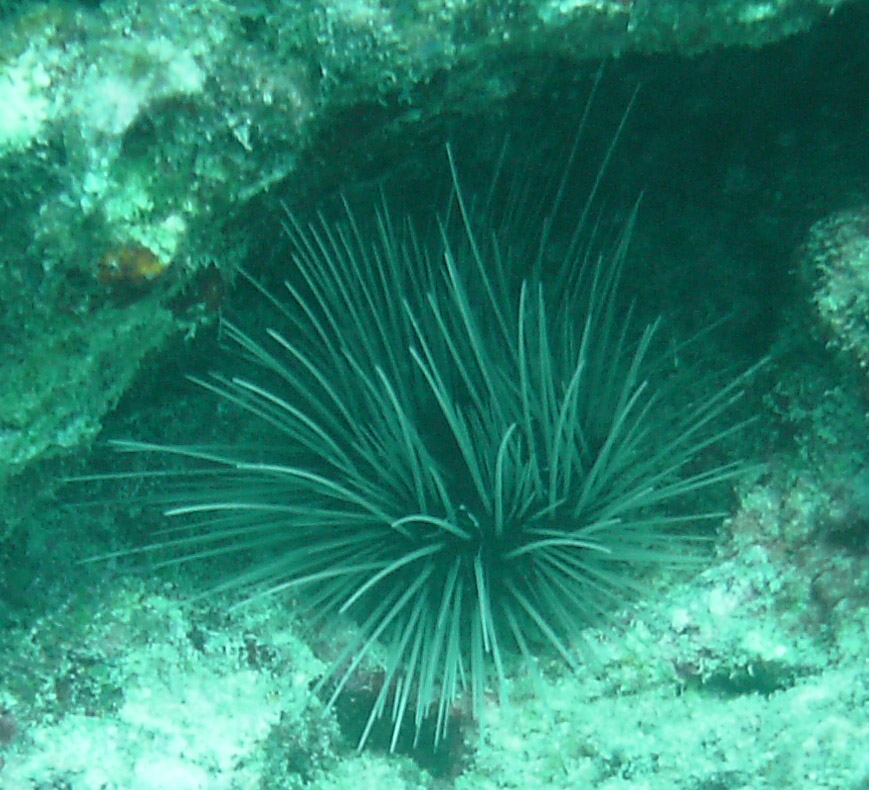
Diadema with unusual grey spines at Snapper Ledge

Diadema antillarum, also known as the lime urchin, black sea urchin, or the long-spined sea urchin, is a species of sea urchin in the family Diadematidae.

This sea urchin is characterized by its exceptionally long black spines.

It is the most abundant and important herbivore on the coral reefs of the western Atlantic and Caribbean basin. When the population of these sea urchins is at a healthy level, they are the main grazers which prevent algae overgrowth of the reef.

== Anatomy ==
Diadema antillarum has a "shell", similar to most other sea urchins. What distinguishes the Diadema is the length of its spines. Most sea urchin spines are 1–3 cm, but the spines in this species are usually 10–12 cm in length, and can grow as long as 30 cm in very large individuals.

== Life habits and ecological importance ==
This species usually lives at 1–10 metres in depth on coral reefs. They will often lodge themselves in a crevice, so that only their spines can be seen, but individual urchins who cannot find a suitable crevice will live in more exposed situations. Individuals that have been able to find a crevice usually will roam about one metre from their crevice at night during feeding. Diadema is very sensitive to light, and will often pick its crevice or resting place based on how much shade there is.

Diadema mostly eat algae, and sometimes seagrass. Starving urchins have been known to become carnivorous. This species is ecologically important because it consumes algae that can otherwise grow to such an extent that they can smother coral reefs.

Diadema antillarum produce over a million eggs per spawning event. The 1983 mass mortality of this species led to widespread algal overgrowth on Caribbean reefs, resulting in reduced coral cover and biodiversity.

== Range ==
Diadema antillarum is still, in some tropical areas, one of the most abundant, widespread, and ecologically important shallow-water sea urchins. It is found in the tropical Western Atlantic Ocean, including the Caribbean Sea, Gulf of Mexico and the northern and eastern coasts of South America (as far south as Brazil). It is also found in the East Atlantic at the Canary Islands and the Indian Ocean.

In 1983, throughout the Caribbean faunal zone as far south as South America and north to the Bahamas, Diadema antillarum underwent mass mortality, with more than 97% of the urchins dying. Since this time some Caribbean reefs have been overgrown by foliose macroalgae. This inhibits coral growth and has further compounded the ongoing decline of scleractinian corals. It also has an overall negative effect on coral reef resilience, which encompasses the ability of a system to resist and recover from changes stemming from perturbation events. Recent studies done in Discovery Bay, Jamaica, and other locations appear to show a massive comeback of Diadema, and great regeneration of the reefs. As of 2015 populations are densest in the eastern Caribbean at Jamaica, Barbados, Dominica, and Puerto Rico, while either remaining virtually stable at low values or showing small increases on the coast of Central America and in Cuba, Florida, the Bahamas, the Virgin Islands, and Curaçao. The highest rate of increase has been on the north coast of Jamaica, and the lowest in Florida, Cuba, and the Bahamas. Two populations, in Venezuela and the San Blas Islands, Panama, have actually continued to decline with time. In 2022, another die-off was reported in the Caribbean, specifically the U.S. Virgin Islands, Saba, and St. Eustatius.

== Human relevance ==
When the sea urchins died due to an unknown disease, the biodiversity of the marine life of the coral reefs suffered a great deal. The resulting lush algae growth stunted and even reversed the development of coral, and the fish and other animals living on the reefs declined in numbers due to less food and shelter.

The reduced biodiversity of the coral reefs affected tourism in several small countries, which depended on the natural beauty of their reefs to help attract visitors, and because tourism was a major part of the income for these countries, the decreased flow of guests stressed their economy.

Low-density populations, predators, and waves from high-powered storms tends to impede the repopulation of Diadema antillarum. In the fertilization process, male and female urchins excrete fluid to alert other urchins to respond by releasing their eggs and sperm in mass reproduction. With more gametes available, there is a higher chance of fertilization. However, in areas of low-population, a few sea urchins may not be enough to initiate fertilization. After fertilization, there is still a high chance that predators may consume the vulnerable juveniles. Because of the movement of water in powerful storms, urchins can get swept away from their habitat and expire. It is possible to aid the increase in population growth of the urchin with more research and volunteers.

== Research on re-population of the species ==
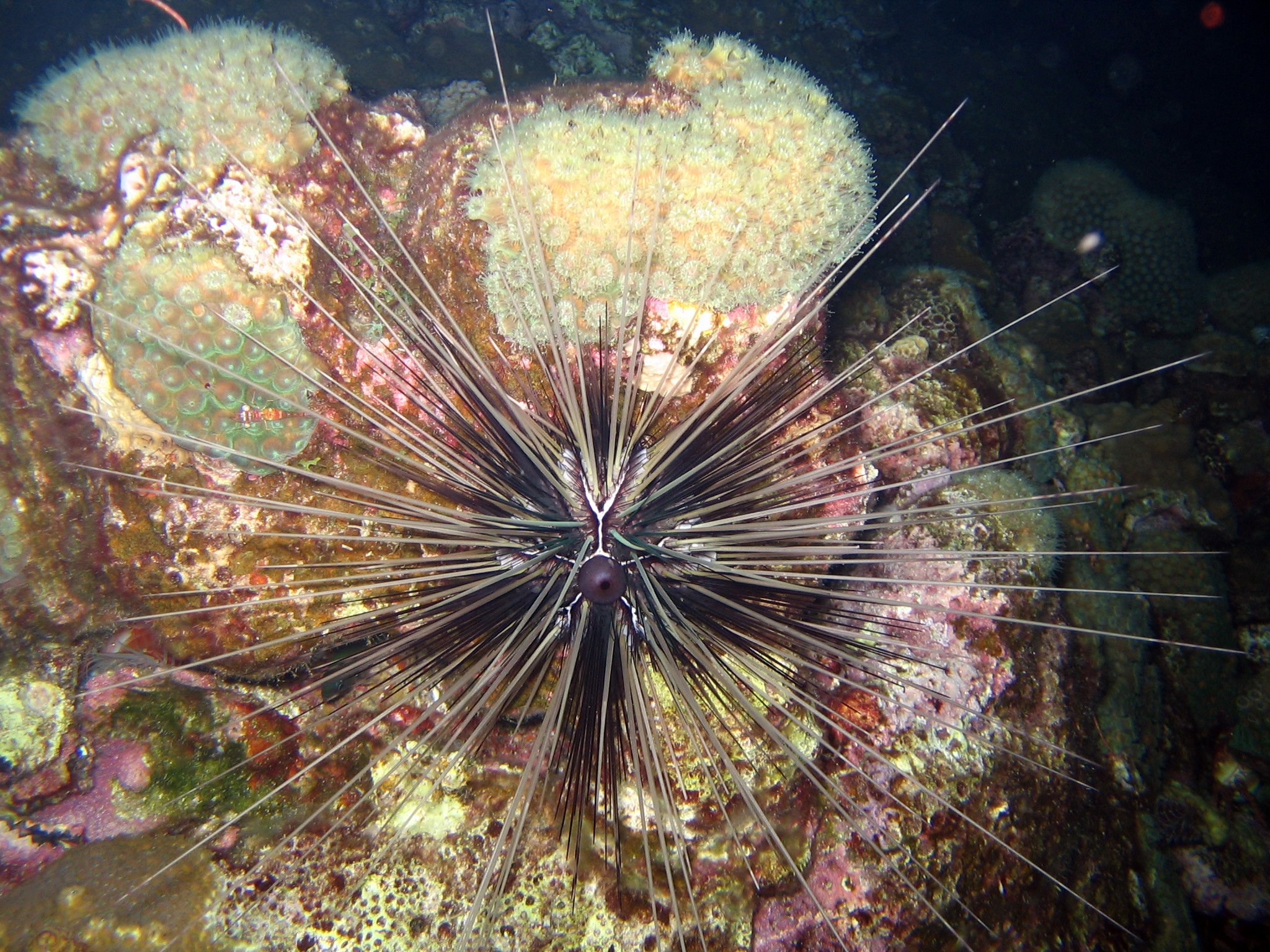

Research on the species Diadema antillarum is still in its early stages. The urchins can be grown in laboratories and then relocated. Returning the mature individuals into the wild can have a positive effect on the urchin density of the reef. The increase in population can also be aided by the artificial building of reefs: material such as concrete can encourage the growth of coral, and provide more niches for the urchins to hide from predators such as larger fish.

When there are still some areas of high-density urchins, it is possible to relocate urchins to other, low-density reefs. With these methods and the help of volunteer workers, it seems that the shift back to coral-dominated reefs and away from algae-dominated reefs is possible.

Dedicated nurseries exist in Jamaica and Puerto Rico.
