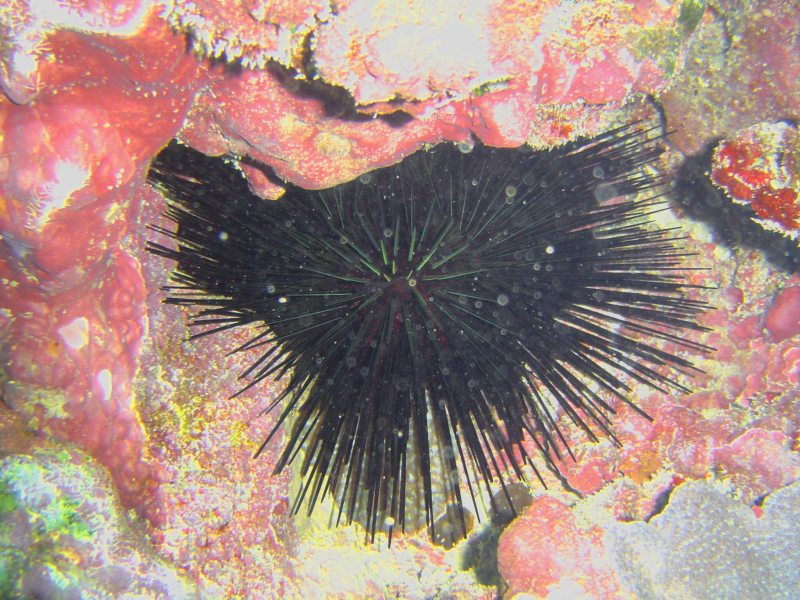
- Echinothrix diadema

Scientific classification
- Kingdom: Animalia
- Phylum: Echinodermata
- Class: Echinoidea
- Infraclass: Acroechinoidea
- Superorder: Diadematacea; Duncan, 1889

Orders
- Diadematoida; Micropygoida

= Diadematacea =

Diadematacea Temporal range: Late Triassic–Recent

Superorder of sea urchins

The Diadematacea are a superorder of sea urchins. Unlike most other sea urchins, they generally have hollow spines. The tubercles on their tests are perforated, and most species possess gills.
