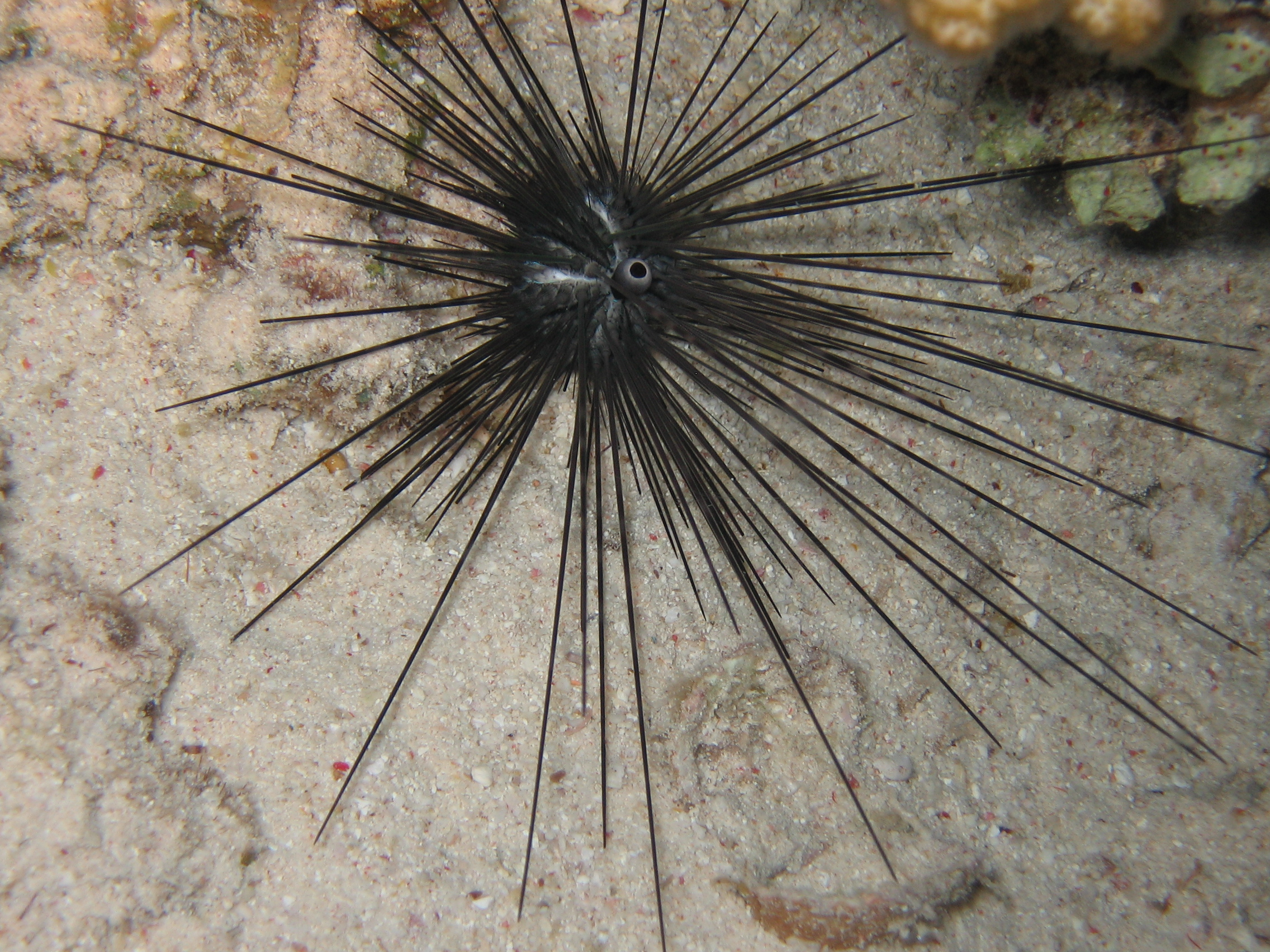

Scientific classification
- Kingdom: Animalia
- Phylum: Echinodermata
- Class: Echinoidea
- Order: Diadematoida
- Family: Diadematidae
- Genus: Diadema
- Species: D. paucispinum

Binomial name
- Diadema paucispinum A. Agassiz, 1863

Synonyms
- Centrechinus paucispinus (A. Agassiz, 1863)

= Diadema paucispinum =

Species of sea urchin

Diadema paucispinum, the long-spined sea urchin, is a species of sea urchin in the family Diadematidae. It is found in the western Indo-Pacific Ocean and in Hawaii and other east Pacific islands.

== Description ==
Diadema paucispinum is a small sea urchin with very long, moveable spines which are slender and sharply pointed. They can be up to 25 cm (10 in) long and about four times the diameter of the test. The primary spines are bluish-black in colour, often with pale bands in younger individuals. The shorter secondary ones are brittle and venomous and easily break off in the skin. There are photosensitive spots in the urchin's epidermis and if a shadow falls on the animal, it angles its secondary spines towards the intruder. These can cause a painful sting if they come into contact with bare skin. Near the apex of the test is a clearly visible anus surrounded by an orange ring and raised on a small projection. Radiating from this are five narrow, bright blue lines.

== Distribution and habitat ==
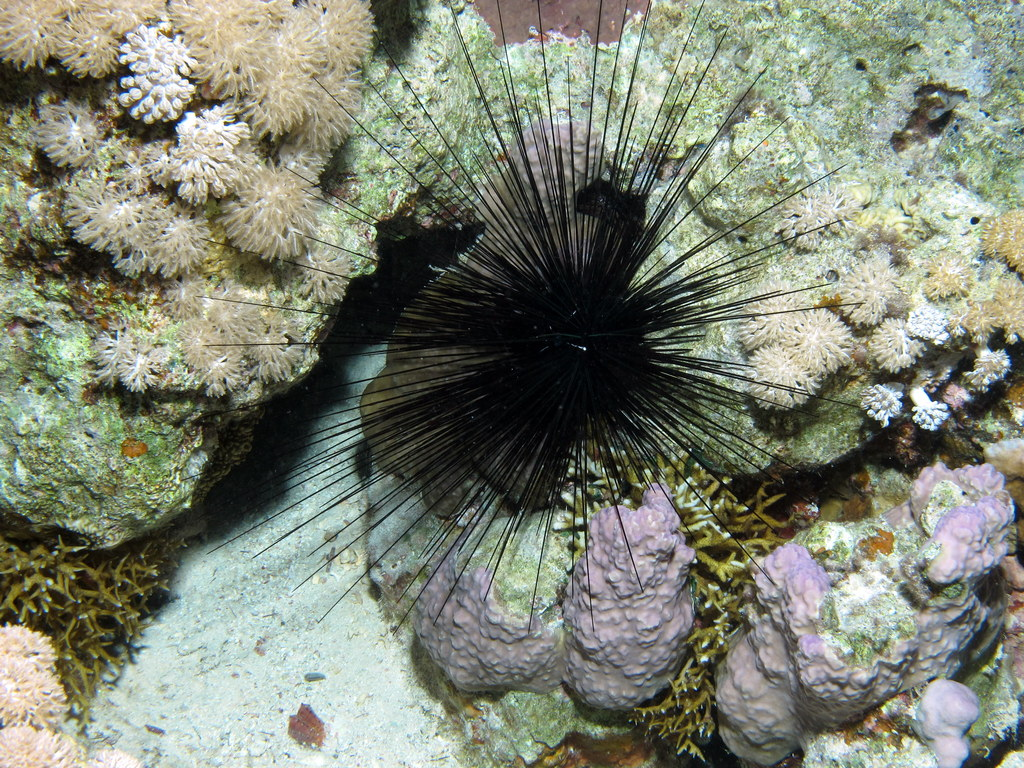
Diadema paucispinum

There are two mitochondrial clades of Diadema paucispinum. One was originally considered to be limited to Hawaii but has now been found on Easter Island, Pitcairn, and Okinawa. The other one ranges from East Africa and Arabia to the Philippines and New Guinea. In shallow parts of the Red Sea this sea urchin is found on calcareous rocky shelves a few feet under the surface where it uses its spines to wedge itself into crevices and hollows in the rock. In Hawaii it is known as "wana" and is found on reef flats and gently shelving areas.

== Ecology ==
Diadema paucispinum is nocturnal and grazes on filamentous algae as it crawls over the rocks. Despite its formidable defensive armoury, Diadema paucispinum is preyed on by triggerfishes.

== Stings ==
Skin contact with this sea urchin should be avoided. An injury caused by the secondary spines should first be soaked in hot water to deactivate the toxins and later vinegar may help soften the spines. Surgical removal of spine tips that remain in the skin is difficult because of their fragility. Left alone they may gradually be absorbed into the tissues.
