= Pickles Reef =

Coral reef in the Florida Keys, US

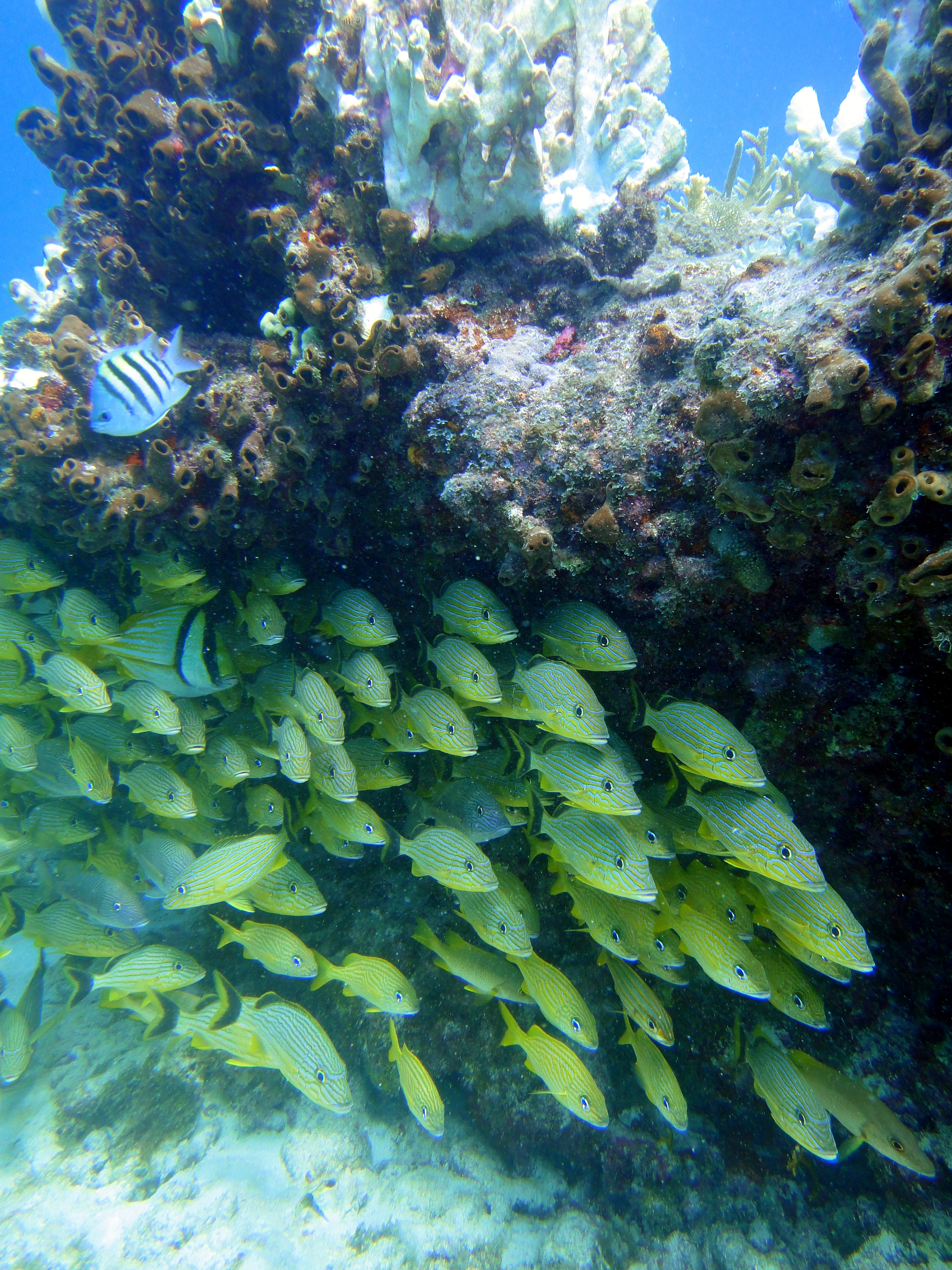
- School of grunts and sergeant majors

- Location within Florida Location within the Caribbean

Location
- Location: Caribbean
- Coordinates: 24°59′15″N 80°24′52″W
- Country: United States

Geology
- Type: reef

Pickles Reef is a small coral reef located within the Florida Keys National Marine Sanctuary. It lies to the southeast of Key Largo, to the south the Key Largo Existing Management Area and John Pennekamp Coral Reef State Park. Unlike many reefs within the Sanctuary, this reef is not within a Sanctuary Preservation Area (SPA).

The reef gets its name from the Pickle Barrel wreck.

Another small reef called Snapper Ledge is nearby.

== Shipwreck ==
Various types of debris are scattered across the reef, including a number of barrel-shaped concrete objects. Local legend was that the concrete objects had been barrels of concrete on a ship or barge that had wrecked on the reef during the Civil War, but an analysis performed in 2008 showed that the concrete was a type of Portland cement produced between 1890 and 1923. Archaeologists have found evidence of an iron- or steel-hulled vessel with two masts that wrecked on the reef, but have not identified the ship. It is not clear how much of the debris on the reef is from that wreck.

== Gallery ==
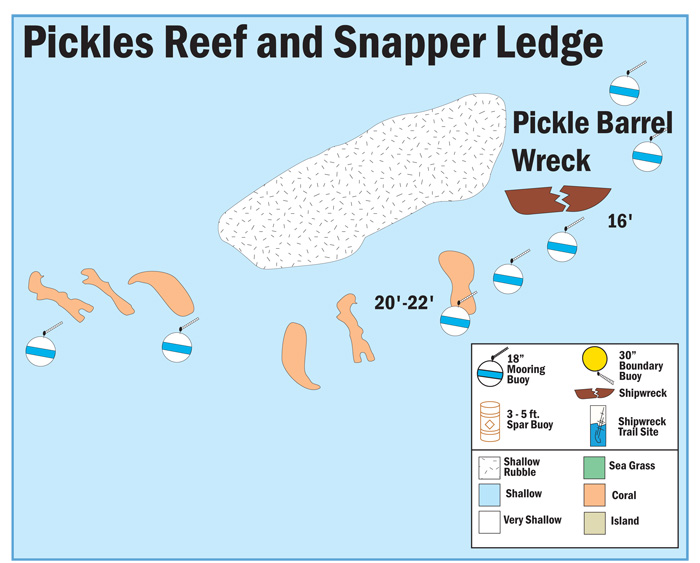
Buoys at Pickles Reef and Snapper Ledge

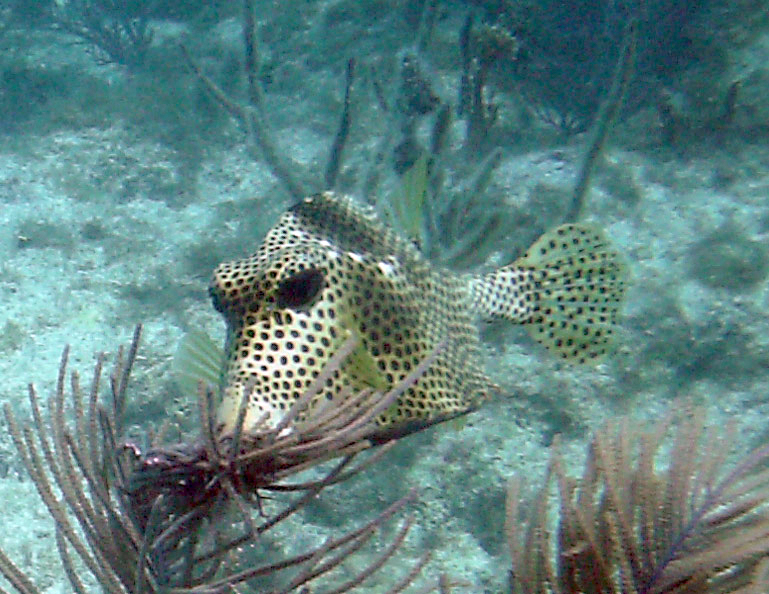
Spotted trunkfish (Lactophrys sp.) at Pickles Reef, March 2008

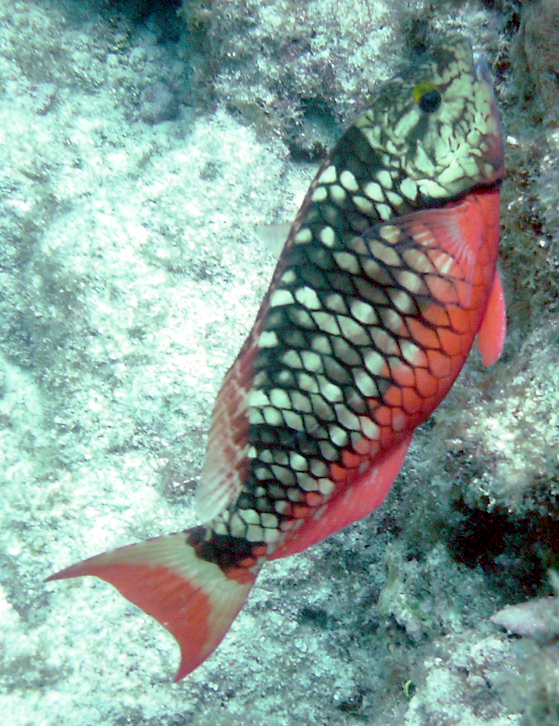
A stoplight parrotfish (Sparisoma viride) at Pickles Reef, March 2008

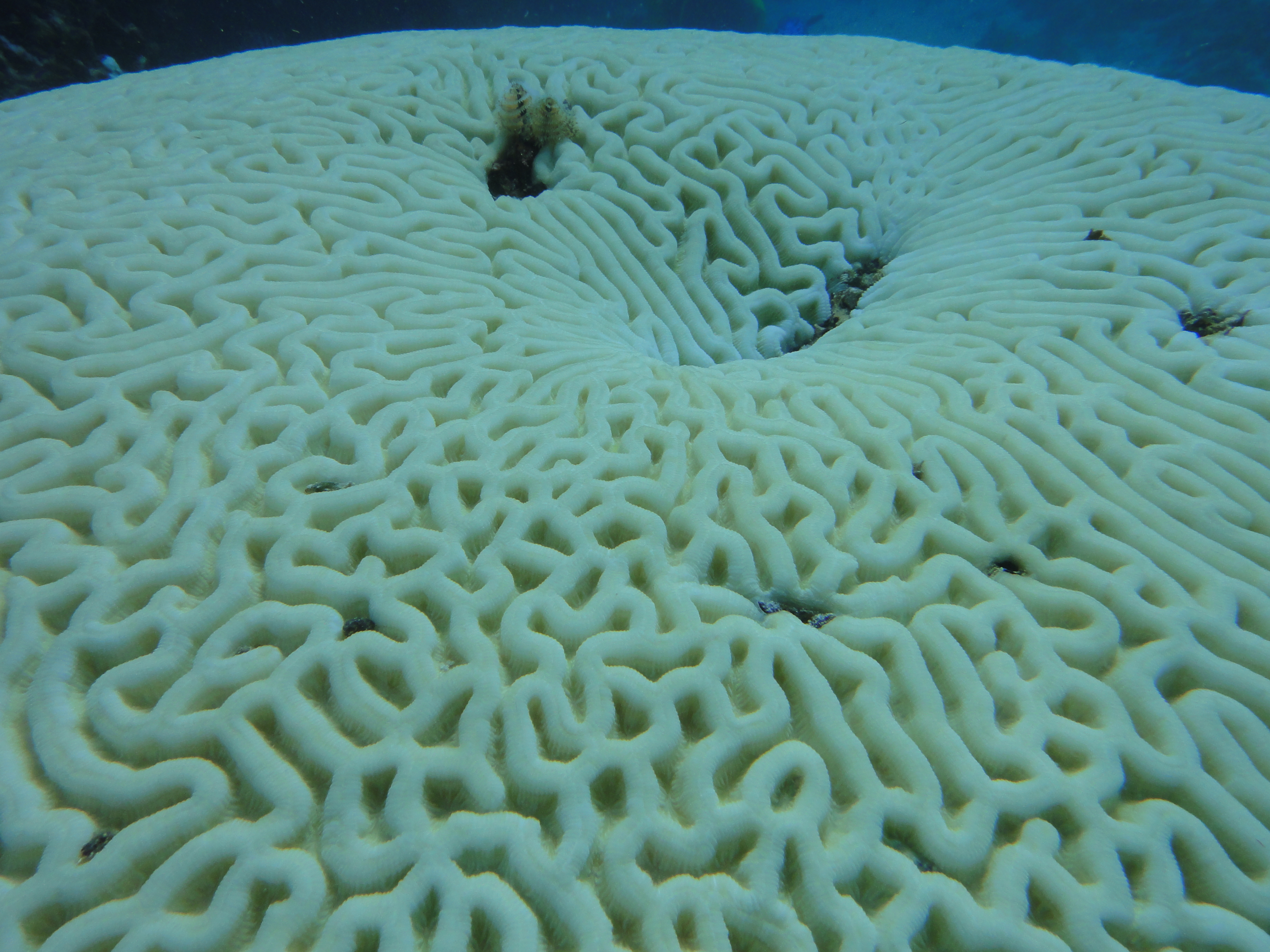
Large bleached brain coral, 2014

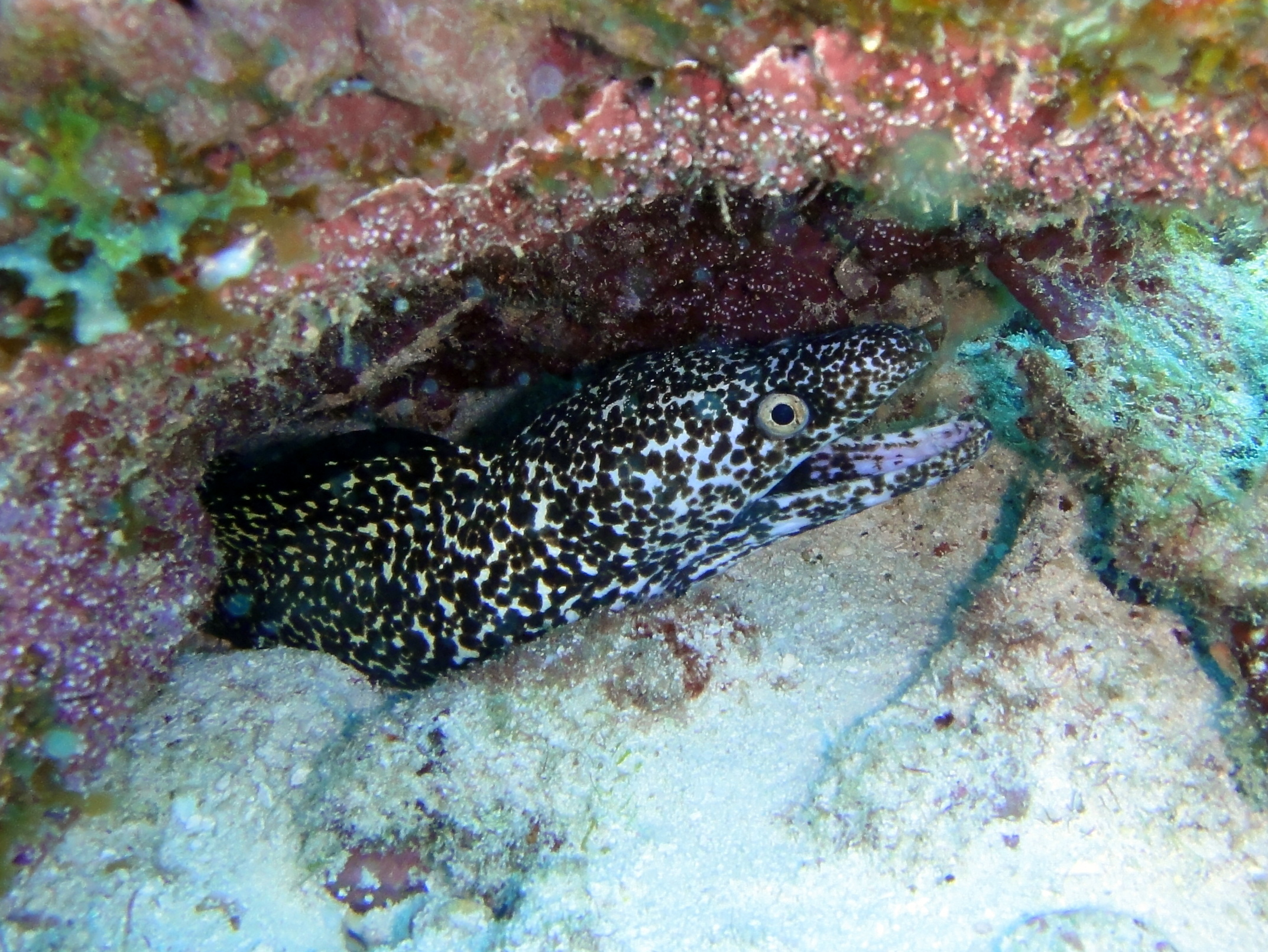
Spotted moray eel, 2014

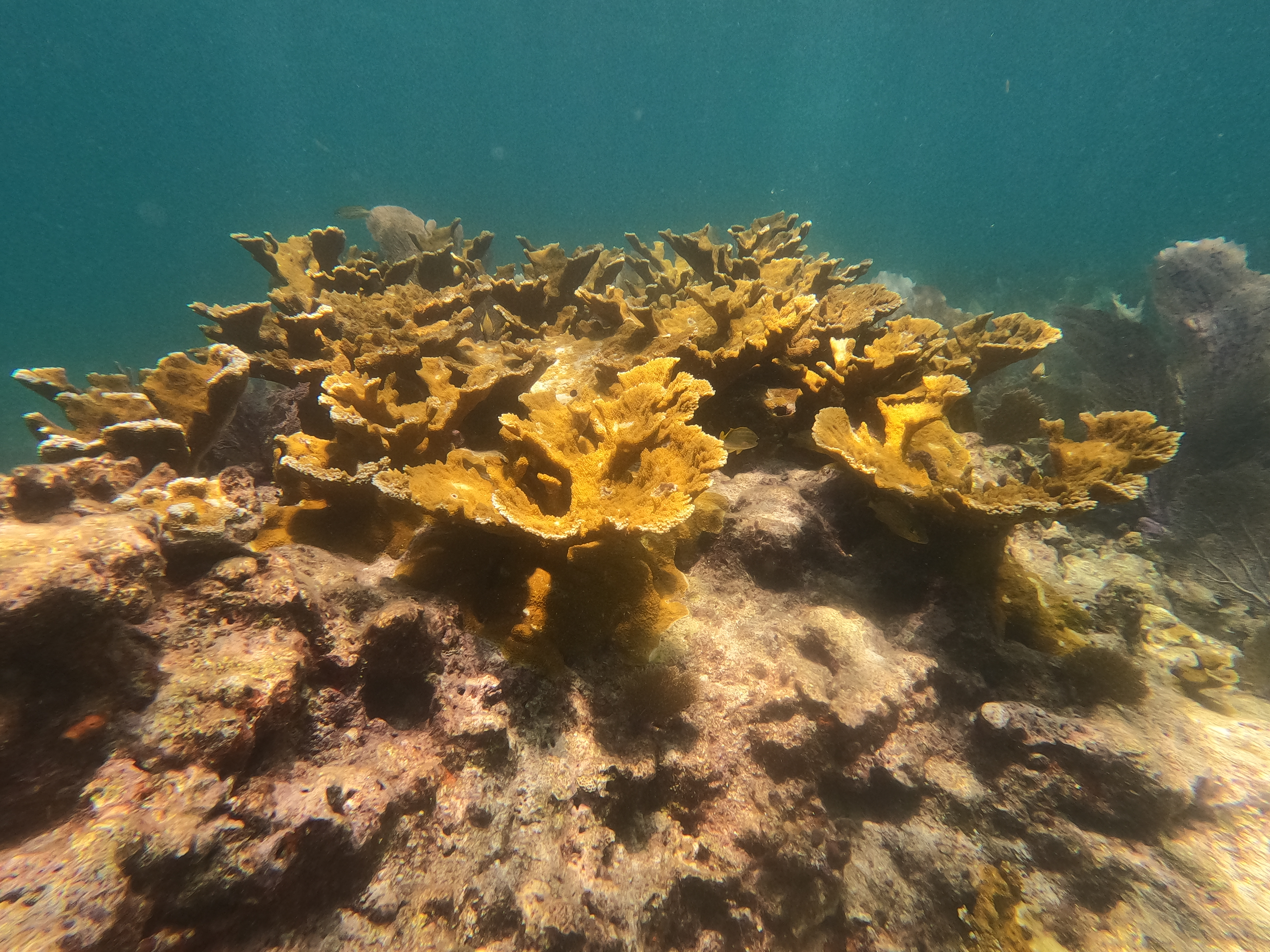
Stand of Acropora palmata in 2023

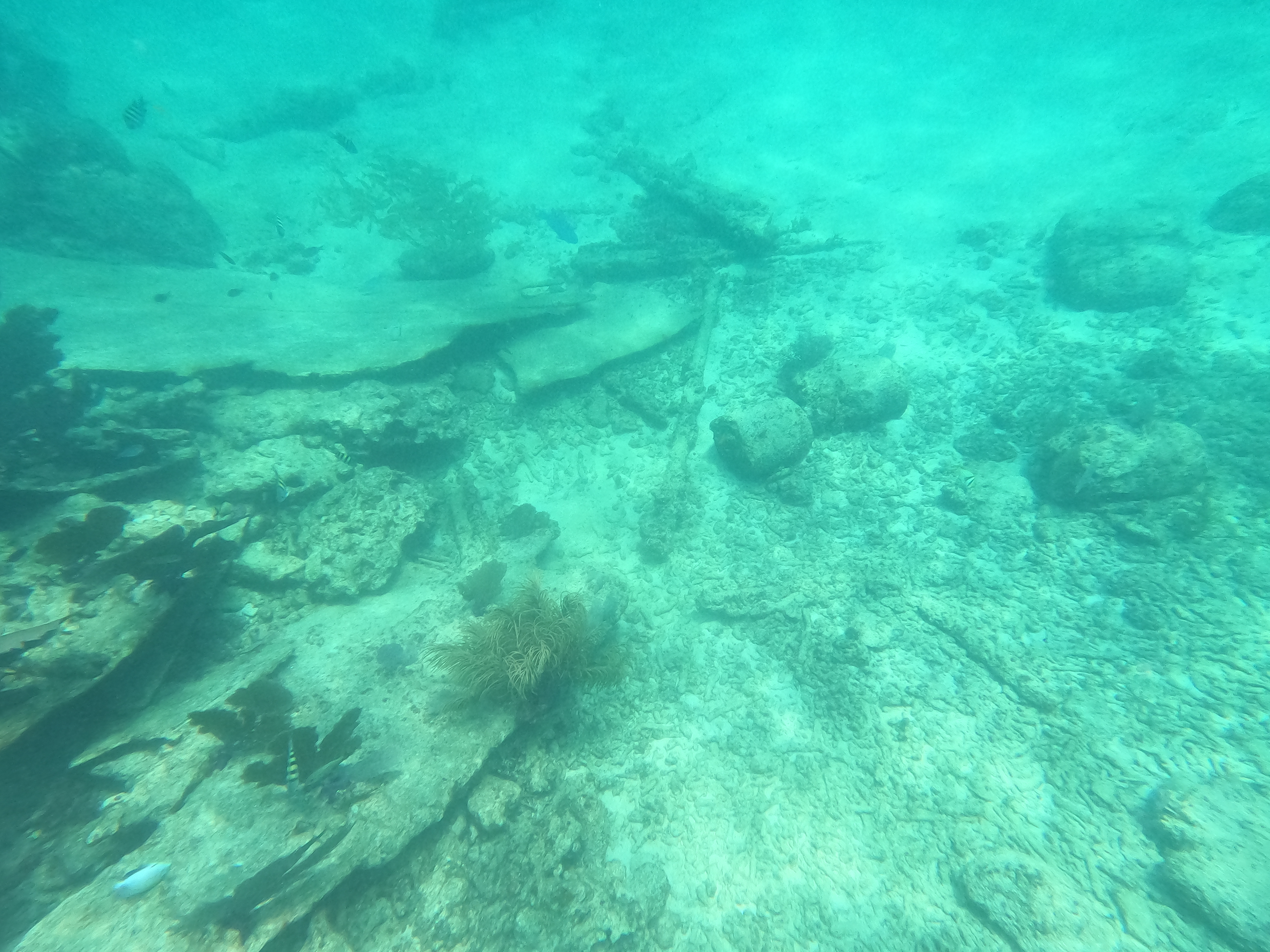
Part of the shipwreck, with some of the alleged barrels on the right, in 2023.
