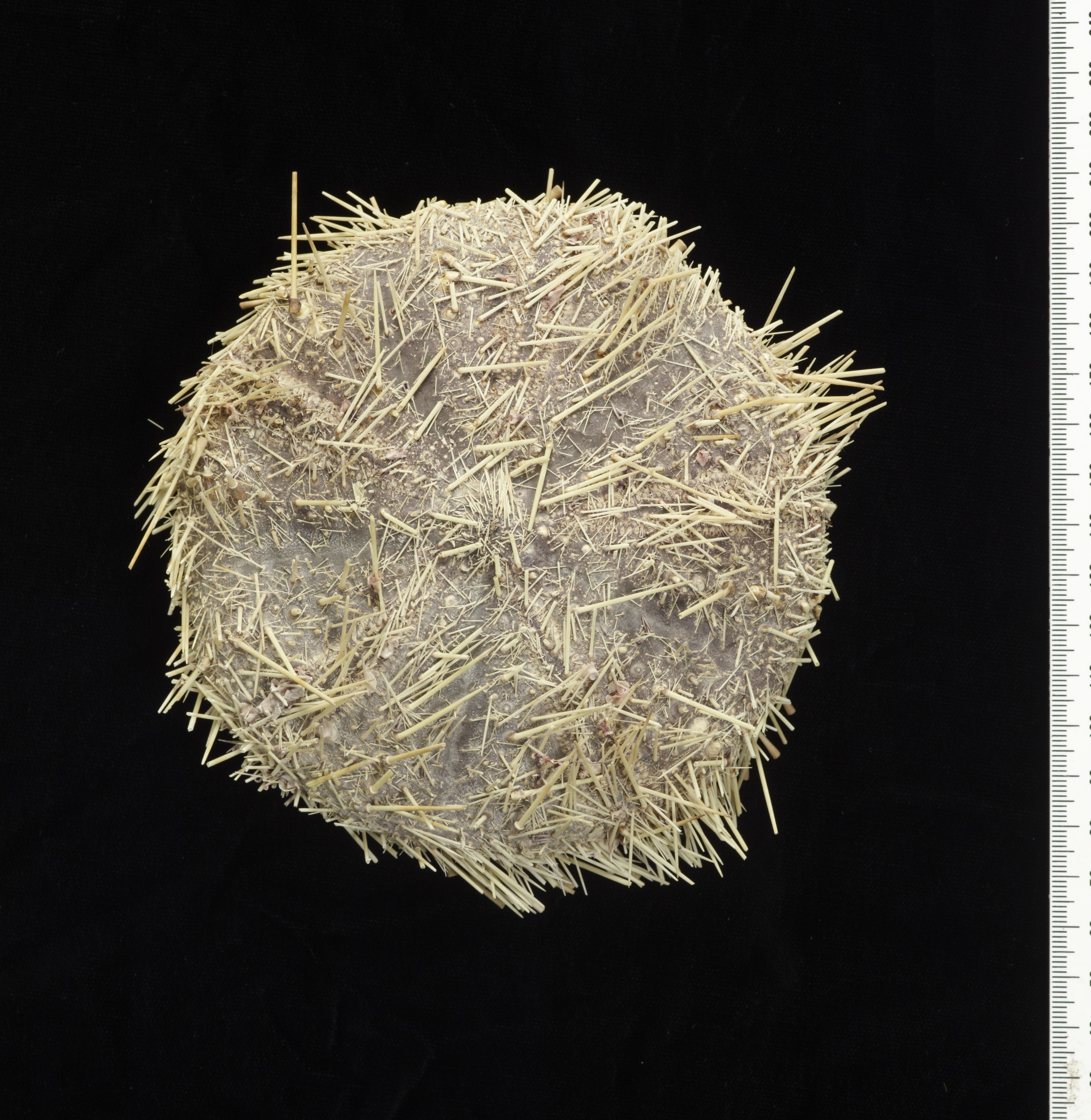
- Micropyga tuberculata

Scientific classification
- Domain: Eukaryota
- Kingdom: Animalia
- Phylum: Echinodermata
- Class: Echinoidea
- Order: Diadematoida
- Family: Micropygidae

Genera
- Kierechinus; Micropyga

= Micropygidae =

Family of sea urchins

The Micropygidae form a family of sea urchins within the Diadematoida order of echinoderms. The family contains two living species of the genus Micropyga and one, Kierechinus, known only from fossils. Morphologically, they are quite flat and have short, sharp spines, which are close to each other. They occur in the Indian and Pacific Oceans.

Genus	Author genus	Species	Author species	Age
Kierechinus	Philip, 1963	K. melo	(Kier, 1957)	Ypresian
Micropyga	Agassiz, 1879	M. tuberculata	Agassiz, 1879	extant
		M. violacea	de Meijere, 1903	extant
