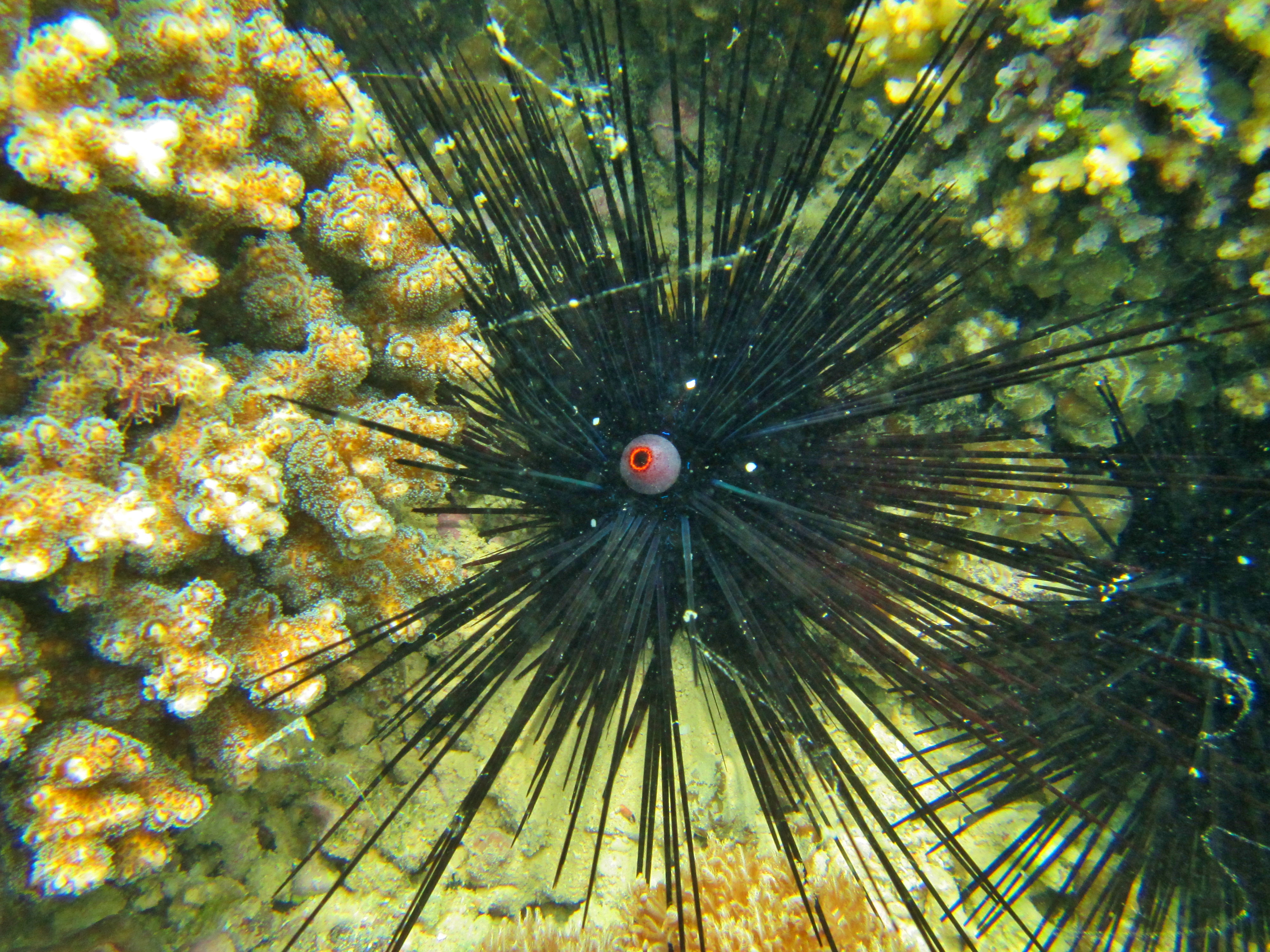
- Diadema setosum in Oman.

Scientific classification
- Kingdom: Animalia
- Phylum: Echinodermata
- Class: Echinoidea
- Order: Diadematoida
- Family: Diadematidae
- Genus: Diadema
- Species: D. setosum

Binomial name
- Diadema setosum Leske, 1778

Synonyms
- List: Centrechinus setosus (Leske, 1778); Centrostephanus setosum (Leske, 1778); Centrostephanus setosus (Leske, 1778); Cidaris tenuispina Philippi, 1845; Cidarites diadema (Gmelin, 1788); Diadema lamarcki (Gmelin, 1788); Diadema nudum A. Agassiz, 1863; Diadema saxatile (Linnaeus, 1758); Diadema setosa (Leske, 1778); Diadema setosum f. depressa Dollfus & Roman, 1981; Diadema turcarum Schynvoet, 1711; Echinometra setosa Rumphius, 1705; Echinus diadema Gmelin, 1788; Echinus saxatilis Linnaeus, 1758

= Diadema setosum =

Species of sea urchin

Diadema setosum is a species of long-spined sea urchin belonging to the family Diadematidae. It is a typical sea urchin, with extremely long, hollow spines that are mildly venomous. D. setosum differs from other Diadema with five, characteristic white dots that can be found on its body. The species can be found throughout the Indo-Pacific region, from Australia and Africa to Japan and the Red Sea. Despite being capable of causing painful stings when stepped upon, the urchin is only slightly venomous and does not pose a serious threat to humans.

== Description ==
As a member of the class Echinoidea, the anatomy of Diadema setosum is that of a typical sea urchin. All of the animal's internal organs are enclosed within the near-spherical, black test that is essentially the body and skeleton of the organism. However, the body is not perfectly spherical – Diadema tests are slightly dorso-ventrally compressed. Protruding outwards from the central body are the long spines iconic of a sea urchin's appearance. Like the other members of the family Diadematidae, the spines of D. setosum are extremely long and narrow in proportion to its body. The spines, often black but sometimes brown-banded, are hollow and contain a mild venom. D. setosum can be distinguished from other species in the genus Diadema by the presence of five white spots on the animal's test, strategically located between the urchin's ambulacral grooves.

In addition, a clear distinguishing characteristic of the species is the presence of a bright, orange ring around the urchin's periproctal cone (also known as the "anal cone"), which is often mistaken for an "eye". A few other minor characteristics in D. setosum include bluish spots on the organism's genital plates and similar blue spots (iridophores) arranged in linear fashion along its test. An apical ring is absent in the species, along with calcareous platelets on its apical cone. Sexually mature Diadema setosum specimens average from 35 to 80 grams (1.2 to 2.8 oz) in weight. Adults average a size of no more than 70 millimetres (2.8 in) in test diameter and around 40 millimetres (1.6 in) high.

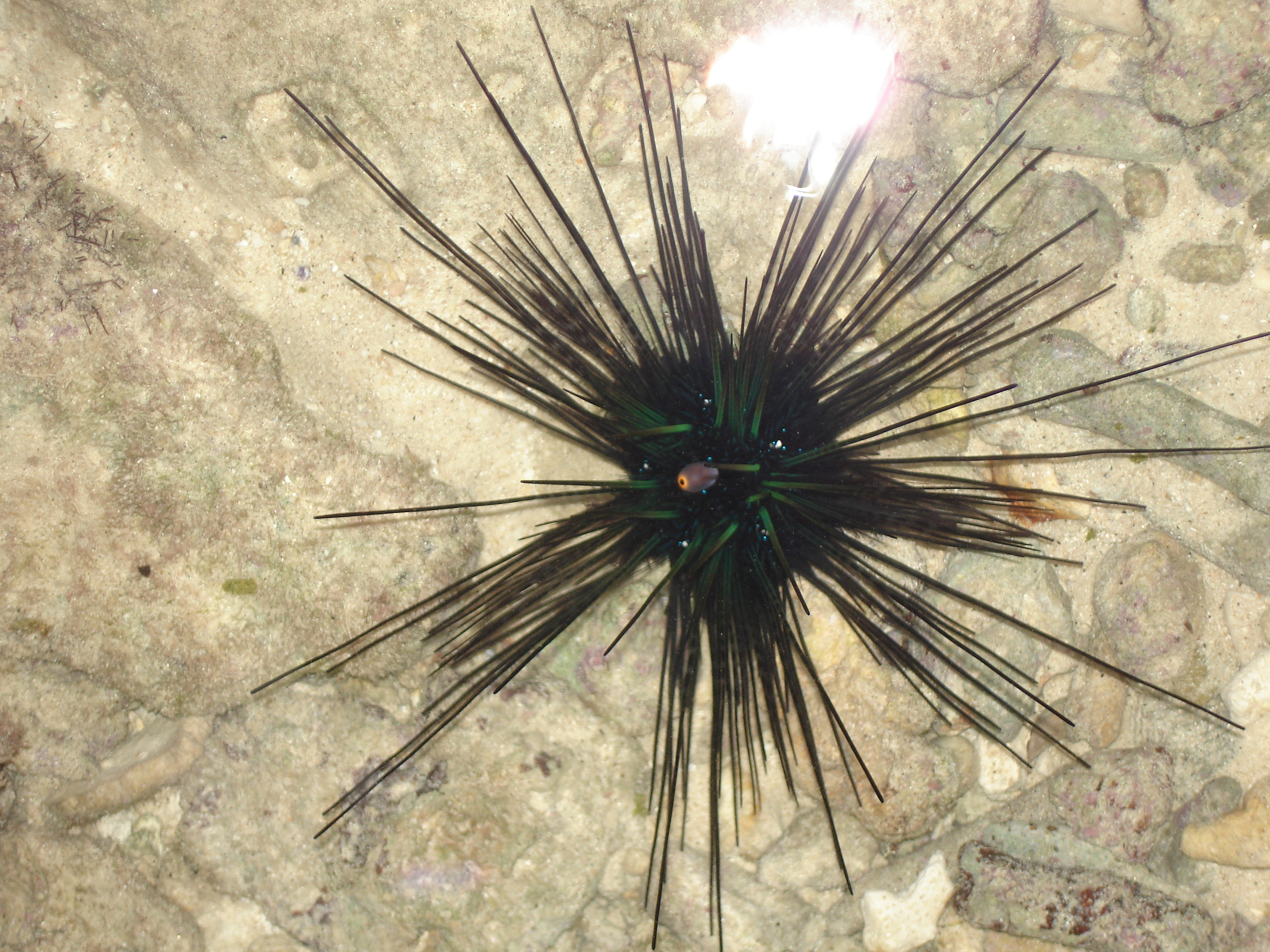
General look

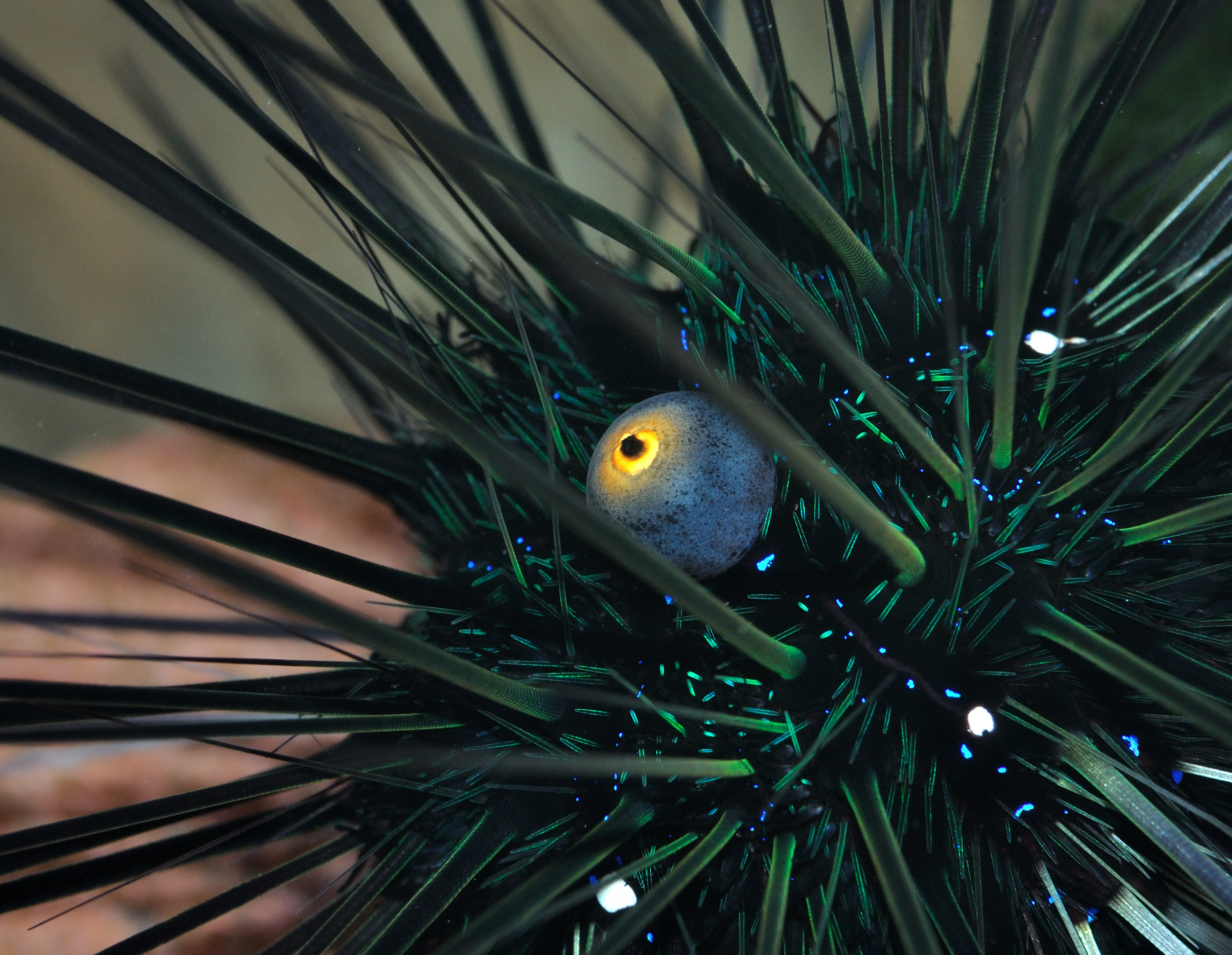
Detail of the anal papilla.

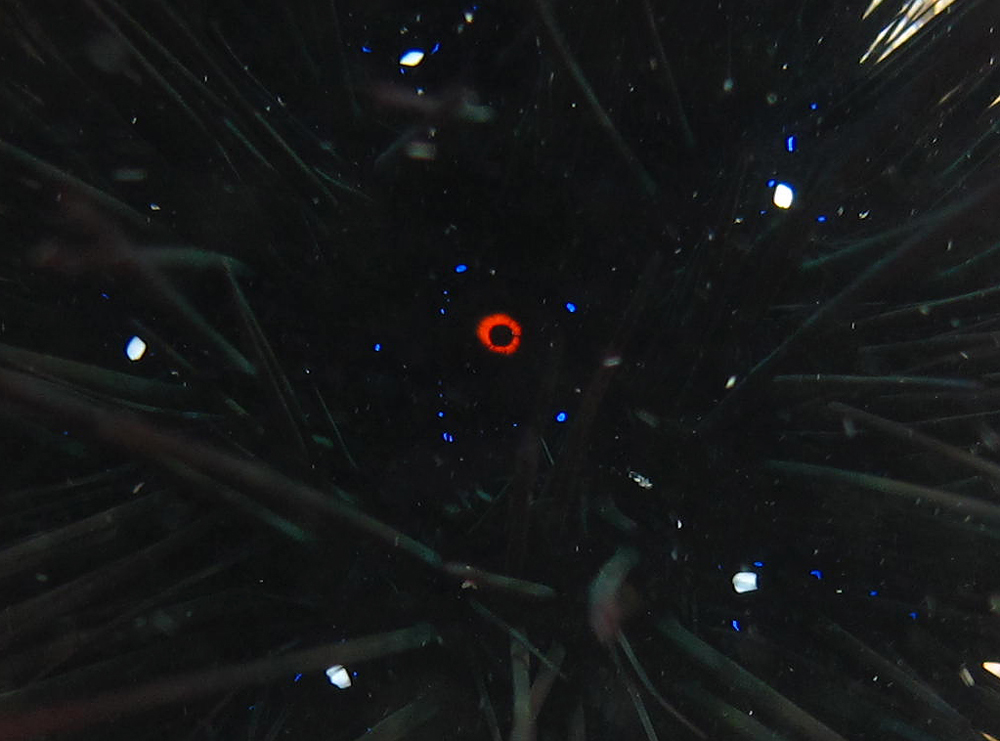
Close-up on the classical characteristics : orange ring, five white spots, blue iridophores.

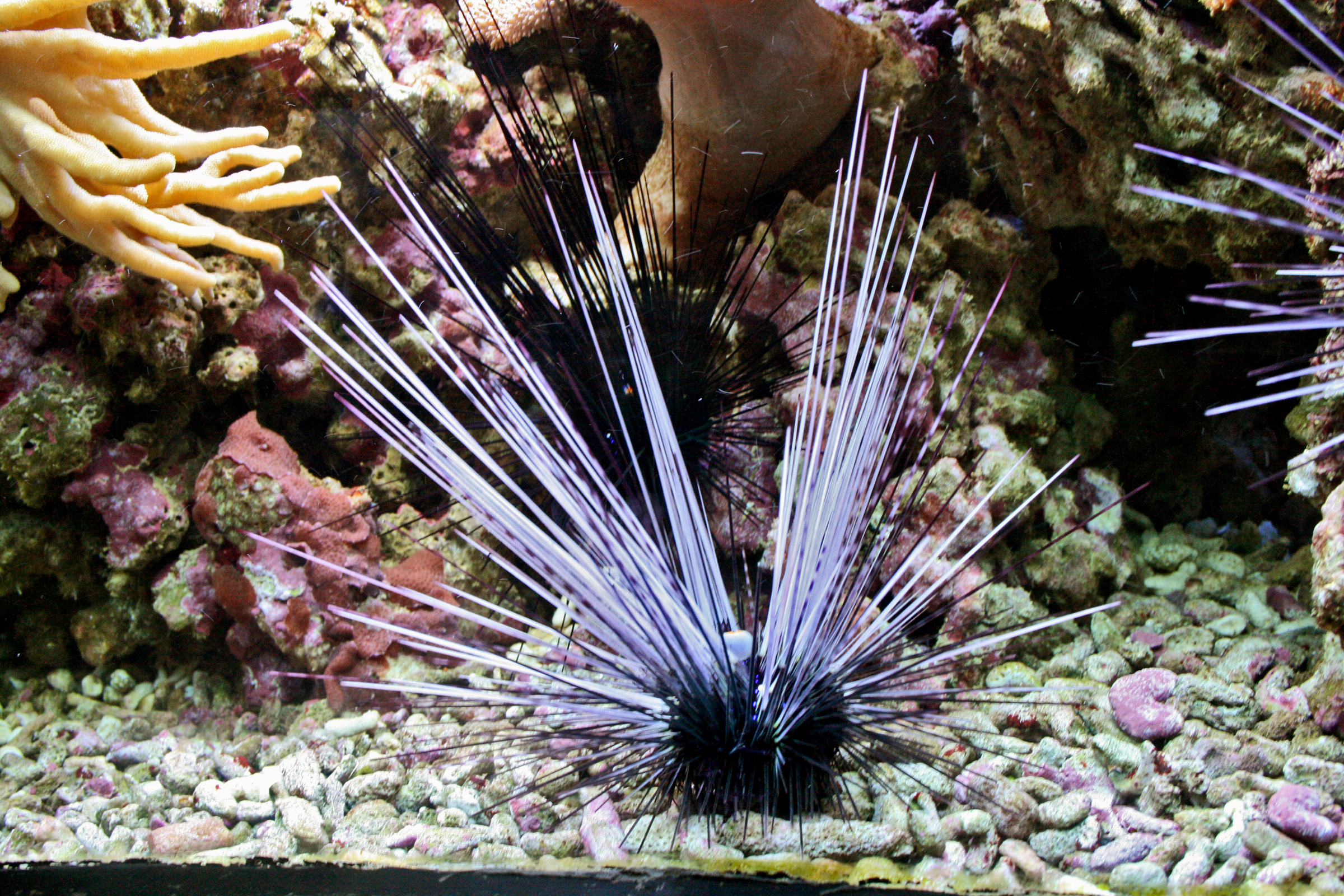
Specimen with white spines.

== Distribution and habitat ==
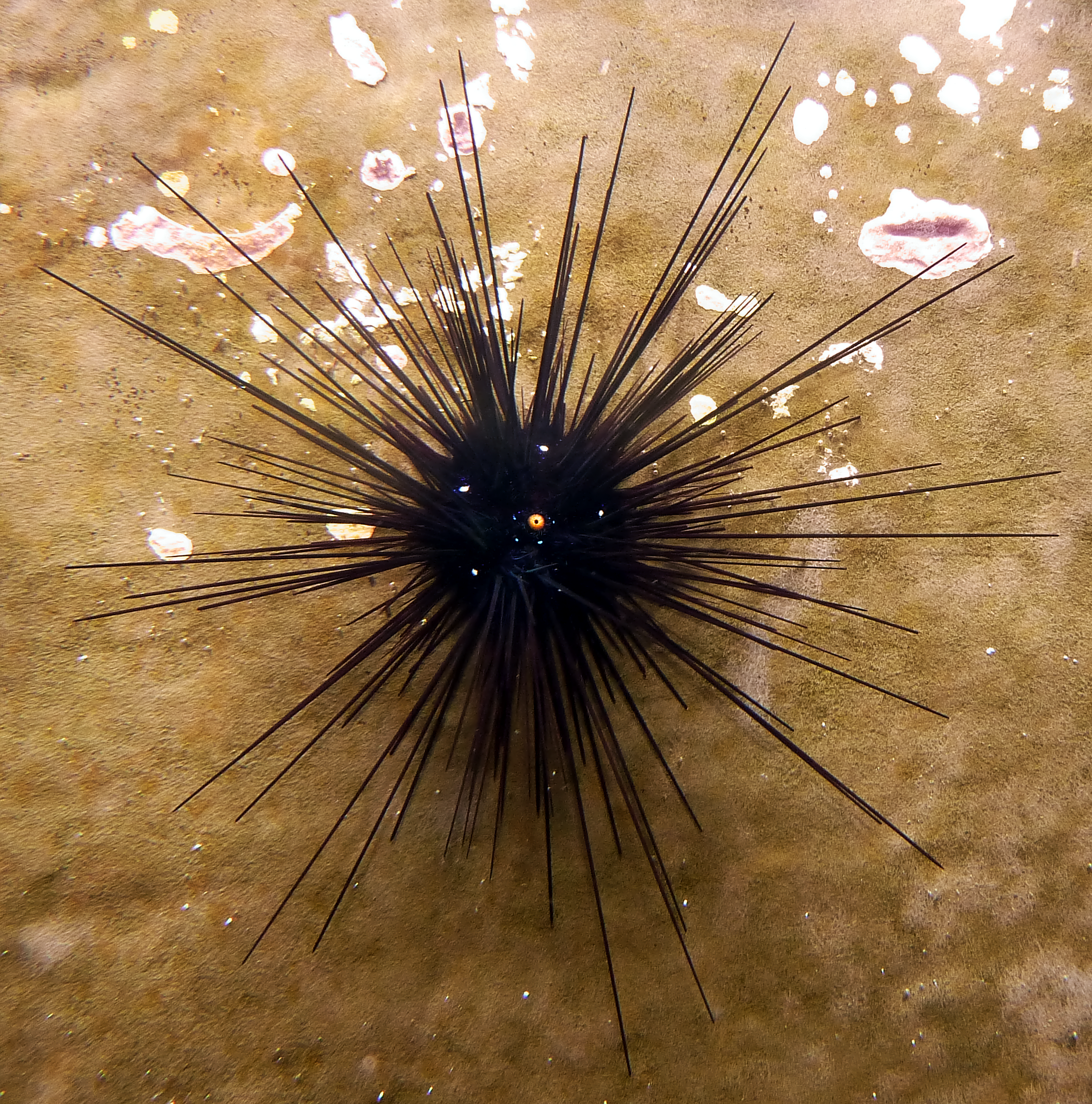
Diadema setosum, black spines color-morph

Diadema setosum is a widely distributed species of sea urchin. Its range stretches throughout the Indo-Pacific basin including Malaysia, longitudinally from the Red Sea and then eastward to the Australian coast. Latitudinally, the species can be found as far north as Japan and its range extends as far south as the southern tip of the African east coast.

The species has been introduced into other localities not within its natural range. In 2006, two living specimens of Diadema setosum were found in waters off the Kaş peninsula in Turkey. The discovery and subsequent collection of these individuals makes D. setosum the first invasive Erythrean sea urchin in the Mediterranean. Several hypotheses have been proposed for the finding of these individuals. Larvae of the species may have traveled through the Suez Canal (Lessepsian migration) into the Mediterranean from the Gulf of Suez, where the species has a thriving natural population. Another proposed vector is that of foreign ships bringing in individuals via their ballasts. A final possibility proposed was that the individual specimens were intentionally released by aquarists.

Diadema setosum is commonly associated with coral reefs, but is also found on sand flats and in seagrass beds. Along with the other members of the family, D. setosum is a prolific grazer. They are known to feed on a variety of algal species common on tropical coral reefs. The ecological importance of the taxon as a whole has been stressed because of its herbivorous habits.

In Hong Kong, Diadema setosum is omnipresent in rocky reefs, with a population density of up to one individual per 3.4m^{2}. The unusually large number of these urchins is theorised to be partly natural, and partly due to overfishing of its primary predator in the region, the blackspot tuskfish (Choerodon schoenleinii).

== Biology ==
The species has been known to spawn both seasonally and year-round depending on the location of the spawning population. It has been suggested that Diadema setosum populations are temperature-dependent in their spawning seasonalities. Temperatures higher than 25 °C (77 °F) have been cited as a possible spawning cue. Equatorial populations are those recorded to spawn at no particular times throughout the entire year. This is true for the Philippine populations of D. setosum. For a population in the Persian Gulf, spawning occurs during the months of April to May. Other cues, such as the phases of the moon have been observed to affect the spawning of D. setosum populations. The species has been found to trigger spawning events in concordance with the appearance of a full moon. They are broadcast spawners.

Evolutionarily, Diadema setosum is considered one of the oldest of the known extant species in the genus Diadema. Genetic analysis of the Diadema have placed D. setosum at a basal branch on a cladogram, having it as the sister group to all the other remaining members of the genus. Morphological analysis confirms this conclusion, adding weight to the concept of D. setosum being the most basal of the Diadema and possibly the oldest extant species in the genus.

Like other venomous sea urchins, the venom of Diadema setosum is only mild and not at all fatal to humans. The toxin mostly causes swelling and pain and gradually diffuses over several hours. More danger is presented by the delivery system – the urchin's spines which are extremely brittle and needle-like. They easily break off within flesh and are quite a challenge to extract.

In terms of behavior, D. setosum has been observed to be able to avoid danger by rapidly inverting its body and "running" on the tips of its longest spines. This behavior is triggered by sudden impacts and the snapping of one or more of its spines. During the process, upon encountering small obstacles, D. setosum will adopt a rolling motion. It has been observed to move 30 in (760 millimetres) in just 7 seconds using this method of locomotion.

While D. setosum doesn't have an 'eye', it has basic extraocular vision; D. setosum is one of few species of urchin that was determined to have a diffuse photoreceptor system that provides both illumination levels and spatial information, allowing the urchin to detect objects of different sizes and color.

Goose barnacles of the genus Microlepas are known to parasitize D. setosum.

== Gallery ==
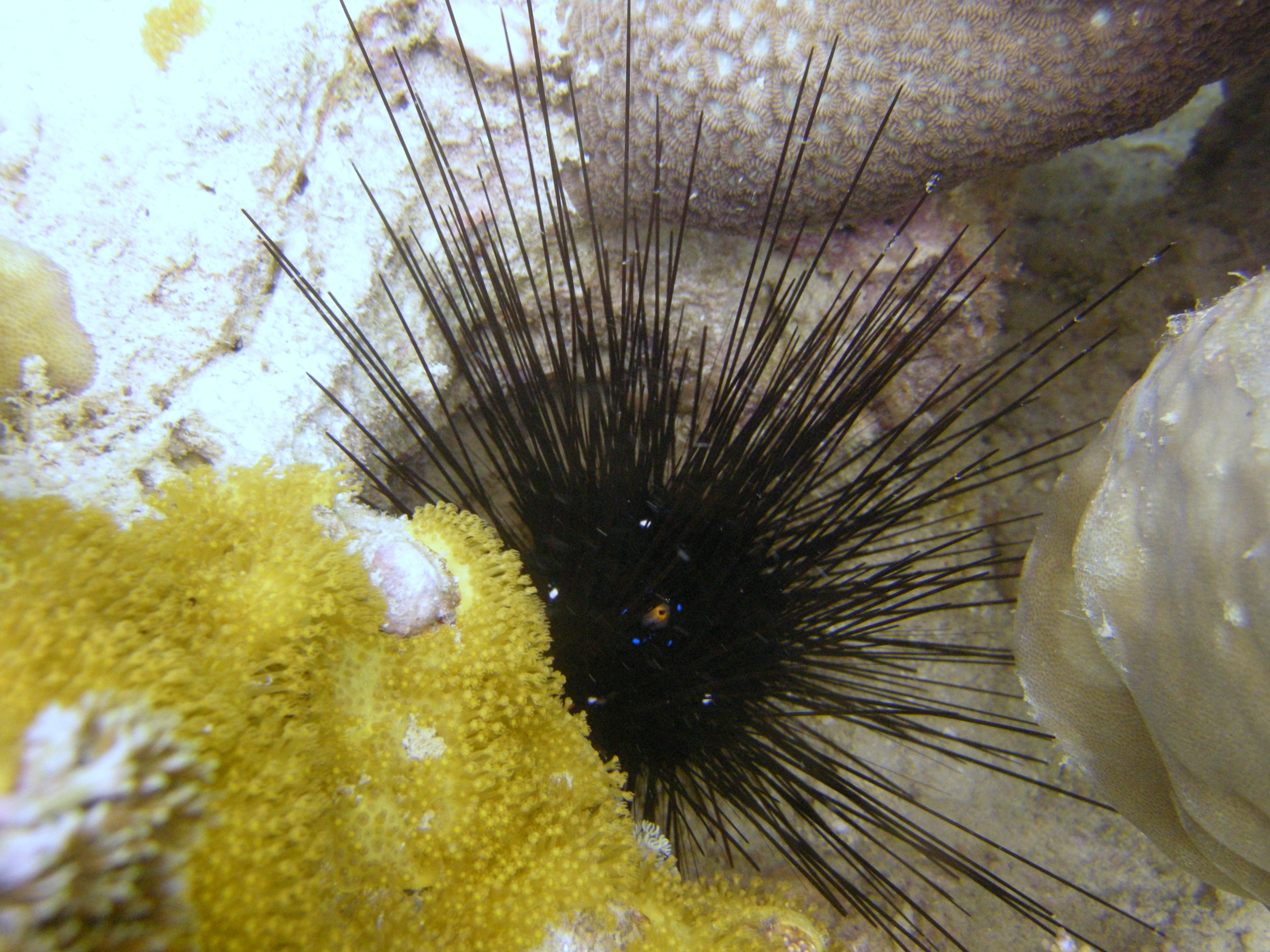
From Zanzibar

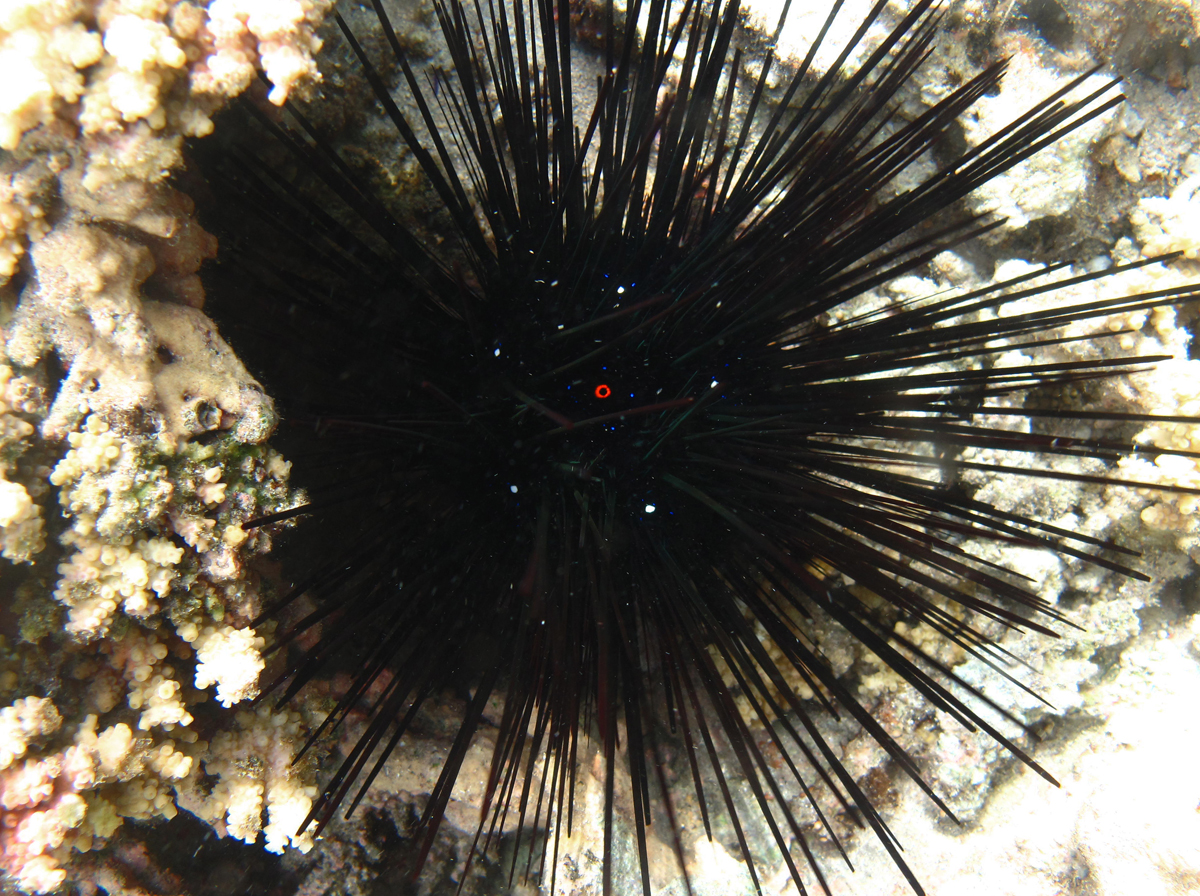
From la Réunion

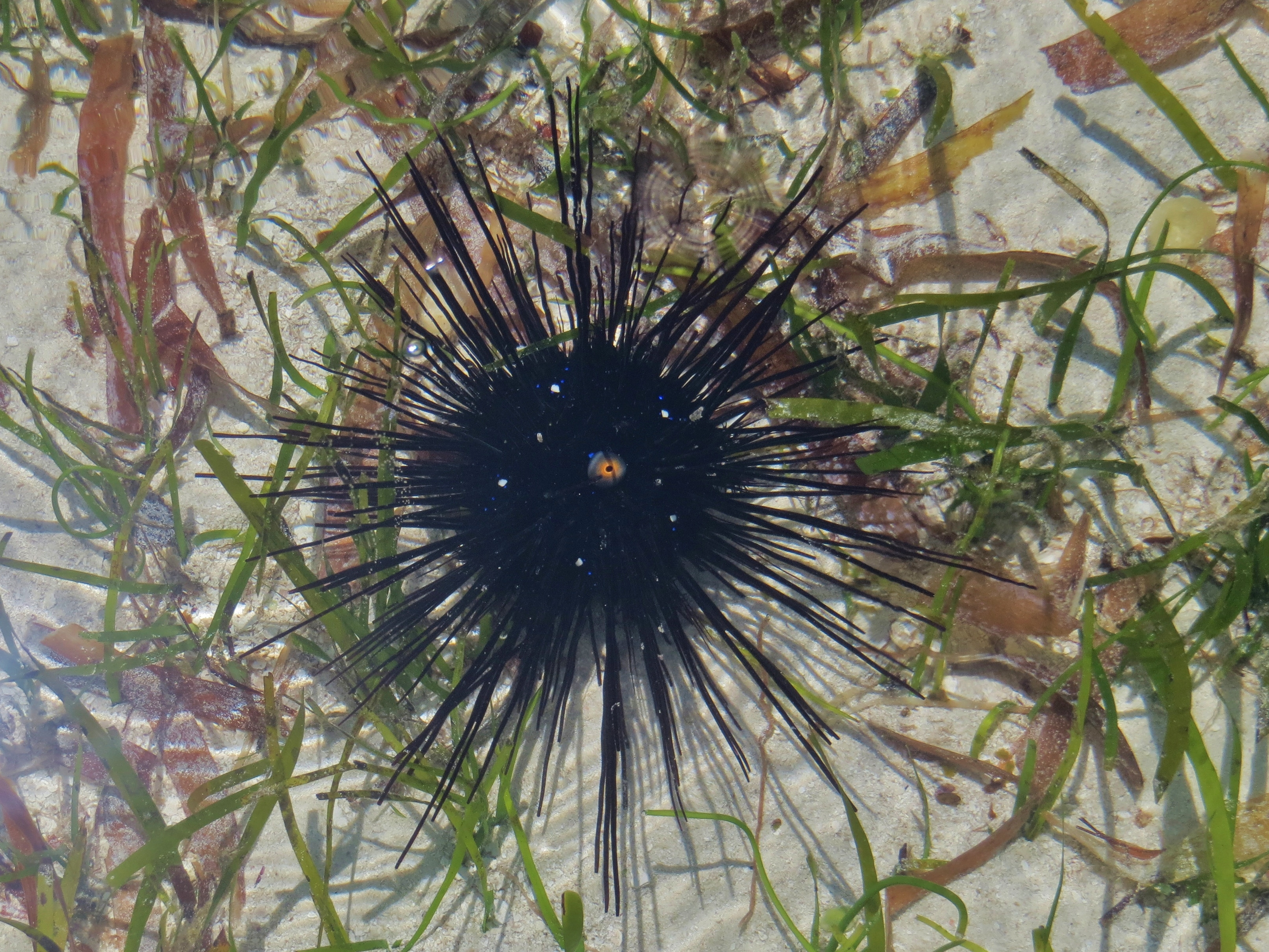
A specimen encountered in Kenya. The 5-fold symmetry is obvious.

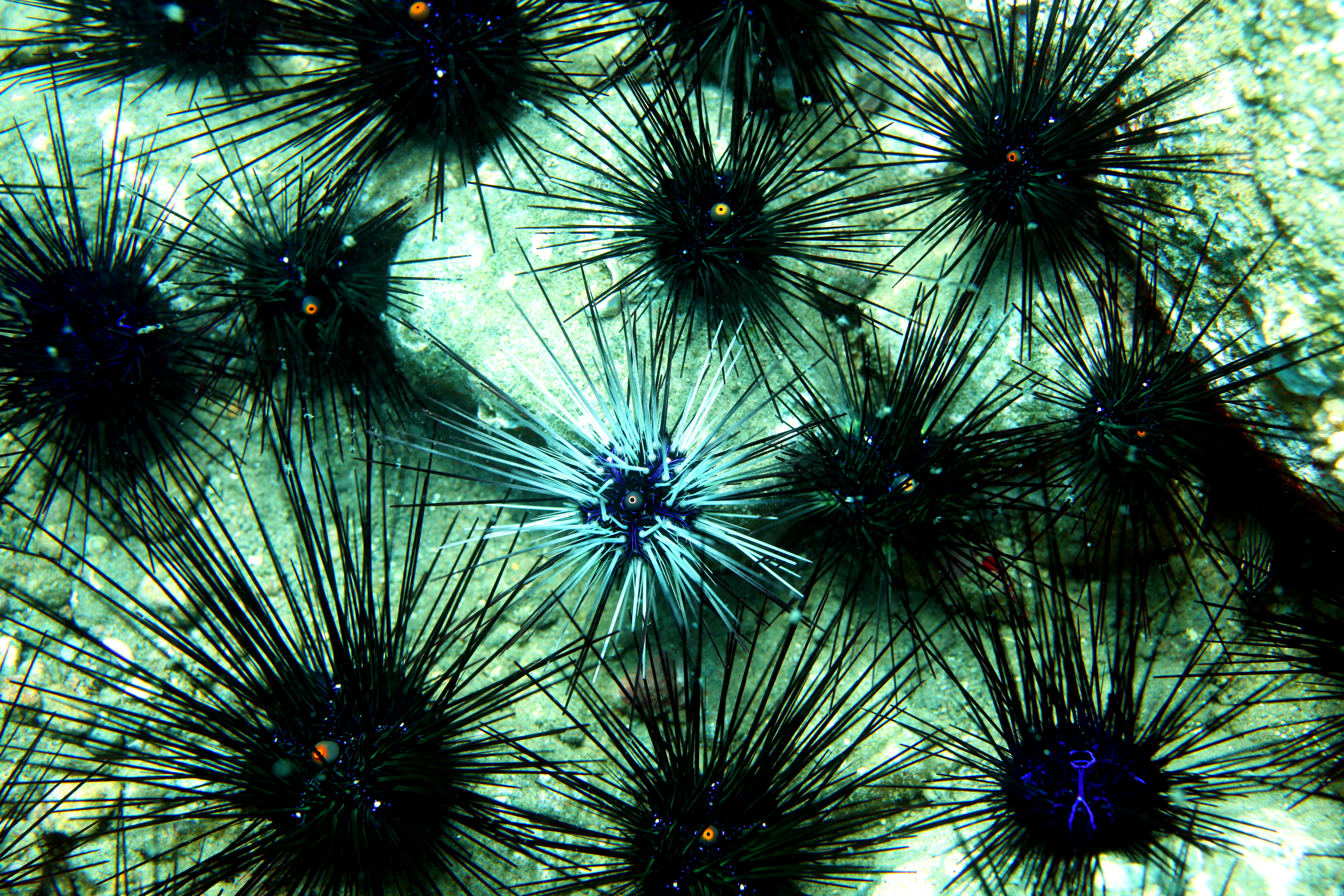
D. setosum along with Diadema savignyi : test shape, spines length and orange ring help telling them apart.

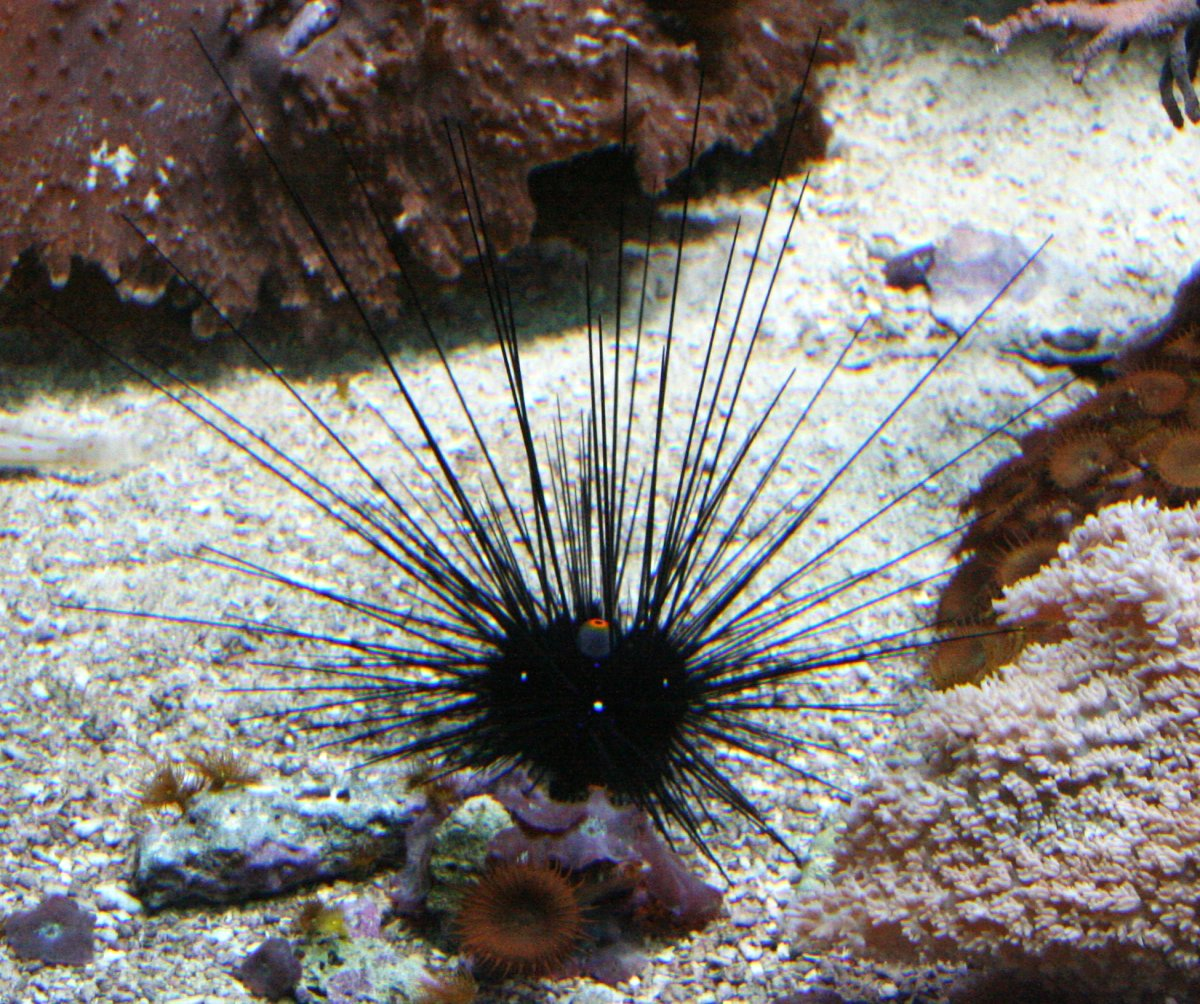
A classical specimen with long, black spines. The characteristic orange ring is visible in the photo.

== Bibliography ==
- Alsaffar, Adel H.; Khalid P. Lone (2000). "Reproductive cycles of Diadema setosum and Echinometra mathaei (Echinoidea: Echinodermata) from Kuwait (Northern Arabian Gulf)". Bulletin of Marine Science. 67 (2): 845–856.
