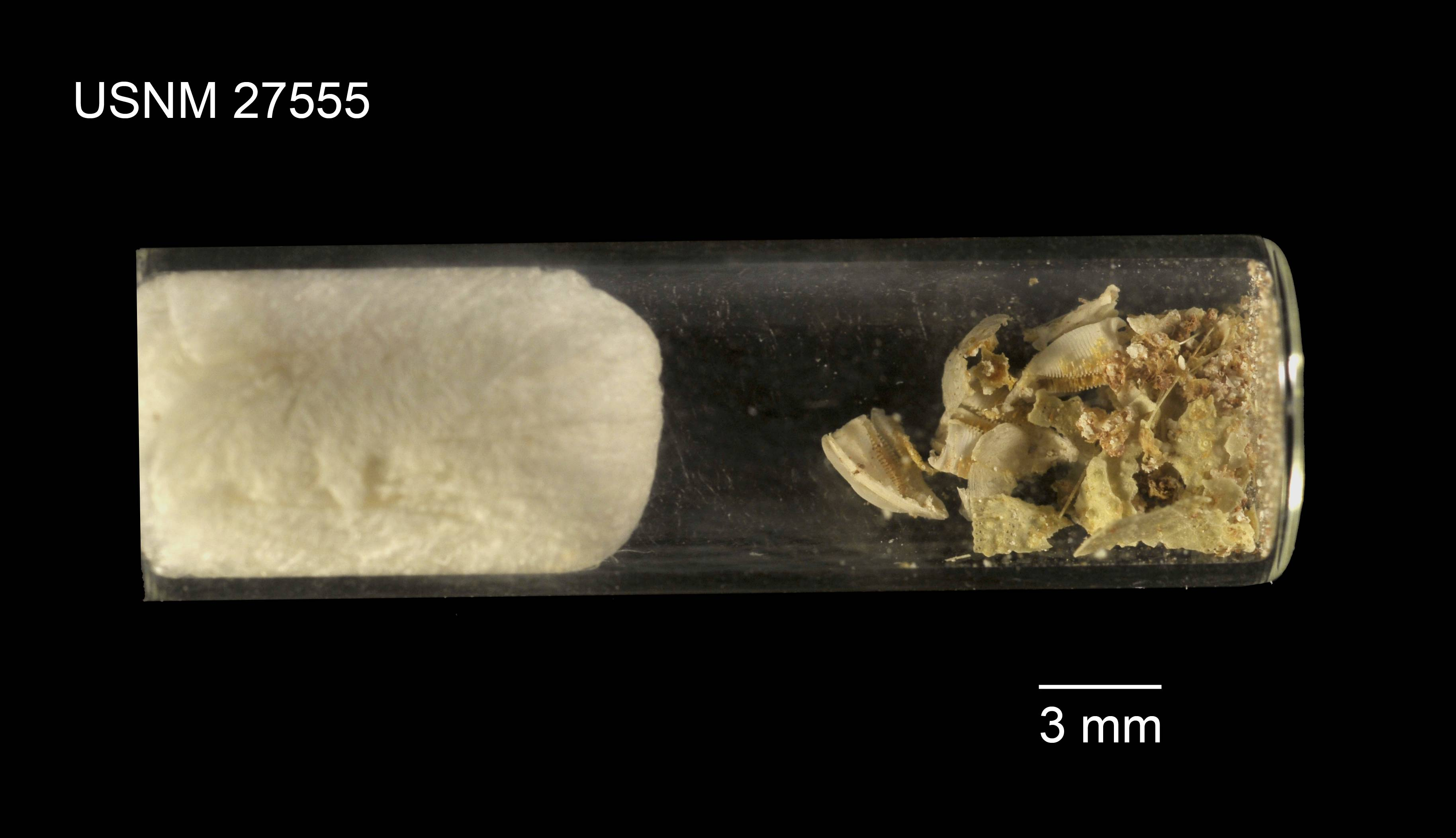
- Leptodiadema purpureum

Scientific classification
- Domain: Eukaryota
- Kingdom: Animalia
- Phylum: Echinodermata
- Class: Echinoidea
- Order: Diadematoida
- Family: Lissodiadematidae
- Genus: Lissodiadema; Mortensen, 1903

Species
- L. lorioli; L. purpureum

= Lissodiadema =

Genus of sea urchins

Lissodiadema is the only genus in the family Lissodiadematidae.

Genus	Author genus	Species	Author species	Age
Lissodiadema	Mortensen, 1903	L. lorioli	Mortensen, 1903	extant
		L. purpureum	Agassiz & Clark, 1907	extant
