= Snapper Ledge =

Coral reef in the Florida Keys, US

- Location within Florida Location within the Caribbean

Location
- Location: Caribbean
- Coordinates: 25°00′00″N 80°25′00″W
- Country: United States

Geology
- Type: reef

Snapper Ledge is a small coral reef located within the Florida Keys National Marine Sanctuary. It lies to the southeast of Key Largo, to the south the Key Largo Existing Management Area and John Pennekamp Coral Reef State Park. Unlike many reefs within the Sanctuary, this reef is not within a Sanctuary Preservation Area (SPA). It is near Pickles Reef. Since 2009, the Coral Restoration Foundation has used Snapper Ledge as a nursery site to grow Elkhorn coral (Acropora palmata).

== Gallery ==
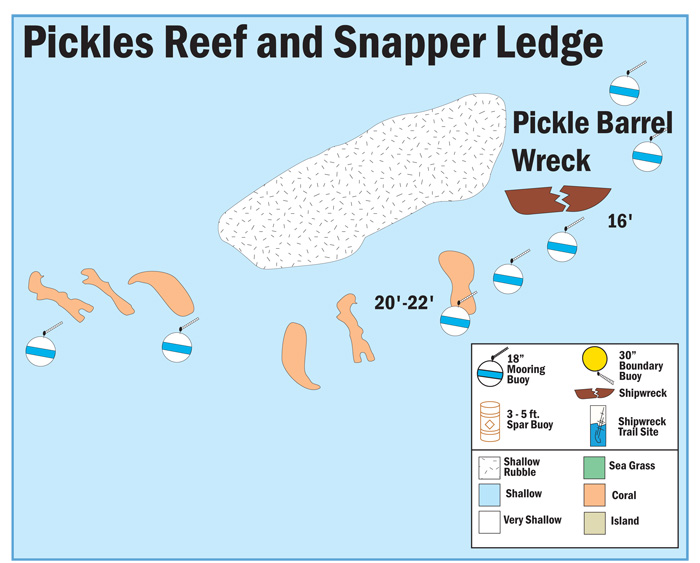
Buoys at Pickles Reef and Snapper Ledge

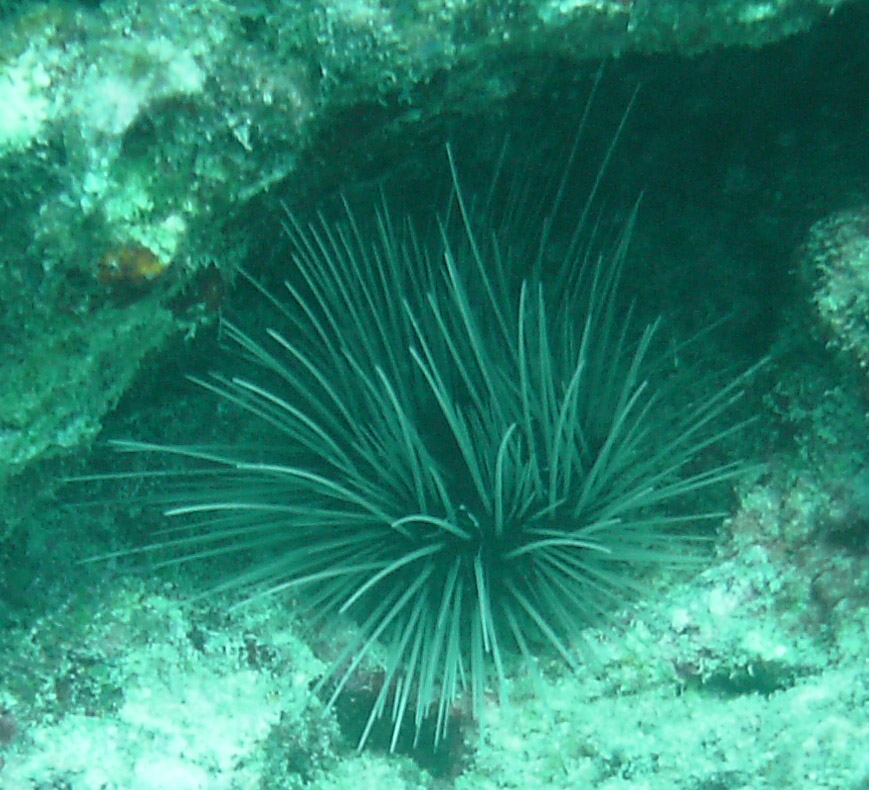
Diadema antillarum with unusual grey spines at Snapper Ledge

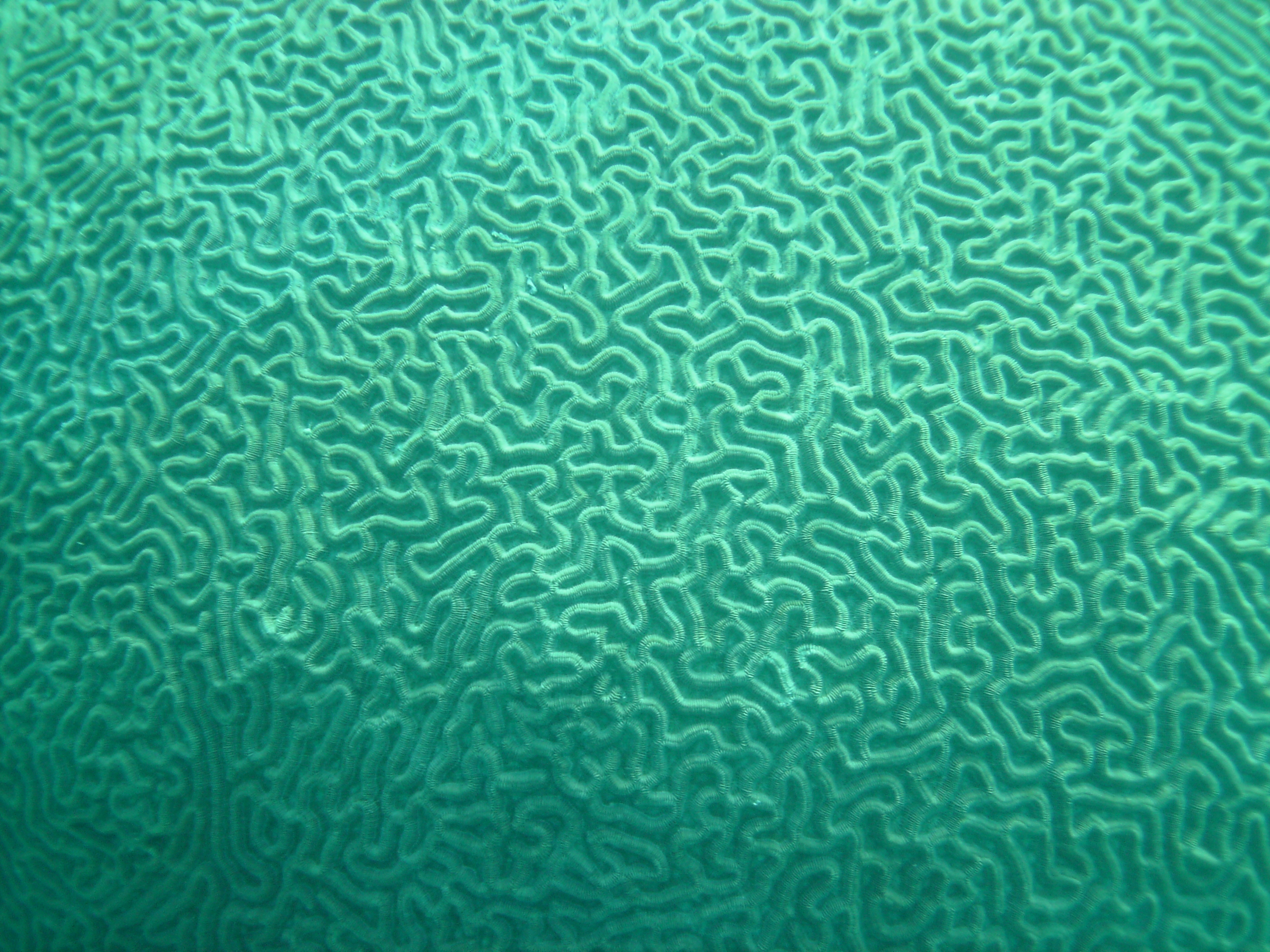
Closeup of the very large brain coral, Diploria strigosa, at Snapper Ledge

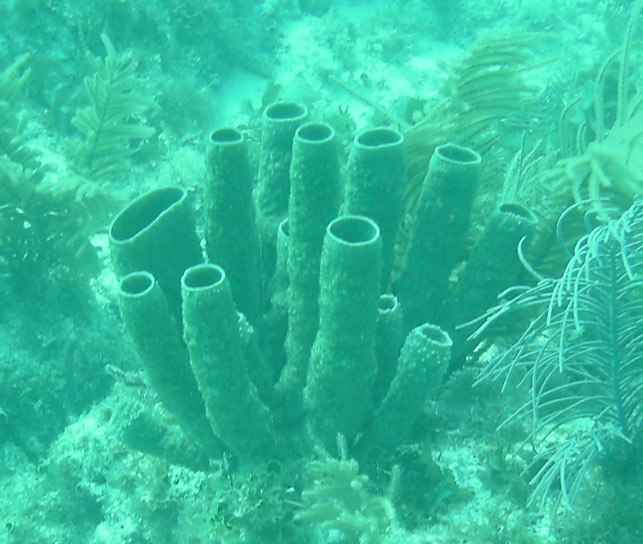
Tube sponge, Agelas conifera at Snapper Ledge
