= Wireless Amateur Network of Amaliada =

- Network Name (short): WANA
- Location: Peloponnese, Greece
- Home page: http://www.wana.gr/
- Nodes database: WANA database
- Operational: Yes
- Commercial: No

The Wireless Amateur Network of Amaliada a.k.a. WANA, is a 5.4 GHz wireless network located in Amaliada, Greece. The network links many users from several areas of the town and suburbs as it offers broadband services always by encountering the settings for safe telecommunications as they are defined by Greek National Board of Telecommunications and Posts. There are over 40 similar communities in other Greek cities, a statistic information that makes Greece a pioneer in wireless networking. WANA is a non-commercial, scientific and technological club. The full appellation of it is "Wireless Amateur Network of Amaliada" or in Greek "Ασύρματο Ερασιτεχνικό Δίκτυο Αμαλιάδας" which was established in 2006 with its headquarters placed in Amaliada of Ilia County. At this moment it offers free wireless access to the city community from the more than seven hotspots which they are installed around the city and its suburbs. There is also a core of users in the nearby city of Gastouni that soon will be connected with the network by a dedicated link, the wireless dedicated link with the Wireless Metropolitan Network of Patras lies in its final level.
