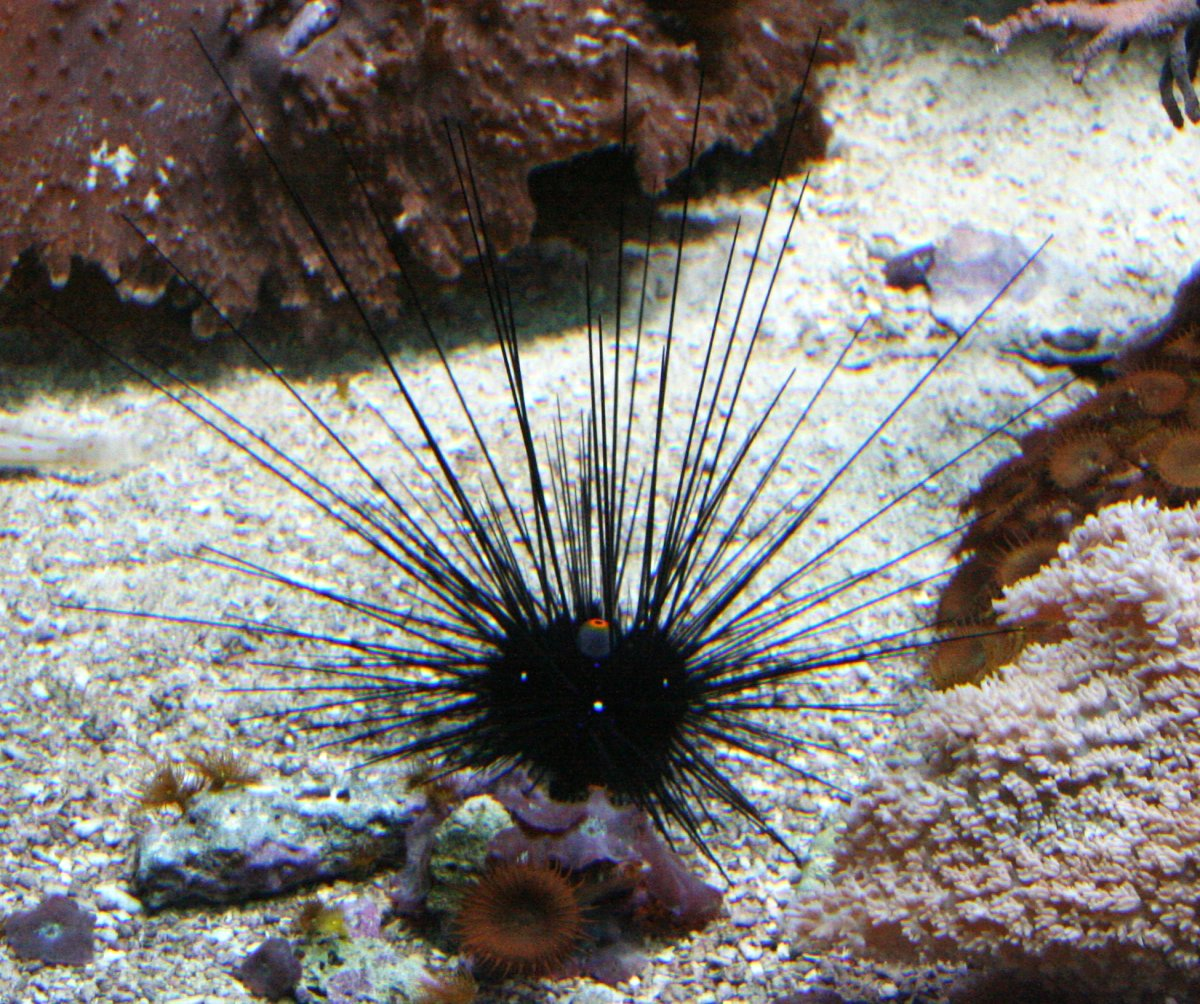
- Diadema setosum

Scientific classification
- Kingdom: Animalia
- Phylum: Echinodermata
- Class: Echinoidea
- Superorder: Diadematacea
- Order: Diadematoida; Duncan, 1889

Families
- See text

= Diadematoida =

Diadematoida Temporal range: Early Jurassic–Recent

Order of sea urchins

The Diadematoida are an order of sea urchins. They are distinguished from other sea urchins by the fact that their spines are hollow, or at best have an open mesh at the core, and by the presence of 10 buccal plates around the mouth. Their tests can be either solid or flexible.

== Taxonomy ==
According to ITIS:

- family Aspidodiadematidae (Duncan, 1889)
- family Diadematidae (Gray, 1855)
- family Lissodiadematidae (Mortensen, 1903)
- family Micropygidae (Duncan, 1889)

According to World Register of Marine Species:

- family Diadematidae (Gray, 1855)
