= NOAAS Okeanos Explorer Gulf of Mexico 2017 Expedition =

Expedition on the NOAAS Okeanos Explorer

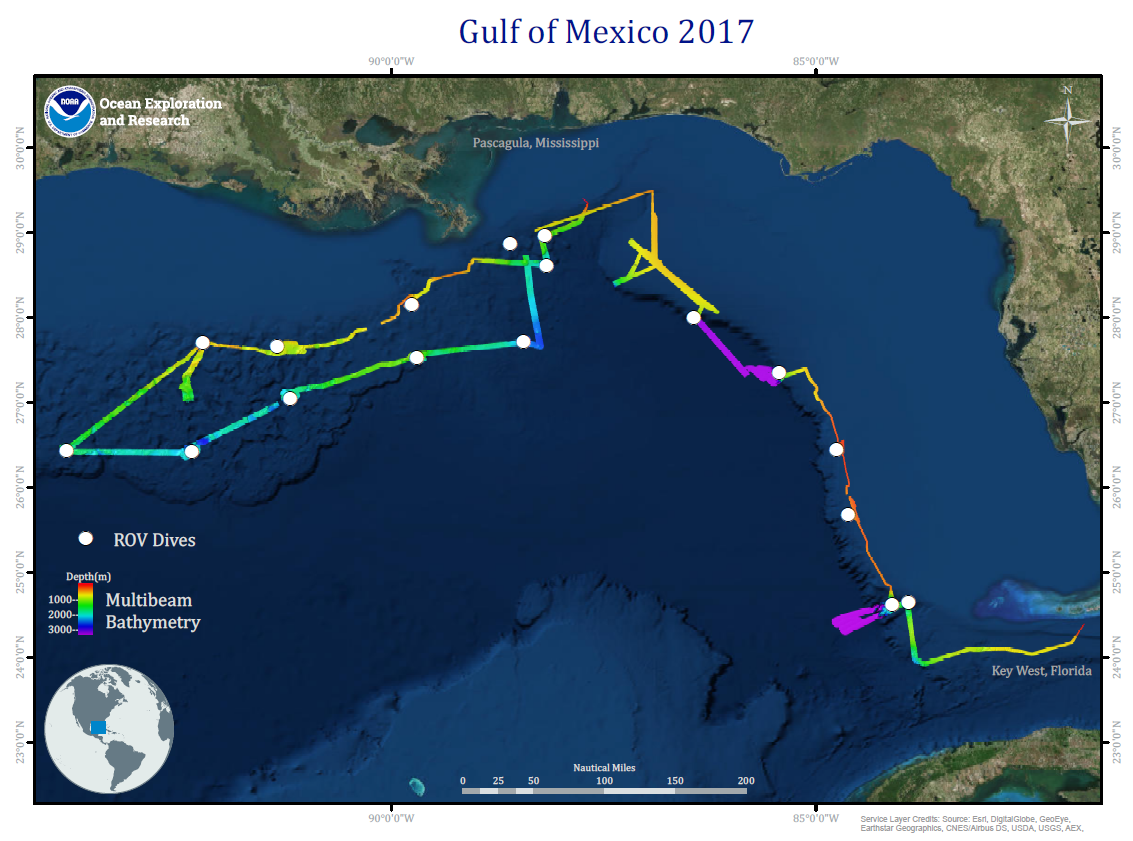
Map of the general expedition operating area

NOASS Okeanos Explorer Gulf of Mexico 2017 Expedition was the first of three expeditions on the NOAAS Okeanos Explorer intended to increase the understanding of the deep-sea environment in the Gulf of Mexico. Gulf of Mexico 2017 was a 23-day telepresence-enabled expedition focused on acquiring data on priority exploration areas identified by ocean management and scientific communities. The goal of the expedition was to use remotely operated vehicle (ROV) dives and seafloor mapping operations to increase the understanding of the deep-sea ecosystems in these areas to support management decisions. Many of the areas had no (or low quality) sonar data, these areas were top priority for high-resolution bathymetry collection. The expedition established a baseline of information in the region to catalyze further exploration, research, and management activities. The expedition lasted from 29 November 2017 to 21 December 2017.

Through discussions and information stemming from NOAA and other stakeholders, priority areas of exploration had been identified. The expedition explored deep coral and sponge communities, bottom fish habitats, seamounts, undersea canyons, shipwrecks, and a variety of chemosynthetic habitats including cold seeps, mud volcanoes and brine pools. Using NOAA Ship Okeanos Explorer's unique capabilities, scientists and other audiences onshore were provided with real-time video footage from deep-water areas in important, yet largely unknown, U.S. waters.

== ROV Dives ==
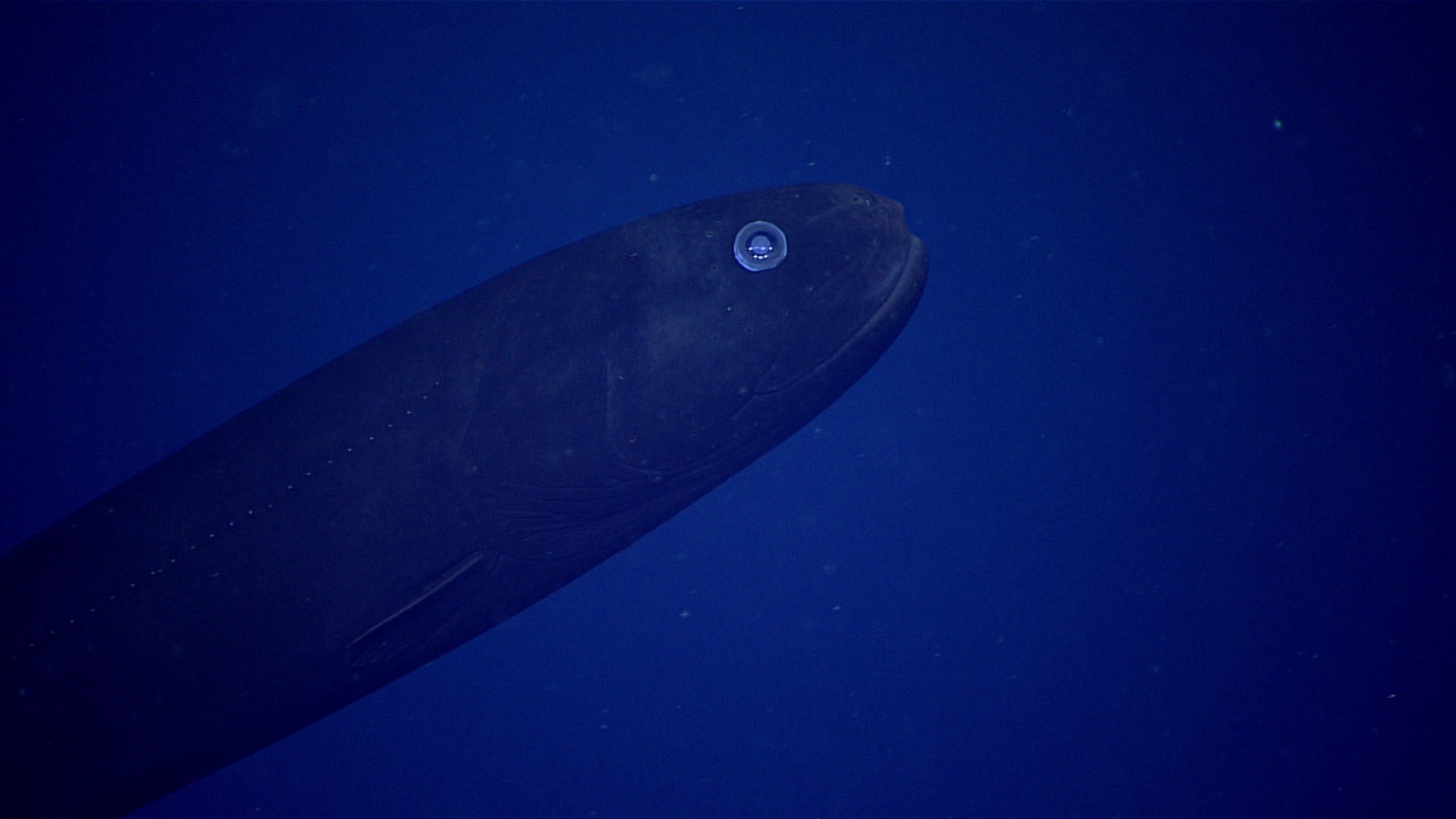
Fish experts on the global midwater team were blown away by the appearance of this fish from the genus Leptochilichthys. The observation placed this fish at a shallow depth of 900 meters, when typical observations place this fish squarely in the bathypelagic zone at ~2,000 meters.

17 ROV dives were conducted from 300 to 2,321 meters of depth to explore the diversity and distribution of deep-sea habitats and associated marine communities in the Gulf of Mexico basin. There were also four midwater exploration dives conducted at depths of 300 to 900 meters to investigate the diversity and abundance of the largely unknown pelagic fauna. During these dives hundreds of different species of animals were observed including several potential new species. Several significant range extensions were observed and several organisms were seen alive for the first time. 105 biological samples (32 primary and 73 associated and commensal taxa) were collected several of which came from unknown species. As well as biological samples eight rock samples and one sediment sample were collected for use in geochemical composition analysis and age dating. Several dives gathered geological data to better understand the geological composition and origin of the Florida Escarpment.

At least 20 previously unknown chemosynthetic habitats were discovered including methane seeps (some with visible methane hydrate), asphalt seeps, and brine rivers. Most of these had associated chemosynthetic communities that included large siboglinid tubeworm bushes and extensive mussel beds. There were also many areas of reduced sediments and bacterial mats. Asphaltic and authigenic carbonate outcrops hosting large filter-feeding communities were also observed in geologically active areas.

A number of the ROV dives surveyed Habitat Areas of Particular Concern (HAPCs) proposed by the Gulf of Mexico Fishery Management Council. These surveys collected baseline information for management of the area. Six proposed expansions zones to the Flower Garden Banks National Marine Sanctuary were explored and surveyed to gather information on future expansion of the sanctuary. Many high-diversity and density coral and sponge communities were discovered in these areas including a Madrepora oculata-dominated coral garden.

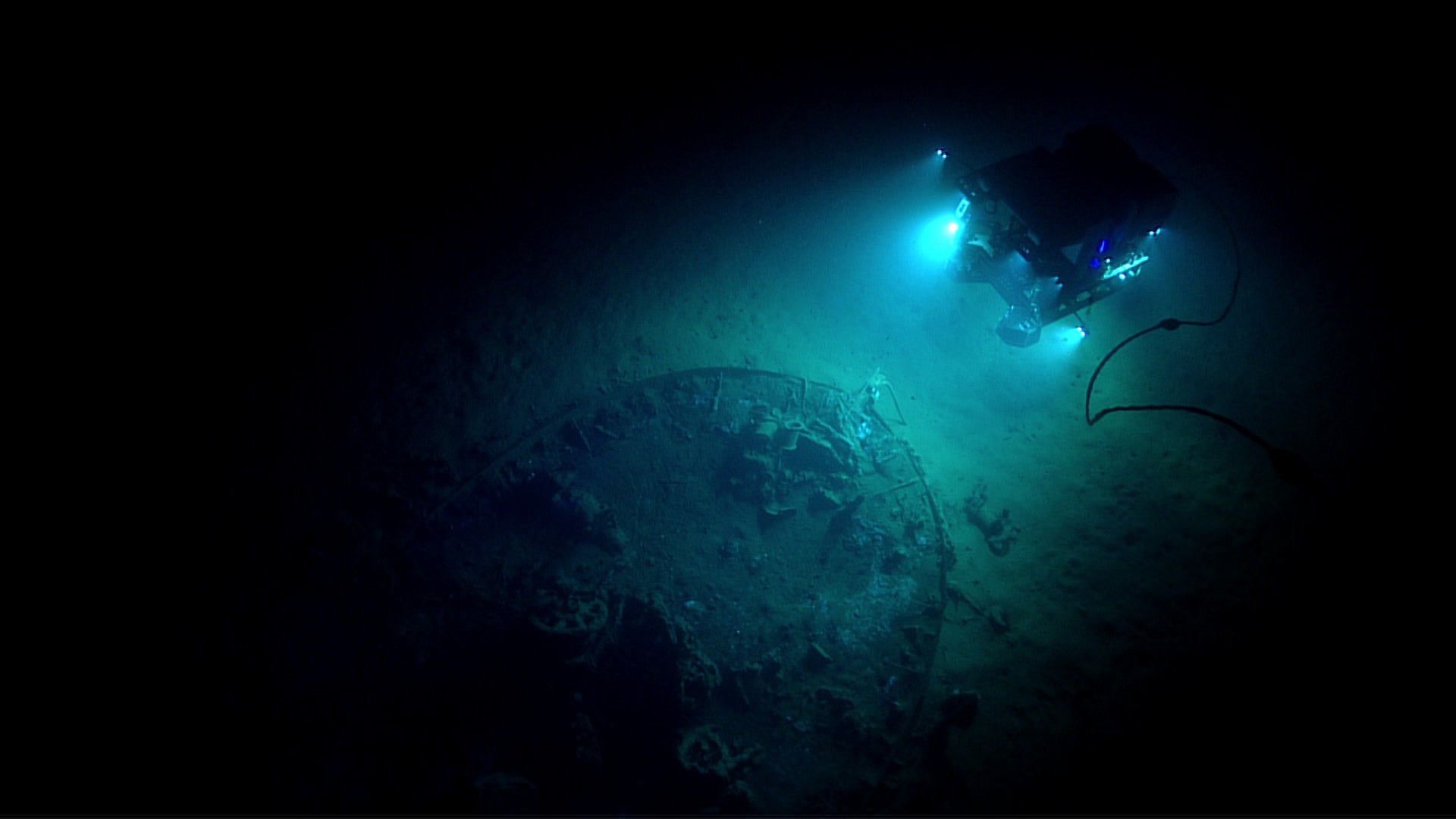
During Dive 7, Deep Discoverer explored an unknown shipwreck identified by the Bureau of Ocean Energy Management simply as “ID Number 15377.” .

The wreck of an early 19th-century copper-clad merchant vessel carrying artifacts including glass bottles, ceramic and porcelain vessels, remnants of a suction bilge pump with cast-iron flywheels, an anchor, and a cast-iron stove was surveyed and explored. Based on initial observations, archaeologists believe the shipwreck likely post-dates 1830 and may have been a merchant ship built for distance over speed.

During one of the dives Enypniastes eximia was spotted on the ocean floor.

=== Gas Hydrate ===
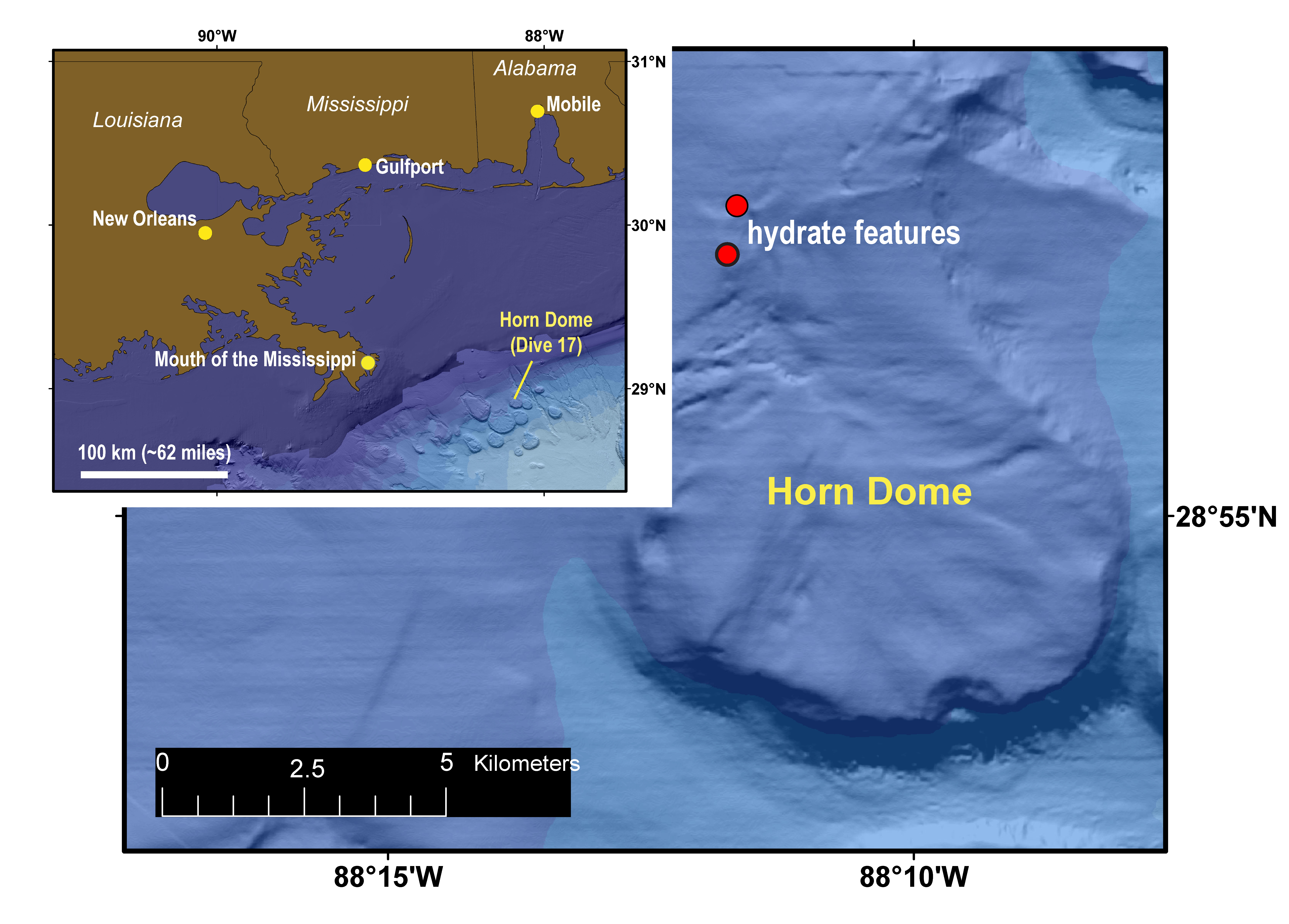
Dive 17 explored the northwest part of Horn Dome, a salt-cored bathymetric high that had been the focus of several previous remotely operated vehicle dives.

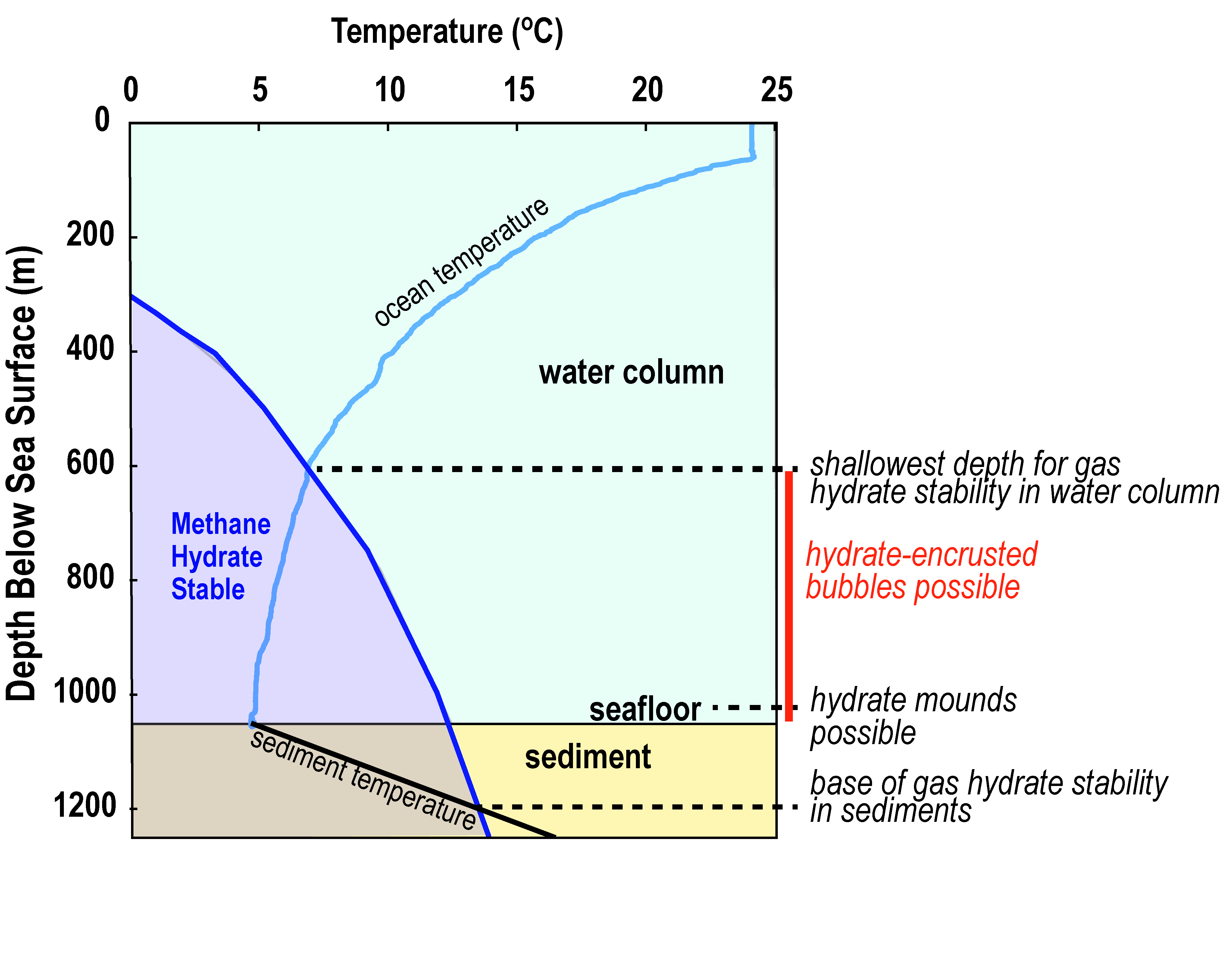
Methane hydrate is stable to the left of the purple curve on this temperature-depth plot. Each 100-meter increase in water depth corresponds to a pressure increase of ~10 megapascals.

During dive 17 the ROV Deep Discoverer encountered large gas hydrate mounds and active gas seeps on the sea floor on the northwestern edge of a salt-cored Horn Dome, 87 kilometers from the mouth of the Mississippi River in Louisiana. The low relief seafloor mounds discovered mantled gas hydrate deposits interspersed with carbonates. Gas hydrate forms when low molecular weight gas (usually methane) combines with water and freezes to form "methane ice" under low temperature and moderate pressure conditions. In the deepwater Gulf of Mexico, the ample supply of gas, coupled with appropriate pressure and temperature conditions, cause gas hydrate to form on or just beneath the seafloor. The blue curve on the graph shows the ocean temperatures measured by the conductivity-temperature-depth (CTD) sensor on the Deep Discoverer ROV during Dive 17 at Horn Dome. The sediment temperatures are estimated based on a study that examined nearby well data. Gas hydrate is stable at the seafloor, in the shallow sediments, and from the seafloor to ~600 meters depth in the water column. Such conditions are typical for the deep ocean, but the Gulf of Mexico leaks such large volumes of gas that near-seafloor gas hydrate is more common there than in most locations.

Scientists observed dense orange-stained gas hydrate exposed in several mounds. In some places, the same outcrop had both massive gas hydrate that had probably formed below the seafloor and clear, porous gas hydrate made up of hydrate-encased bubbles. Video recording of methane emissions adjacent to one of the massive hydrate deposits provided insights into seafloor gas dynamics. For example, rapid gas emissions produced bubbles, with some bubbles emerging from clear tubes formed from gas hydrate. Slow gas emissions led to the formation of hydrate-coated gas droplets that initially blocked the gas conduit until the pressure inside the droplet increased, causing the droplet to detach. Similar phenomena were filmed on bare seafloor in the Gulf of Mexico during a 2014 Okeanos Explorer expedition.

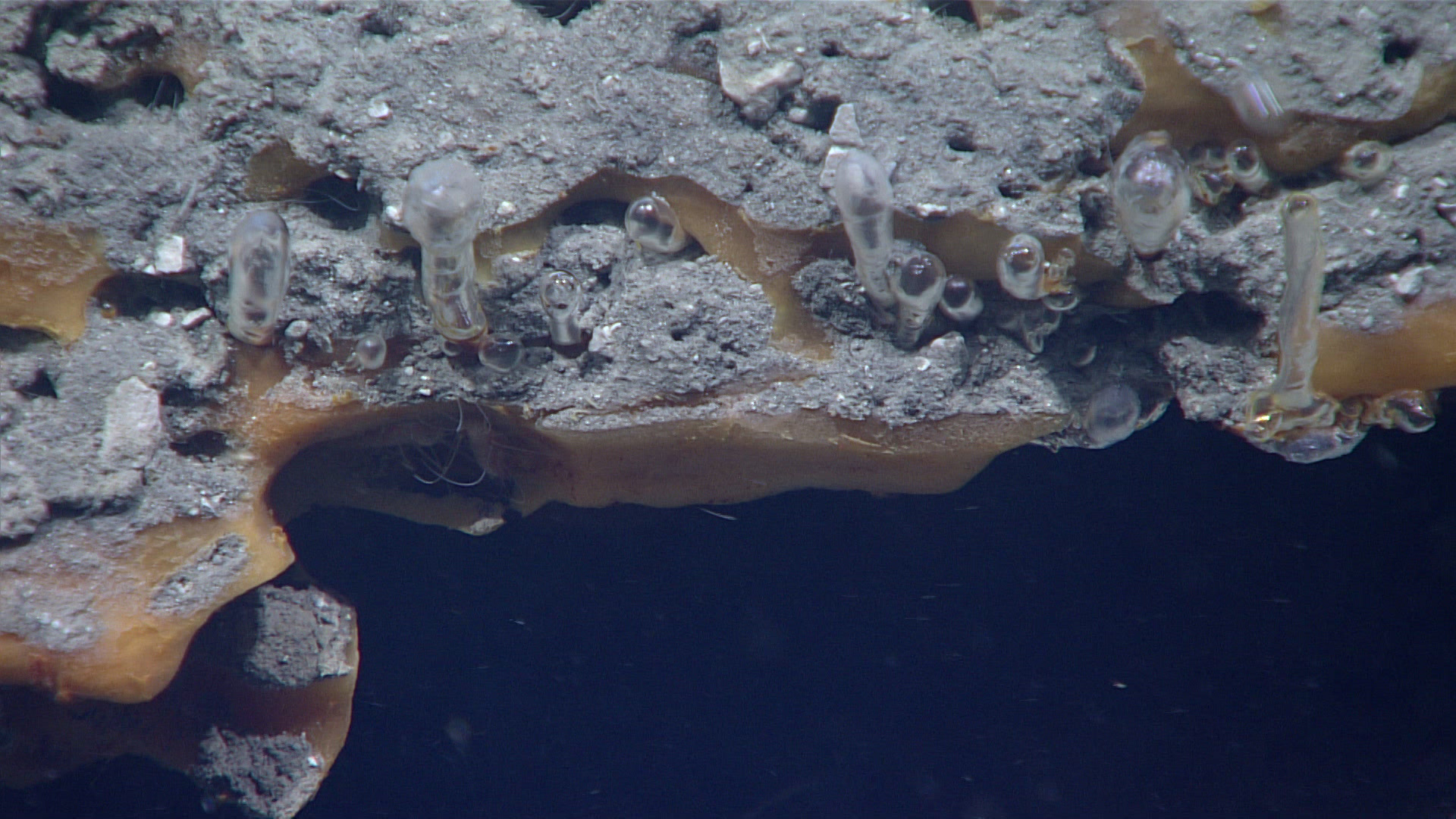
Pink "ice worms" are visible beneath the overhang in the center left part of this photo.

The only macrofauna spotted living directly on methane hydrate outcrops were ice worms, Hesiocaeca methanicola. The ice worms had burrowed into the hydrate, creating small depressions. The worms graze on bacteria growing on the hydrate. Ice worms were also seen in some of the burrows in the surrounding gas hydrate, which appears orange due to impurities. In the image to the right active methane emissions occur from beneath the ledge, through conduits at the base of the inverted droplets attached to the sediment and through a bubble tube at the right of the image. Both the bubble tubes and the inverted droplets are encased in clear gas hydrate.

== Outreach ==
The live video feeds of the expedition were shared publicly worldwide with the live video receiving more than 280,000 views via the NOAA Office of Ocean Exploration and Research (OER) YouTube channel. The expedition also conducted six live telepresence interactions with various groups including the Aquarium of the Pacific, Shedd Aquarium, NOAA Gulf Regional Council, University of New Hampshire's Center for Coastal and Ocean Mapping, The Exploratorium, and members of the MIT Media Lab.

== See also ==
NOAAS Okeanos Explorer

NOAAS Okeanos Explorer Gulf of Mexico 2018 Expedition
