= Psamathini =

Scientific classification
- Kingdom: Animalia
- Phylum: Annelida
- Clade: Pleistoannelida
- Subclass: Errantia
- Order: Phyllodocida
- Family: Hesionidae
- Subfamily: Hesioninae
- Tribe: Psamathini; Pleijel, 1998

Genera
- 5-8, see text

Family of annelids

Psamathini are a tribe of phyllodocid "bristle worms" (class Polychaeta) in the family Hesionidae. They are (like almost all polychaetes) marine organisms; most are found on the continental shelf, but some have adapted to greater depths down to the abyssal plain.

Their dorsal cirri alternate, and they usually lack facial tubercles. Most have prolonged teeth on the chaetal blades. 5 genera are placed in the Psamathini with certainty, and three further ones are often included here too in recent times, to make this tribe refer to a distinct clade of polychaetes:

- Bonuania Pillai, 1965 (tentatively placed here)
- Hesiospina Imajima & Hartman, 1964
- Micropodarke Okuda, 1938 (tentatively placed here)
- Nereimyra Blainville, 1828 (= Halimede Rathke 1843 (non de Haan, [1835]: preoccupied), Psammate)
- Psamathe Johnston, 1840 (= Kefersteinia)
- Sirsoe Pleijel, 1998 (tentatively placed here)
- Syllidia Quatrefages, 1866
- Vrijenhoekia Pleijel, Rouse, Ruta, Wiklund & Nygren, 2008
