= NOAAS Okeanos Explorer Gulf of Mexico 2018 Expedition =

Oceanographic expedition

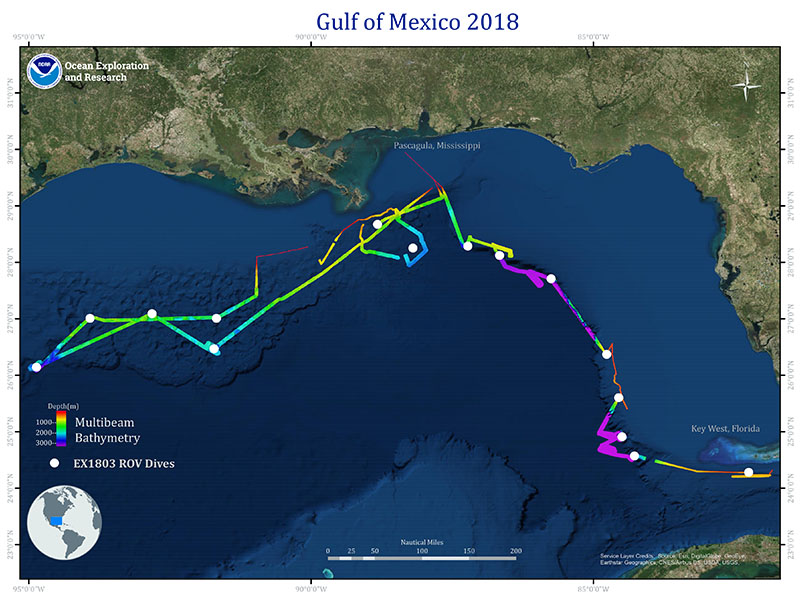
Overview map showing seafloor bathymetry and ROV dives completed during the Gulf of Mexico 2018 expedition.

This expedition was the final of three expeditions on the NOAAS Okeanos Explorer intended to increase the understanding of the deep-sea environment in the Gulf of Mexico. Gulf of Mexico 2018 was a 23-day telepresence-enabled expedition to collect critical information and acquire data on priority exploration areas identified by the ocean management and scientific communities. The goal of the expedition was to use remotely operated vehicle (ROV) dives in combination with seafloor mapping operations to increase the understanding of deep-sea ecosystems and collect scientific information to support future management decisions. The expedition lasted from 11 April 2018 to 3 May 2018.

== ROV Dives ==
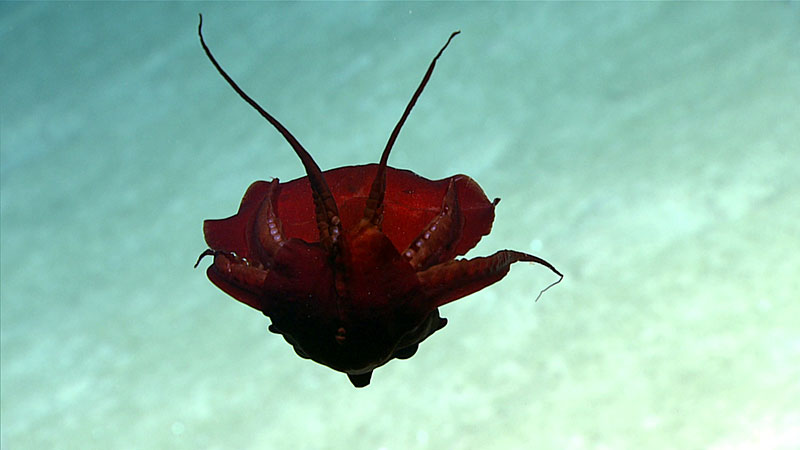
When this currently unidentified squid (possibly Discoteuthis sp.) was observed, it appeared to be curled in upon itself with its arms folded in what may be a defensive posture. What appears to be the beak is visible towards the lower part of the center of the animal and is slightly lighter in color than the body.

15 ROV dives were conducted ranging in depth from 305 to 3,010 meters to explore the diversity and distribution of deep-sea habitats and associated marine communities in the Gulf of Mexico basin. Operations were focused on characterizing deep-sea coral and sponge communities, bottomfish habitats, submarine canyons, shipwrecks, and chemosynthetic habitats such as brine pools, gas seeps, and mud volcanoes. Midwater exploration at depths ranging from 900 to 300 meters were also conducted during two dives to investigate the diversity and abundance of the largely unknown pelagic fauna.

During these dives hundreds of different species of animals, including several potential new species, new behaviors, and numerous significant range extensions were observed. 67 Biological samples (22 primary and 45 associated and commensal taxa) were collected. 13 of the biological samples represented substantial range extensions, and several were new species to science. 12 rock samples were collected for geochemical composition analysis and age-dating.

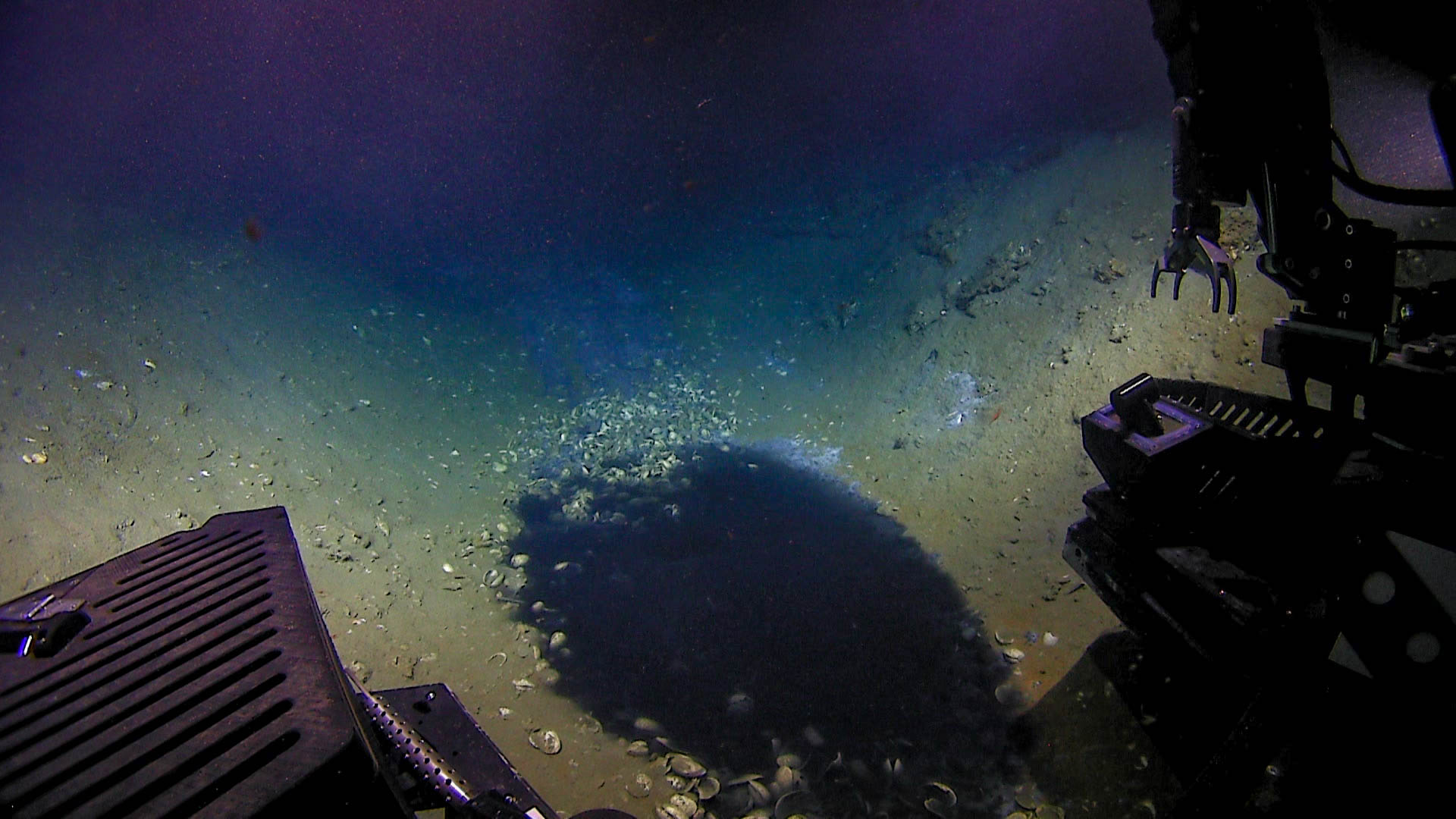
ROV Deep Discoverer observed a small (1.2 meter diameter) brine pool at 1,067 meters depth.

During dives 6 and 7 two new chemosynthetic communities were documented including a brine pool and extinct brine waterfall at Hidalgo Basin and gas seeps at Walker Ridge 488.

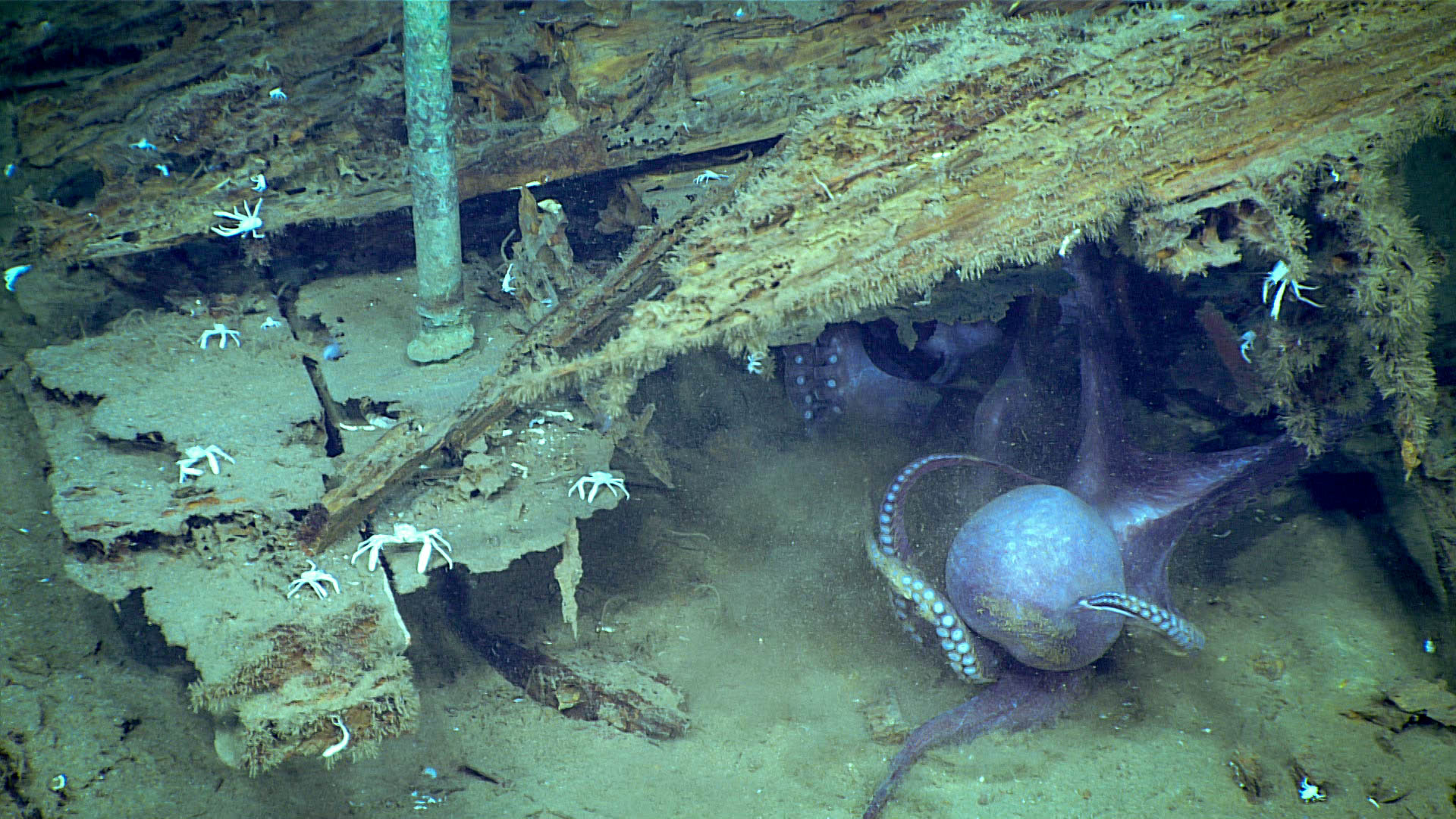
Two Muusoctopus sp. appear to wrestle for space inside the wreck seen on Dive 02 of the expedition.

During the first dive the shipwreck of the tug boat New Hope was explored for the first time and a 3D model of the site was created. The following dive explored an unidentified wooden vessel, a 3D model of the site was created as well.

A smaller objective of the dives was to document the extent of deep sea debris in the area. Trash was found 1,600 meters deep and over 275 kilometers off shore.

== Outreach ==
The live video feeds of the expedition were shared publicly worldwide with the live video receiving more than 300,700 views via the NOAA Office of Ocean Exploration and Research (OER) YouTube channel. 85 Scientist, managers, and students from 35 institutions in the United States, Japan, Russia, Norway, United Kingdom, and Canada participated as members of the science team through telepresence. The expedition also conducted 16 live telepresence interactions with various groups engaging more than 400 individuals including the Exploratorium, National Aquarium, Boston College, Hawaii Pacific University, London Natural History Museum, and many more.

== See also ==
- NOAAS Okeanos Explorer Gulf of Mexico 2017 Expedition
