= Leocratides kimuraorum =

Scientific classification
- Kingdom: Animalia
- Phylum: Annelida
- Clade: Pleistoannelida
- Subclass: Errantia
- Order: Phyllodocida
- Family: Hesionidae
- Genus: Leocratides
- Species: L. kimuraorum

Binomial name
- Leocratides kimuraorum Jimi, Tanaka & Kajihara, 2017

Polychaete species known for loud clicking sounds

Leocratides kimuraorum (Japanese: Kimura-hanakago-otohime-gokai) is a species of marine worm belonging to Hesionidae, which is known for the intensity of its intraspecific fighting. Its body is nearly translucent and up to 29 millimetres (1.1 in) long.

This bristle worm species lives off the coast of Japan, inside sponges 85–169 metres (279–554 ft) deep.

L. kimuraorum produces one of the loudest sounds in the ocean, a popping sound, at 157 dB (at a reference pressure of 1 μPa) at 1 m, with frequencies in the 1–100 kHz range, similar to the snapping shrimps.

== Discovery ==
The worm was first discovered in 2017. The holotype specimen was found at a depth of 104 metres (341 ft), south of Honshu, off the coast of Shima, Mie The holotype was 29 millimetres (1.1 in) long and 5 millimetres (0.20 in) wide. Discovered in Sagami Bay, the Japanese name of the worm is Kimura-hanakago-otohime-gokai.

=== Taxonomy ===
Other members of the genus Leocratides — worms inhabiting Aphrocallistes sponges — include L. ehlersi and L. filamentosus.

Leocratides kimuraorum can be distinguished by the length of its antennae, which are as long as palps.

== Description ==
The worm has 21 segments and 16 of them bear chaetae (the bristled setae of polychaetes). The face is somewhat flattened. The body is cylindrical, but tapers slightly toward the posterior end. In life, the worm is transparent, with ring-shaped integument (scaly ridges) along the back, and discontinuous brown stripe markings. Like other members of its genus, Leocratides kimuraorum inhabits hexactinellid sponges.

== Behavior ==
In a behavior that researchers called "mouth-fighting," the worms approach each other headfirst with their mouths open. During these encounters, the pharynx muscles expand rapidly, forming a cavitation bubble that then collapses and produces a loud "pop" while the worms launch into each other. They may use this mouth-fighting to defend territory or living chambers from other worms. The production of this sound implies unique and extreme biomechanics for a soft-bodied organism. The sound produced is 157 decibels and at ultra high frequencies.
