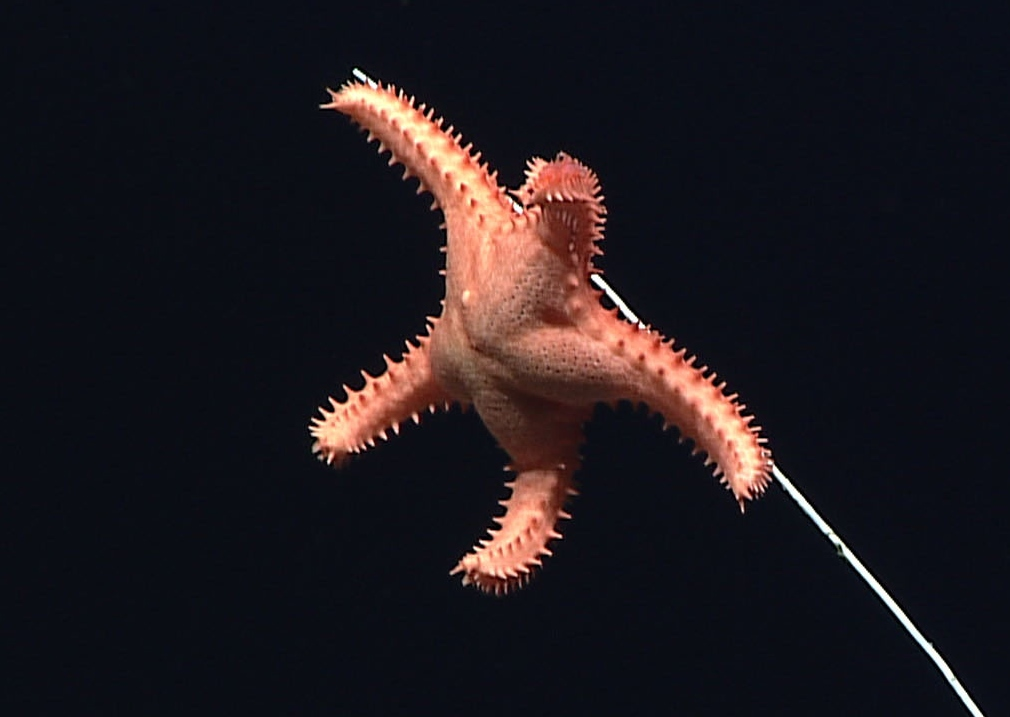
- Atheraster symphonia

Scientific classification
- Kingdom: Animalia
- Phylum: Echinodermata
- Class: Asteroidea
- Order: Valvatida
- Family: Goniasteridae
- Subfamily: Circeasterinae
- Genus: Atheraster; Mah, 2022

Type species
- Atheraster symphonia Mah, 2022

= Atheraster =

Genus of sea stars

Atheraster is a genus of deep-sea sea stars in the family Goniasteridae.

== Taxonomy and systematics ==
The genus was one of four new genera of sea stars described from specimens collected by the NOAS ship Okeanos Explorer during the CAPSTONE expedition to the North Pacific Ocean between 2015 and 2018. This expedition collected video and specimen data from the Hawaiian Islands region and other American territories in the Central and South Pacific Ocean, resulting in the description of 20 sea star species from 14 genera in 3 families.

== Distribution and habitat ==
Species of Atheraster are known from the deep-sea environments of the Pacific and Indian Oceans.

== Species ==
The genus contains five species:

- Atheraster arandae (Mah, 2006)
- Atheraster luma Mah, 2024
- Atheraster pheos Mah, 2024
- Atheraster symphonia Mah, 2022
- Atheraster umbo Mah, 2026
