= United States Arctic Research Commission =

Federal agency for Arctic research policy

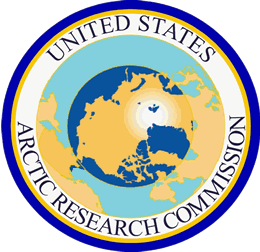

Agency overview
- Formed: 1984
- Jurisdiction: United States Government
- Annual budget: $1.77 million USD(2024)
- Agency executives: Chair; Larry Mayer
- Website: https://www.arctic.gov/

The United States Arctic Research Commission (USARC) is a United States federal agency. It was established by the Arctic Research and Policy Act of 1984 (as amended, Public Law 101–609).

USARC operated on a budget of $1.77 million in fiscal year 2024.

== Duties ==
The commission's principal duties are:

1. to establish the national policy, priorities, and goals necessary to construct a federal program plan for basic and applied scientific research with respect to the Arctic, including natural resources and materials, physical, biological and health sciences, and social and behavioral sciences;
2. to promote Arctic research, to recommend Arctic research policy, and to communicate our research and policy recommendations to the President and the Congress;
3. to work with the National Science Foundation as the lead agency responsible for implementing the Arctic research policy and to support cooperation and collaboration throughout the Federal Government;
4. to give guidance to the Interagency Arctic Research Policy Committee (IARPC) to develop national Arctic research projects and a five-year plan to implement those projects; and
5. to interact with Arctic residents, international Arctic research programs and organizations and local institutions including regional governments in order to obtain the broadest possible view of Arctic research needs.

The Arctic Research and Policy Act was amended in 1990 to increase the number of Commissioners appointed by the President of the United States from five to seven voting members. Four members are from academic or research institutions; two members from private industry undertaking commercial activities in the Arctic; and one member from among the indigenous residents of the US Arctic. The Director of the National Science Foundation serves as an ex officio member.

== Current Members ==
The current members of the commission are as follows:

- Thomas Emanuel Dans (Chair)
- Larry Mayer (former Chair)
- Gov. Mike Dunleavy
- David Michael Kennedy
- Mark Myers
- Jackie A. Richter-Menge
- Deborah Vo
- NSF Director -TDB (ex officio)

== Former Members ==
- Nikoosh Carlo
- Elizabeth Ann Cravalho

== Staff ==
The Commission staff consists of an executive director in Arlington County, Virginia, a Senior Staff Officer in Anchorage, Alaska, and an Administrative Officer in the Arlington office. The principal office of the commission is in Arlington and the Alaska office of the commission is located in Anchorage. Advisors are appointed by the commission on an "as needed" basis to provide information and advice on particular research needs and issues of concern to the commission, review draft documents of the commission and convey information of importance on the various scientific and engineering disciplines they represent.

== See also ==
- Arctic policy of the United States
