= Periboea (disambiguation) =

Periboea is the name of several figures in Greek mythology.

Periboea may also refer to:

- Periboea (annelid), genus of polychaete worms in the family Hesionidae
- Periboea (plant), genus of flowering plants in the family Hyacinthaceae
- Periboea, a genus of true bugs in the family Pentatomidae; synonym of Diaphyta
