= Leocratides =

Scientific classification
- Kingdom: Animalia
- Phylum: Annelida
- Clade: Pleistoannelida
- Subclass: Errantia
- Order: Phyllodocida
- Family: Hesionidae
- Subfamily: Hesioninae
- Genus: Leocratides; Ehlers, 1908

Species
- L. kimuraorum L. ehlersi L. filamentosus

Synonyms
- Leocrates (superseded)

Genus of marine hesionid polychaete worms

Leocratides is a genus of marine hesionid polychaete worms dwelling in hexactinellid sponges.

== Names and taxonomy ==
A superseded synonym of the genus is Leocrates. Its parent group is Hesionini, a tribe in the subfamily Hesioninae.

The three known species include L. kimuraorum, L. ehlersi, and L. filamentosus.

The Japanese name of Leocratides is hanakago-otohime-gokai-zoku.

== History of research ==
The taxonomy of the genus has been debated by invertebrate zoologists since L. filamentosus was first discovered by the German zoologist Ernst Ehlers in 1908 on the deep-sea Valdivia Expedition. When R. Horst described L. ehlersi for the first time in 1921, examining an old specimen from the Siboga expedition, he suggested that the two known species were distinguished by having one or two dorsal jaw plates. Based on a 1926 analysis however, H. Augener argued that L. ehlersi was a junior synonym of L. filamentosus, and that both had two upper jaw plates. In 1970, Marian Pettibone once again re-described both species in detail and concluded they were synonymous. Yet, in 1998, Fredrik Pleijel restored L. ehlersi as a distinct species again. The distinguishing features between L. filamentosus and L. ehlersi are that the former has pharyngeal terminal papillae and a papillose peristomial membrane, while the latter lacks them. Pleijel's interpretation in 1998 has held up to the present, being reconfirmed in 2017.

In 2017, a new species, L. kimuraorum was described by Naoto Jimi, Masaatsu Tanaka, and Hiroshi Kajihara, who also extended the range of L. filamentosus to Sagami Bay. In 2019, L. kimuraorum was discovered to produce a uniquely loud clicking sound during conspecific 'mouth-fights'. Media sources named it a "mouth fighting worm" or "tiny fighting worm". L. kimuraorum is distinguished by remarkably long antennae as long as palps, by the presence of pharyngeal terminal papillae in common with L. filamentosus, and by the absence of a papillose peristomial membrane in common with L. ehlersi.

== Behavior ==
Worms of the genus Leocratides are marine organisms like almost all polychaetes (bristle worms). Body size is generally 21–50 millimetres (0.83–1.97 in). As larvae, they are zooplankton. They become benthos as adults.

The worms inhabit Aphrocallistes sp. hexactinellid sponges. Their ecology with their sponge hosts is not entirely known, but they probably feed on the sponges. Mouth-fighting in one species may serve as territorial competition over the sponge.

They live at depths from 74–677 meters (243–2,221 ft). They were initially discovered in the sublittoral zone, above the dropoff of the continental shelf, but more recently have been discovered at greater depths.

== Distribution ==
Species of Leocratides inhabit the Indian and Pacific Oceans. They are known from the Red Sea (L. ehlersi), and off the coasts of Indonesia (L. filamentosus) and Japan (L. filamentosus and L. kimuraorum).
