= Orseis (annelid) =

Scientific classification
- Kingdom: Animalia
- Phylum: Annelida
- Clade: Pleistoannelida
- Subclass: Errantia
- Order: Phyllodocida
- Family: Hesionidae
- Genus: Orseis; Ehlers, 1864

Genus of annelid worms

Orseis is a genus of annelids belonging to the family Hesionidae.

The species of this genus are found in America.

Species:

- Orseis brevis Hartmann-Schröder, 1959
- Orseis fimbriata Hartman, 1953
