= Edge effects =

Ecological concept

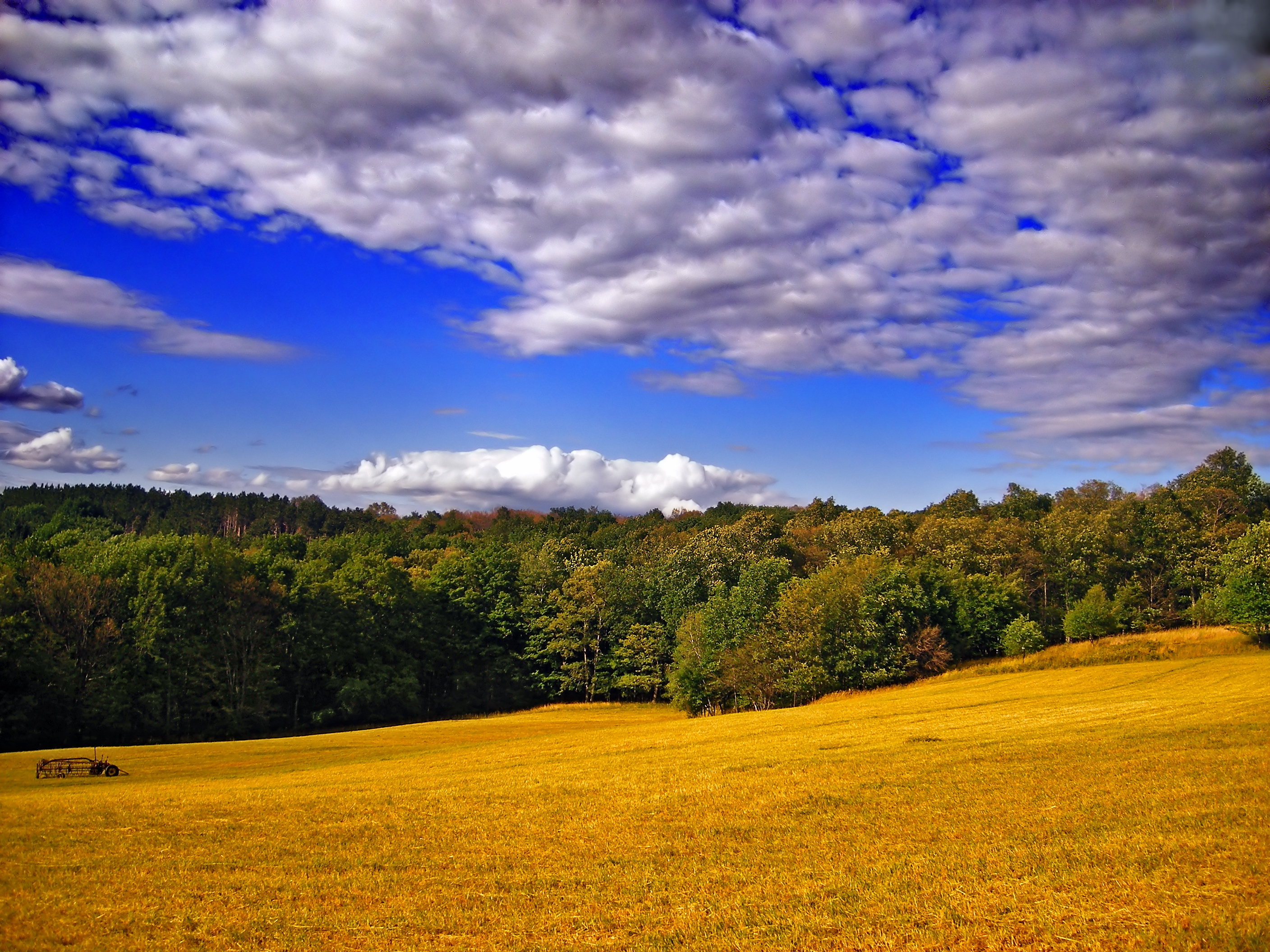
Edges arise where two or more habitat types come into contact as here in Pennsylvania, United States.

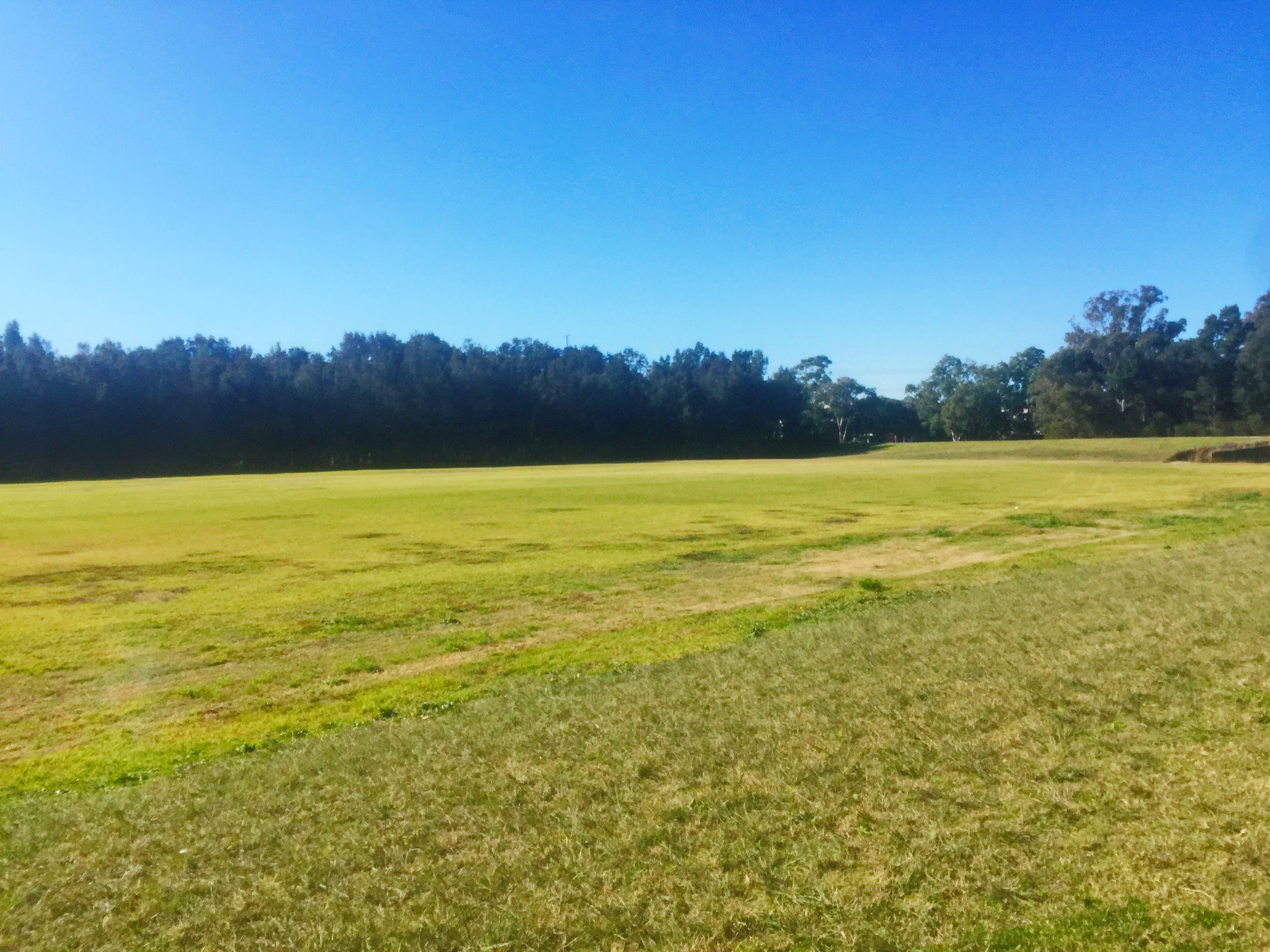
An edge between an open parkland and a coastal swamp oak forest in Sydney, Australia.

== Definition ==
In ecology, edge effects are changes in population or community structures that occur at the boundary of two or more habitats. These effects transpire since environmental conditions near habitat boundaries differ from those in the interior areas. Habitat boundaries experience conditions like increased wind exposure, light, and temperature fluctuations. Areas with small habitat fragments exhibit especially pronounced edge effects that may extend throughout the range. As the edge effects increase, the boundary habitat can support higher levels of biodiversity than adjacent ecosystems with increased habitat fragmentation because they serve as transitional zones for overlapping environmental conditions. In this way species from each of these two separate ecosystems are able to co-exist in the same general area along with species which have developed adaptations specific to the edge environment.

== Biodiversity ==
Environmental conditions enable certain species of plants and animals to colonize habitat borders. Plants that colonize forest edges tend to be shade-intolerant. These plants also tend to be tolerant of dry conditions, such as shrubs and vines. Animals that colonize tend to be those that require two or more habitats, such as white-tailed and mule deer, elk, cottontail rabbits, blue jays, and robins. Some animals travel between habitats, while edge species (generalists) are restricted to edges. Larger patches have increased native species biodiversity compared to smaller patches. The width of the patch also influences diversity: an edge patch must be more pronounced than just a stark border in order to develop gradients of edge effects.

Animals traveling between communities can create travel lanes along borders, which in turn increases light reaching plants along the lanes and promotes primary production. As more light reaches the plants, greater numbers and sizes can thrive. Increased primary production can increase numbers of herbivorous insects, followed by nesting birds and so on up the trophic levels.

In the case of wide and/or overgrown borders, some species can become restricted to one side of the border despite having the ability to inhabit the other. Sometimes, the edge effects result in abiotic and biotic conditions which diminish natural variation and threaten the original ecosystem. Abiotic effects refer to changes in non-living environmental conditions at edges while biotic effects refer to changes in living organisms along with their interactions. An example of abiotic edge effects is increased temperature and wind, while an example of biotic edge effects is increased predation and competition. Detrimental edge effects are also seen in physical and chemical conditions of border species. For instance, fertilizer from an agricultural field could invade a bordering forest and contaminate the habitat. The three factors affecting edges can be summarized:

- Abiotic effect—Changes in the environmental conditions that result from the proximity to a structurally dissimilar matrix
- Direct biological effects—Changes in species abundance and distribution caused directly by physical conditions near the edge
- Indirect biological effects which involve changes in species interactions such as predation, brood parasitism, competition, herbivory, and biotic pollination and seed dispersal

Edge effects will have an effect on the ways that animals behave and how ecosystems are stable over time. The edge environment could be suitable for some species, but other species could suffer from increased predation risk and competition. This leads to a shift in species composition, with the most competitive species (generalists) becoming more common than those that require a specific niche (specialists). Additionally, edge habitats are affected by increased environmental variability which will add additional pressures to the biodiversity of the area. Urbanization and agriculture practices increase the amount of habitat edges created through fragmentation. Therefore, areas with many edges may lose diversity and have their ecological processes disrupted. Thus, understanding the mechanisms behind this is important for developing conservation strategy to help limit the negative aspects of edge effects and preserve natural habitats.

== Types ==
Edge effect variability is influenced by many factors including environmental conditions, human activities, and the composition of ecosystems. The extent to which edge effects affect species interactions and resource distribution varies as a result. Ecologists have thus defined various types of edge effects to describe differing features of habitat edges or transition zones.

- Inherent – Natural features stabilize the border location.
- Induced – Transient natural disturbances (e.g., fire or flood) or human related activities, subject borders to successional changes over time.
- Narrow – One habitat abruptly ends and another begins (e.g., an agricultural field.)
- Wide (ecotone) – A large distance separates the borders of two clearly and purely definable habitats based upon their physical conditions and vegetation, and in between there exists a large transition region.
- Convoluted – The border is irregular, or non-linear in shape.
- Perforated – The border has gaps that host other habitats.

Height can create borders between patches as well.

== Urbanization ==
Urbanization is causing humans to continuously fragment landscapes, thus intensifying edge effects. These changes in landscape ecology are proving to have significant ecological consequences. Generalist species, especially invasive ones, have been seen to benefit from this landscape change whilst specialist species are suffering. For example, the alpha diversity of edge-intolerant birds in Lacandona rainforest, Mexico, is decreasing as edge effects increase.

== Effects on succession ==
Edge effects also apply to succession, influencing how vegetation spreads over time. Different species are suited either to the edges or to central sections of the habitat, resulting in a varied distribution. Edges also vary with orientation: edges on the north or south receive less or more sun than the opposite side (depending on hemisphere and convex or concave relief). Other factors such as light intensity, soil composition and duration of growing periods can affect the composition and structure of vegetation leading to area with larger edge effect.

== Human effects ==
Human activity such as road construction, logging, and urban development create edges by fragmenting habitats. Often, the changes are detrimental to both the size of the habitat and to species. Examples of human impacts include:

- Introduction of invasives/exotics
- Agriculture
- Higher severity and frequency of fires
- Companion animals (pets) acting as predators and competitors
- Trails
- Pollution, erosion
- Loss of foraging habitats
- Habitat fragmentation
- Deforestation and land use

== Examples ==
When edges divide any natural ecosystem and the area outside the boundary is a disturbed or unnatural system, the natural ecosystem can be seriously affected for some distance in from the edge. In 1971, Odum wrote, 'The tendency for increased variety and diversity at community junctions is known as the edge effect... It is common knowledge that the density of songbirds is greater on estates, campuses and similar settings...as compared with tracts of uniform forest'. In a forest where the adjacent land has been cut, creating an open/forest boundary, sunlight and wind penetrate to a much greater extent, drying out the interior of the forest close to the edge and encouraging growth of opportunistic species there. Air temperature, vapor pressure deficit, soil moisture, light intensity and levels of photosynthetically active radiation (PAR) all change at edges.

=== Amazon rainforest ===
One study estimated that the amount of Amazon Basin area modified by edge effects exceeded the area that had been cleared. "In studies of Amazon forest fragments, micro-climate effects were evident up to 100m (330ft.) into the forest interior." The smaller the fragment, the more susceptible it is to fires spreading from nearby cultivated fields. Forest fires are more common close to edges due to increased light availability that leads to increased desiccation and increased understory growth. Increased understory biomass provides fuel that allows pasture fires to spread into the forests. Increased fire frequency since the 1990s is among the edge effects that are slowly transforming Amazonian forests. The changes in temperature, humidity and light levels promote invasion of non-forest species, including invasive species. The overall effect of these fragment processes is that all forest fragments tend to lose native biodiversity depending on fragment size and shape, isolation from other forest areas, and the forest matrix.

=== North America ===
The amount of forest edge is orders of magnitude greater now in the United States than when the Europeans first began settling North America. Some species have benefited from this fact, for example, the brown-headed cowbird, which is a brood parasite that lays its eggs in the nests of songbirds nesting in forest near the forest boundary. Another example of a species benefiting from the proliferation of forest edge is poison ivy.

Conversely, Dragonflies eat mosquitoes, but have more trouble than mosquitoes surviving around the edges of human habitation. Thus, trails and hiking areas near human settlements often have more mosquitoes than do deep forest habitats. Grasses, huckleberries, flowering currants and shade-intolerant trees such as the Douglas-fir all thrive in edge habitats.

In the case of developed lands juxtaposed to wild lands, problems with invasive exotics often result. Species such as kudzu, Japanese honeysuckle and multiflora rose have damaged natural ecosystems. Beneficially, the open spots and edges provide places for species that thrive where there is lighter and vegetation that is close to the ground. Deer and elk benefit particularly as their principal diet is that of grass and shrubs which are found only on the edges of forested areas.

== Alternative definitions of edge effect ==
The phenomenon of increased variety of plants as well as animals at the community junction (ecotone) is also called the edge effect and is essentially due to a locally broader range of suitable environmental conditions or ecological niches.

Edge effects in biological assays refer to artifacts in data that are caused by the position of the wells on a screening plate rather than a biological effect

The edge effect in scanning electron microscopy is the phenomenon in which the number of secondary and/or backscattered electrons that escape the sample and reach the detector is higher at an edge than at a surface. The interaction volume spreads far below the surface, but secondary electrons can only escape when close to the surface (generally about 10 nm, although this depends on the material). However, when the electron beam impacts an area close to the edge, electrons that are generated below an impact point that is close to an edge but that is far below the surface may be able to escape through the vertical surface instead.

== See also ==
- Ecotone
- Habitat fragmentation
- Landscape ecology
- Ruderal species
- Spatial ecology
- Woodland edge
- Deforestation
