= NOAAS Okeanos Explorer =

Exploratory vessel for the National Oceanic and Atmospheric Administration

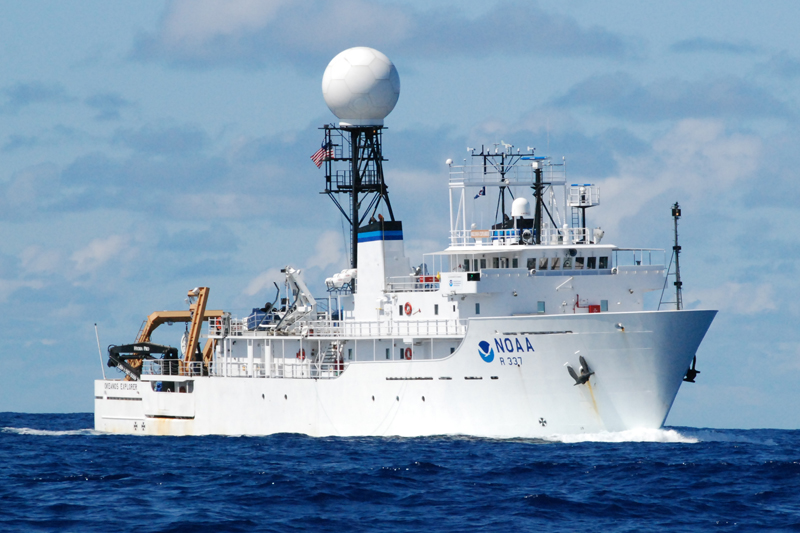
- Okeanos Explorer at sea (with satellite dome before it was shortened in 2011)

History

United States
- Name: USNS Capable (T-AGOS-16)
- Awarded: 20 February 1987
- Builder: Halter Marine
- Laid down: 17 October 1987
- Launched: 28 October 1988
- In service: 9 June 1989
- Out of service: 14 September 2004
- Fate: Transferred to NOAA

United States
- Name: Okeanos Explorer
- Commissioned: 13 August 2008
- In service: 2010 - present
- Home port: Newport, Rhode Island
- Identification: IMO number: 8835114; MMSI number: 369888000; Call sign: WTDH

General characteristics
- Class & type: Stalwart-class ocean Surveillance Ship
- Displacement: 1565 tons (lightship); 2265 tons (full load)
- Length: 224 ft (68 m)
- Beam: 43 ft (13 m)
- Draft: 17 ft (5.2 m)
- Propulsion: 4 × Caterpillar D398 diesels, 3,200 hp; GE motors, 2 × 800 hp; 2 × 250 hp stern thrusters; 1 × 500 hp bow thruster
- Speed: 10 knots (19 km/h)
- Range: 9,600 nautical miles (18,000 km)
- Endurance: 40 days
- Complement: 7 commissioned officers, 3 licensed engineers, 17 crew, 22 scientists

NOAAS Okeanos Explorer (R 337) is a converted United States Navy ship (formerly USNS Capable (T-AGOS-16)), now an exploratory vessel for the National Oceanic and Atmospheric Administration (NOAA), officially launched in 2010. Starting in 2010, NOAA entered into a five-year partnership with the San Francisco Exploratorium. The focus is on gathering scientific information about oceans for the public as well as for scientific uses. The ship is equipped with cameras and will provide real-time viewing of the ocean floor for scientists and for the public.

This is a pioneering use of what NOAA calls "telepresence technology". The Okeanos Explorer is the only vessel owned by the U.S. government that is dedicated to exploring the seabed and ocean crust. The ship is named after Okeanos, the Ancient Greek god of the sea, from which also comes the word "ocean".

== Description ==
The 224-foot-long (68 m) converted vessel is covered with cameras capable of high definition images, and sophisticated devices such as 3-D sonar mapping systems. It looks like an average ship, except for a 12-foot-wide (3.7 m) white ball, its satellite dome, mounted high above its bridge.

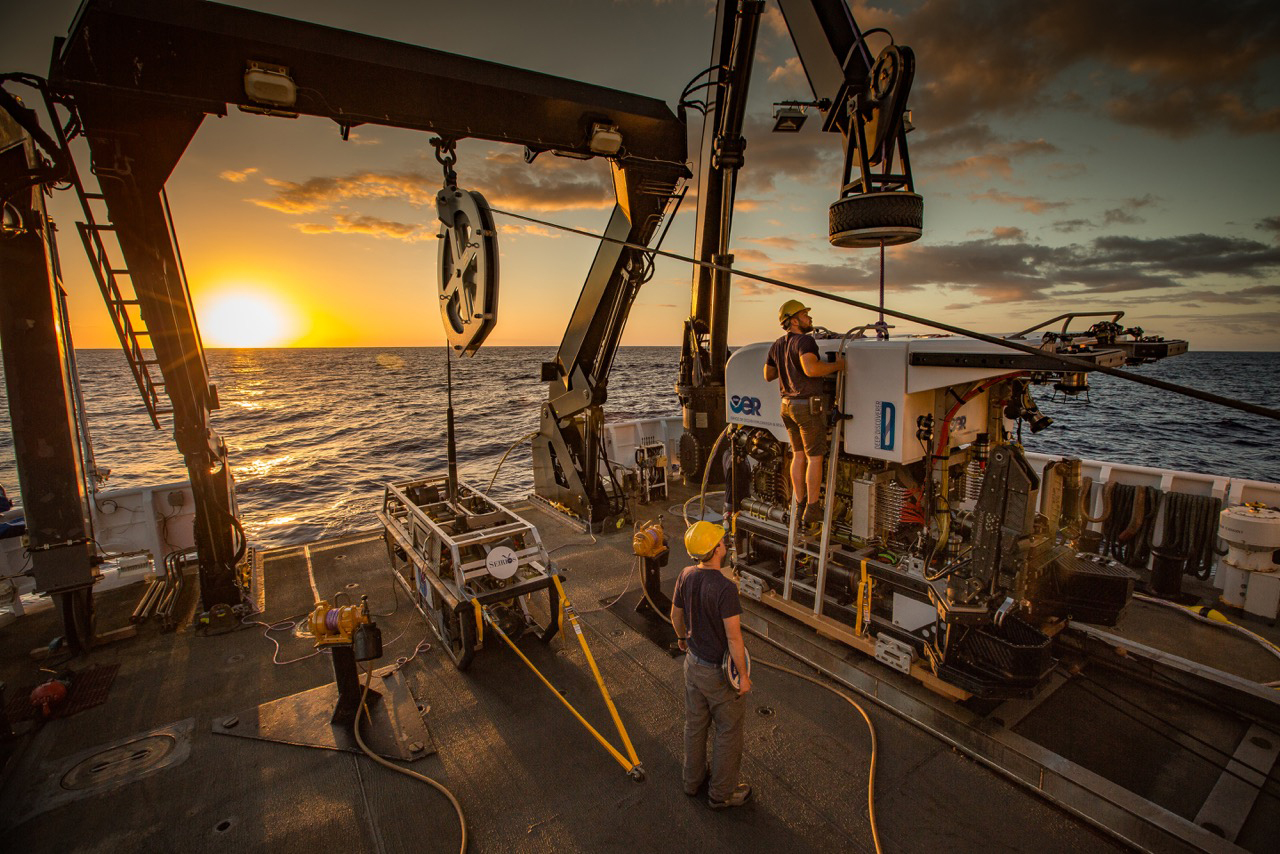
The ROV Deep Discoverer on the aft deck.

The Okeanos Explorer is the only NOAA ship to have a dedicated ROV. Although ROVs have been used on other NOAA ships, they are typically removed at the end of a cruise. Having a permanent ROV makes it easier to deploy at any time throughout the field season. On the Okeanos Explorer, there is an integrated control room for operating the multibeam, ROV and telepresence communication equipment. Having the screens and computers permanently wired to the ship makes it more efficient to sustain long-term exploration in remote areas of the world.

== Voyages ==
=== INDEX 2010 Exploration (Indonesia) ===
From June to August 2010, an international team led by scientists from the United States and Indonesia collaborated to explore the depths of Indonesian waters. The expedition, Indonesia-USA Deep-Sea Exploration of the Sangihe Talaud Region (INDEX 2010), featured a number of firsts including: the maiden voyage of the Okeanos Explorer; the first joint Indonesia-USA ocean exploration expedition; and the first joint international mission with two ships sending live video to scientists in Exploration Command Centers ashore.

=== Galápagos Rift Expedition 2011 ===
From June to July 2011, a team of scientists and technicians both at-sea and on shore conducted exploratory investigations on the diversity and distribution of deep-sea habitats and marine life in the vicinity of the Galápagos Islands. The 50-day expedition is divided into two ‘legs’ and includes work in Ecuador, Costa Rica, and international waters. Mapping and water column information collected during Leg I identified a number of exciting targets to explore with the Institute for Exploration's Little Hercules ROV during Leg II. Between July 11 and July 28, the ship explored seamounts, the oldest known vent fields, off-axis sulfide mounds, deep fracture zones, and newly discovered vents. The expedition also marks the debut of a new camera sled and lighting platform named Seirios. When deployed from the ship with the Little Hercules, provided scientists and the audiences onshore with the very first video footage from a number of deepwater areas around the Galápagos.

=== Mid-Cayman Rise Expedition 2011 ===
In August 2011, NOAA Ship Okeanos Explorer embarked on an expedition to the deepest part of the Caribbean Sea, where a team of international scientists both at-sea and on shore conducted interdisciplinary investigations of the Mid-Cayman Rise – an ultra-slow spreading center where two plates gradually move apart and upwelling magma creates new crust – and the adjacent Cayman Trough. The exploration focused on the oceanic core complexes that appear to dominate construction of the rift valley walls along much of the Mid-Cayman Rise, and the inner wall of the Cayman Trough fracture zone immediately to the north – investigating the geology, marine life, and hydrothermal systems that these areas might host. Over the course of 10 days, the ship mapped the rift valley walls of the Mid-Cayman Rise and northern wall of the Cayman Trough Fracture zone using the ship's deep-water multibeam sonar; explored the water column for hydrothermal activity using a CTD rosette, in situ sensors, and shipboard dissolved methane analysis; and conducted detailed seafloor investigations the ship's ROV. During the expedition, live video of ongoing operations were to be streamed to shore where a team of scientists from the U.S. and U.K. joined the expedition remotely through the use of telepresence technology.

=== Veatch Canyon Shakedown Cruise 2012 ===
"EX1201" was the first expedition of the 2012 field season for NOAA Ship Okeanos Explorer. The primary objective of this shakedown cruise was to operationally test the vessel, its systems, and all mission equipment. A secondary objective of the expedition was to use the ship's technologically advanced multibeam sonar to map three Northeast and Mid-Atlantic canyon areas in support of the benthic habitat identification and management efforts of NOAA's Northeast Fisheries Science Center (NEFSC). After departing its homeport of Davisville, Rhode Island, on February 14, Okeanos Explorer proceeded offshore to Veatch Canyon where a sonar patch test was conducted to ensure the proper calibration of the vessel's multibeam echosounder. As part of successful patch test operations, approximately 280 square kilometers of Veatch Canyon were bathymetrically mapped, including the majority of the first priority area identified by NEFSC. Later in the cruise, focused survey operations conducted at Block, Ryan, and McMaster Canyons mapped approximately 900 square kilometers of seafloor, including 65 percent of the second NEFSC priority area. Focused mapping operations at Hendrickson, Toms, and Berkeley Canyons covered approximately 1,400 square kilometers of seafloor. Finally, focused mapping operations at Hendrickson, Toms, and Berkeley Canyons covered approximately 1400 square kilometers of seafloor, including 85 percent of the third NEFSC priority area. While transiting along the continental shelf break between focused mapping areas, multibeam, single beam, and sub-bottom sonar data was collected, adding to the seafloor mapping coverage established on Okeanos Explorer cruise EX1106. In addition to successful shakedown testing and mapping operations, EX1201 also yielded a number of positive educational outcomes. During the cruise, two graduate interns were trained in seafloor mapping operations as part of the Okeanos Explorer internship program. Additionally, approximately 50 high school students, educators, and local media toured the vessel and learned about its mission at the conclusion of the expedition, in Charleston, South Carolina.

=== Gulf of Mexico 2012 Expedition ===
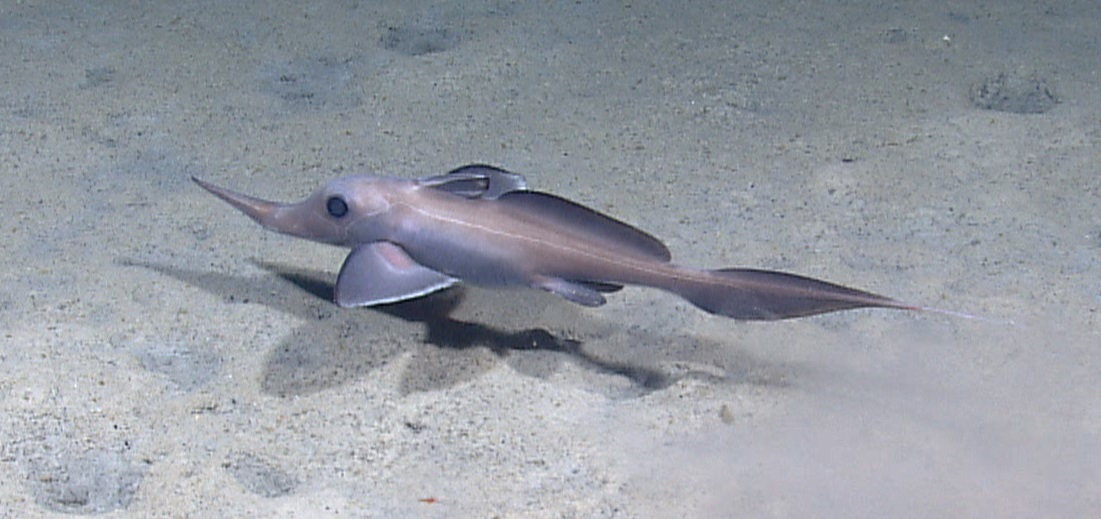
Narrownose chimaera, Gulf of Mexico, 2012

From March to April 2012, a team of scientists and technicians both at-sea and on shore conducted exploratory investigations on the diversity and distribution of deep-sea habitats and marine life in the northern Gulf of Mexico. The 56-day expedition was divided into three 'legs.' Through discussions and information stemming from the May 2011 Atlantic Basin Workshop, Fall 2011 Gulf of Mexico mapping expedition, and Leg I of the 2012 Gulf of Mexico expedition, NOAA and the broader science community identified a number of exciting targets to explore during Legs II and III. We explored cold seeps, deep coral communities, undersea canyons, and shipwrecks. The expedition also marked the return of the Institute for Exploration's Little Hercules remotely operated vehicle (ROV) and NOAA's Seirios camera sled and lighting platform to the NOAA Ship Okeanos Explorer. When these systems were deployed from the ship, we were able to provide scientists and the audiences onshore with real-time video footage from deepwater areas in important, yet largely unknown, U.S. waters.

=== Northeast U.S. Canyons Expedition 2013 ===
From July to August 2013, a team of scientists and technicians both at-sea and on shore will conduct exploratory investigations on the diversity and distribution of deep-sea habitats and marine life along the Northeast U.S. Canyons and at Mytilus Seamount, located within the U.S. Exclusive Economic Zone.

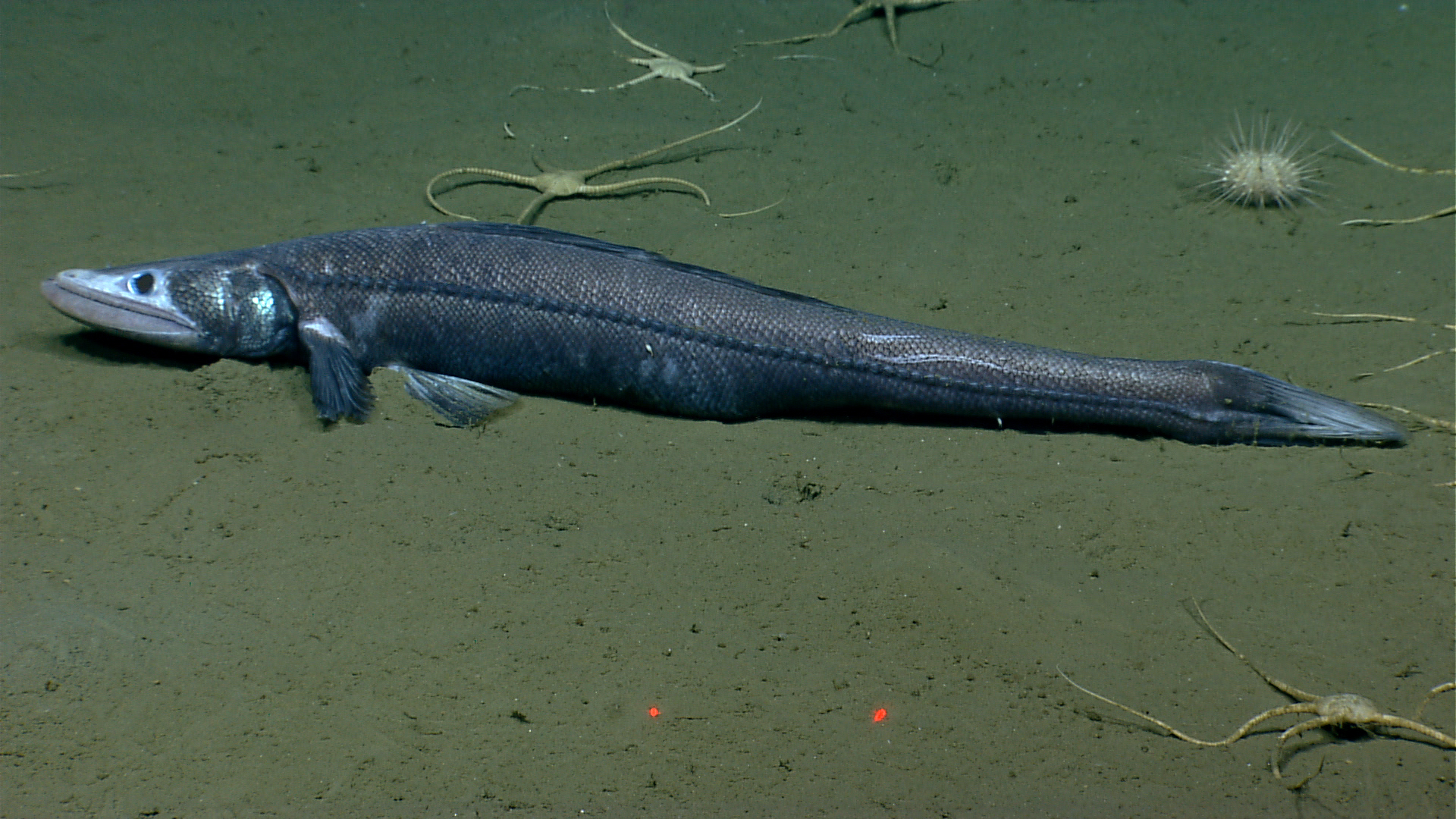
A Bathysaurus observed off the US east coast in 2013.

The 36-day expedition is composed of two cruise ‘legs.’ The exploration area for this community-driven expedition was identified based on the discussions and information stemming from the May 2011 Atlantic Basin Workshop and priority area input received from other NOAA programs and the management community. Using this input, and data acquired during previous Atlantic Canyon Undersea Mapping Expeditions (ACUMEN Project), NOAA and the broader science community have identified a number of exciting targets to explore during the two cruise legs, commencing the next steps in systematic exploration. In the coming weeks, we expect to explore cold seeps, deep coral communities, undersea canyons, landslide features, and a seamount.

The expedition also marks the first time NOAA's new 6,000 meter remotely operated vehicle (ROV), Deep Discoverer and the Seirios camera sled and lighting platform will be used to in a full telepresence-enabled ocean exploration with NOAA Ship Okeanos Explorer. When these systems are deployed from the ship, scientists and audiences onshore will be provided with real-time video footage from deepwater areas in important, yet largely unknown, U.S. waters.

=== Our Deepwater Backyard: Exploring Atlantic Canyons and Seamounts 2014 ===
From August through October 2014, NOAA Ship Okeanos Explorer will explore the largely unknown deep-sea ecosystems of the U.S. Atlantic coast. Our at-sea and shore-based science team will collect baseline data in the Atlantic submarine canyons and along the New England Seamount Chain.

=== Océano Profundo 2015: Exploring Puerto Rico's Seamounts, Trenches, and Troughs ===
Second of three exploration cruises of NOAA Ship Okeanos Explorer in the Caribbean in the 2015 field season. The primary focus of this cruise is high-resolution mapping of areas near Puerto Rico and the Puerto Rico Trench.

=== 2016 Hohonu Moana: Exploring Deep Waters off Hawaiʻi ===
From February 25 to March 18, scientists will continue 2015 Hohonu Moana expedition efforts to explore deep-water habitats in and around Papahānaumokuākea Marine National Monument. The expedition will include work on seamounts in the Mid-Pacific Mountains while en route to port in Kwajalein.

=== 2017 American Samoa Expedition: Suesuega o le Moana o Amerika Samoa ===
From February to April 2017, NOAA and partners will conducted two telepresence-enabled ocean exploration cruises on NOAA Ship Okeanos Explorer to collect critical baseline information of unknown and poorly known deepwater areas in American Samoa and Samoa, with an emphasis on Rose Atoll Marine National Monument, National Marine Sanctuary of American Samoa, and National Park of American Samoa.

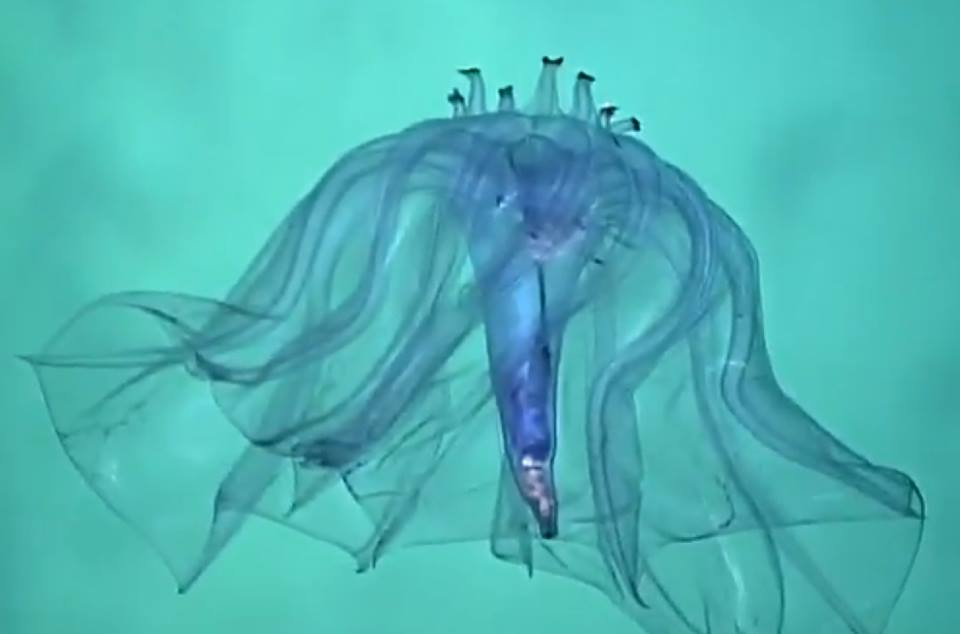
A very rare swimming sea cucumber Pelagothuria natatrix observed in 2017.

The 2017 American Samoa Expedition Part 1: Suesuega o le Moana o Amerika Samoa, was a 14-day telepresence-enabled expedition to explore unknown and poorly understood areas in American Samoa and Samoa with a focus on Rose Atoll Marine National Monument and National Marine Sanctuary of American Samoa. 11 ROV dives were conducted from 250 to 4,000 meters depth. 101 biological specimens (31 primary specimens and 80 associates), were collected including corals, anemones, zoanthids, hydroids, sponges, sea stars, feather stars, brittle stars, urchins, squat lobsters, amphipods, shrimp, barnacles, snails, and polychaete worms. As many as 30 of these specimens could represent new species, and most of the specimens from known species will represent new range records. Along with biological specimens, 30 rock samples for age dating and geochemical analysis were collected to help reveal the geologic history of American Samoa seamounts, atolls, and islands. The dives also obtained samples from the youngest volcanic structures that formed in the Vailulu'u volcanic crater since the previous mapping survey in 2012. More than 12,000 square kilometers of seafloor was mapped, an area 60 times the land area of American Samoa.

During the expedition, a high-resolution video of a monoplacophoran in its natural habitat was filmed for the very first time. Two Neopilina sp. individuals were filmed on the ocean floor. The individuals may belong to an undescribed species, and had five pairs of long gills clearly visible.

=== Windows the Deep 2018: Exploration of the Southeast U.S. Continental Margin ===
From May 22 through July 2, NOAA and partners conducted a two-part, telepresence-enabled ocean exploration expedition on NOAA Ship Okeanos Explorer to collect critical baseline information about unknown and poorly understood deepwater areas of the Southeastern United States.

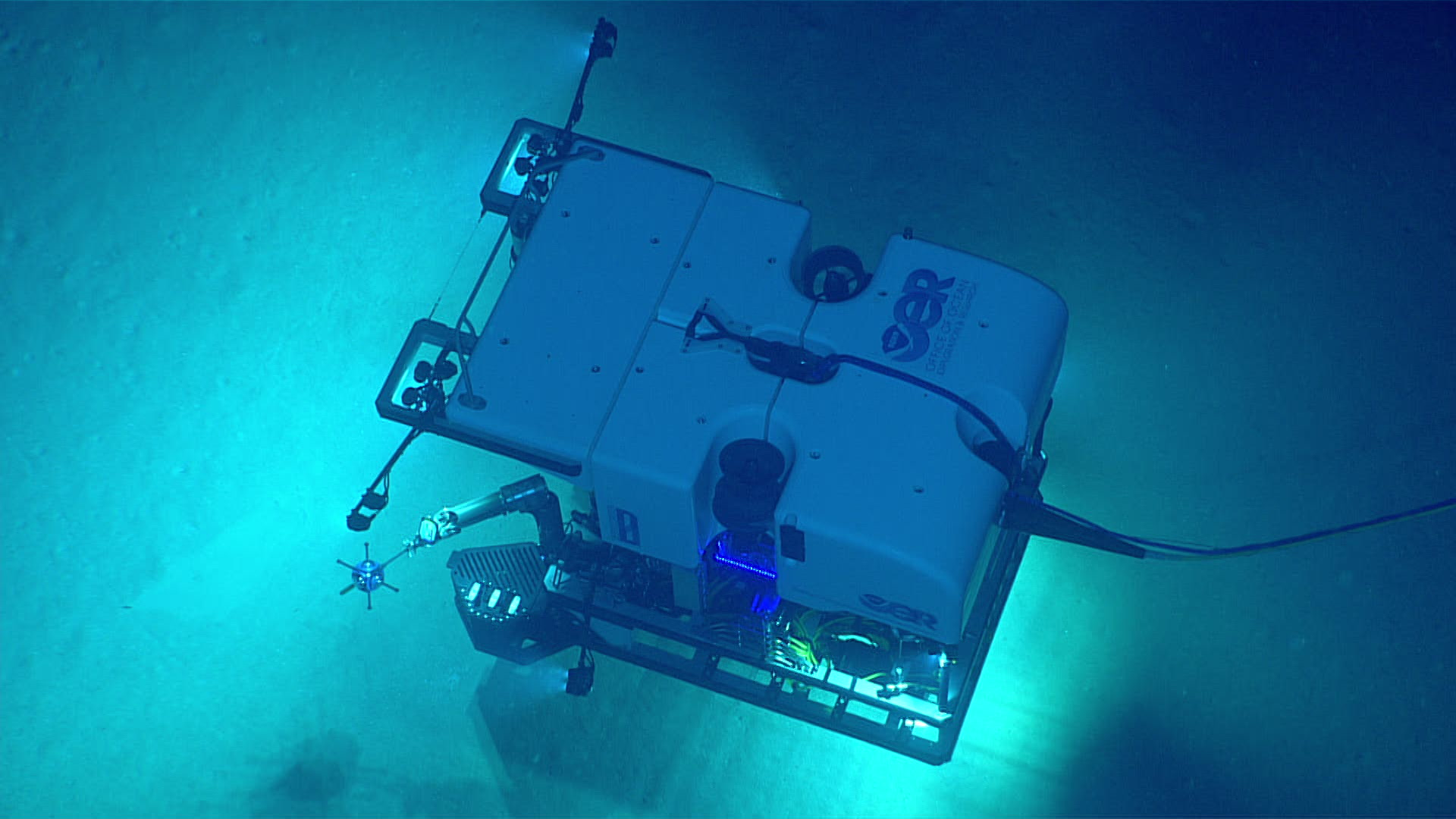
The ROUV Deep Discoverer used

The first leg of this expedition took place from May 22 to June 6 and involved the collection of seafloor and water column mapping data to further improve fundamental understanding in this region and to facilitate remotely operated vehicle (ROV) dive planning. Mapping operations were focused offshore Florida, Georgia, and South Carolina, in the South Atlantic Bight - and more specifically, the Blake Plateau - over some of the least explored ares along the East Coast of the United States. During the mission, the team mapped over 4,900 linear kilometers, resulting in complete seafloor bathymetric coverage of over 16,000 square kilometers- an area larger than the states of Connecticut and Rhode Island combined, or nearly the size of Lake Ontario. ROV dives were conducted from July 14 to July 1 during the expedition's second leg.

During the second leg of the expedition, 24-hour operations consisting of daytime ROV dives with the Deep Discoverer(D2) and overnight mapping. Prior to the first leg of the expedition, there was limited high-resolution multibeam mapping in the deepwater areas offshore the southeastern U.S. Live feeds of the dives could be viewed online in real time.

This was the ninth expedition to test telepresence-enabled mapping operations on NOAA Ship Okeanos Explorer. For this expedition, the mapping team was split between shipboard and shore-based mission teams based at the Exploration Command Center (ECC) at the University of New Hampshire's Center for Coastal and Ocean Mapping (UNH CCOM).

=== Seascape Alaska 2023: Exploration of the Alaskan Deep ===
From May through September, NOAA and partners conducted a series of remotely operated vehicle (ROV) and mapping expeditions onboard NOAA Ship Okeanos Explorer. The expedition was critical in mapping out the Alaskan seafloor which at the time of the expedition was one of the least explored areas in the United States.

The expedition was broken into 6 segments, Seascape Alaska 1 - 6. Seascape Alaska 1 - 3 focused on deep water mapping and ROV exploration of the Aleutian Islands. From May 5 - 26, 2023 Okeanos Explorer mapped nearly 54,000 square kilometers of seafloor in the largely unexplored seafloors regions of the Gulf of Alaska and Aleutian Islands. The data was largely collected during 24-hour-a-day mapping operations. Over the 21 days Okeanos Explorer mapped a distance of 6,368 linear kilometers for a total of 53,923 square kilometers of seafloor. Notable findings included at least three previously unknown marine gas seeps and the sumite of a submarine stratovolcano. During the mapping operations NOAA Ocean Exploration partnered with the Defense POW/MIA Accounting Agency to deploy a small human portable Iver3 UUV and Deep Trekker Pivot RoV with the intent to locate a World War II-era B-25 bomber that was lost in 1944 with nine crew members aboard. The expedition segment ended upon entry into the port of Dutch Harbor, Alaska.

Seascape Alaska 2 was conducted from June 5 - 20, 2023 with the purpose of mapping unexplored seabed around the Aleutian Islands and Gulf of Alaska. Similar to Seascape Alaska 1, mapping operations were conducted 24-hours-a-day with the goal of closing bathymetric gaps in the region. A total of 37,601 square kilometers of bathymetry and associated water column data were collected in deep waters (deeper than 200 meters) within the US EEZ and territorial sea. In addition to mapping operations, NOAA Ocean Exploration mission personnel also collected fisheries sonar observations of biological material in the water column as well as observations of sub-seafloor geological structure and sediment profiles. A focused survey region targeted any potential geological hazards along the Aleutian Trench. The expedition segment ended upon entry into the port of Kodiak, Alaska.

Seascape Alaska 3 was conducted from 14 July - 25 July, 2023. Over the course of the expedition the crew of Okeanos Explorer conducted 6 full RoV dives, mapped nearly 16,000 square kilometers, and collected a wide variety of biological and geological samples to help establish a baseline assessment of the Aleutian benthic habitat. The six dives ranged in depth from 780 to 2,800 meters, with 22 primary biological samples and 6 geological samples taken. Additionally 28 various water samples were taken for eDNA analysis. A major goal of the ROV dives conducted during Seascape Alaska 3 was to locate and characterize deep-sea coral, sponge, and chemosynthetic communities. Discoveries made during the expedition's dives included imaging a potentially newly discovered species of Virgularia sea pen and a potential new species of Cladorhizid sponge. In addition to the potential new species discovered, science party members observed some species of sea stars in the genus Astrocles and Hemicorallium coral, that had not been observed in the region of the dive, suggest extended range for said species.

== Education ==
NOAA is seeking to provide data for, and interact with, students, teachers, and anyone else who is interested. For this purpose it is collaborating with San Francisco's Exploratorium to develop an online educational programs with live broadcast for all ages and for the general public. They will "join the scientific expertise and observational resources of the NOAA with the creativity and educational expertise of the Exploratorium", a press release said. The Okeanos Explorer is designed as an educational tool that can be followed on Twitter.

== See also ==
- NOAAS Okeanos Explorer Gulf of Mexico 2018 Expedition
- NOAAS Okeanos Explorer Gulf of Mexico 2017 Expedition
