= Telepresence technology =

Technology used in deep sea exploration

Telepresence technology is a term used by the National Oceanic and Atmospheric Administration (NOAA) to refer to the combination of satellite technology with the Internet to broadcast information, including video in real-time from cameras used on its remotely operated vehicle (ROV) on Okeanos Explorer. Its ROV will be operating working in a deep sea environment. Data from the ROV is transmitted to a hub based on the land, which then send it to scientists and to the public.

This effort of the Okeanos Explorer has been compared to the lunar landing.

The telepresence technology used by NOAA includes the following:

- deep water mapping, to a depth of 6,000 m
- science-oriented ROV operations
- real-time satellite transmission of data.

The Okeanos Explorer is designed as an educational tool that can be followed on Twitter.
