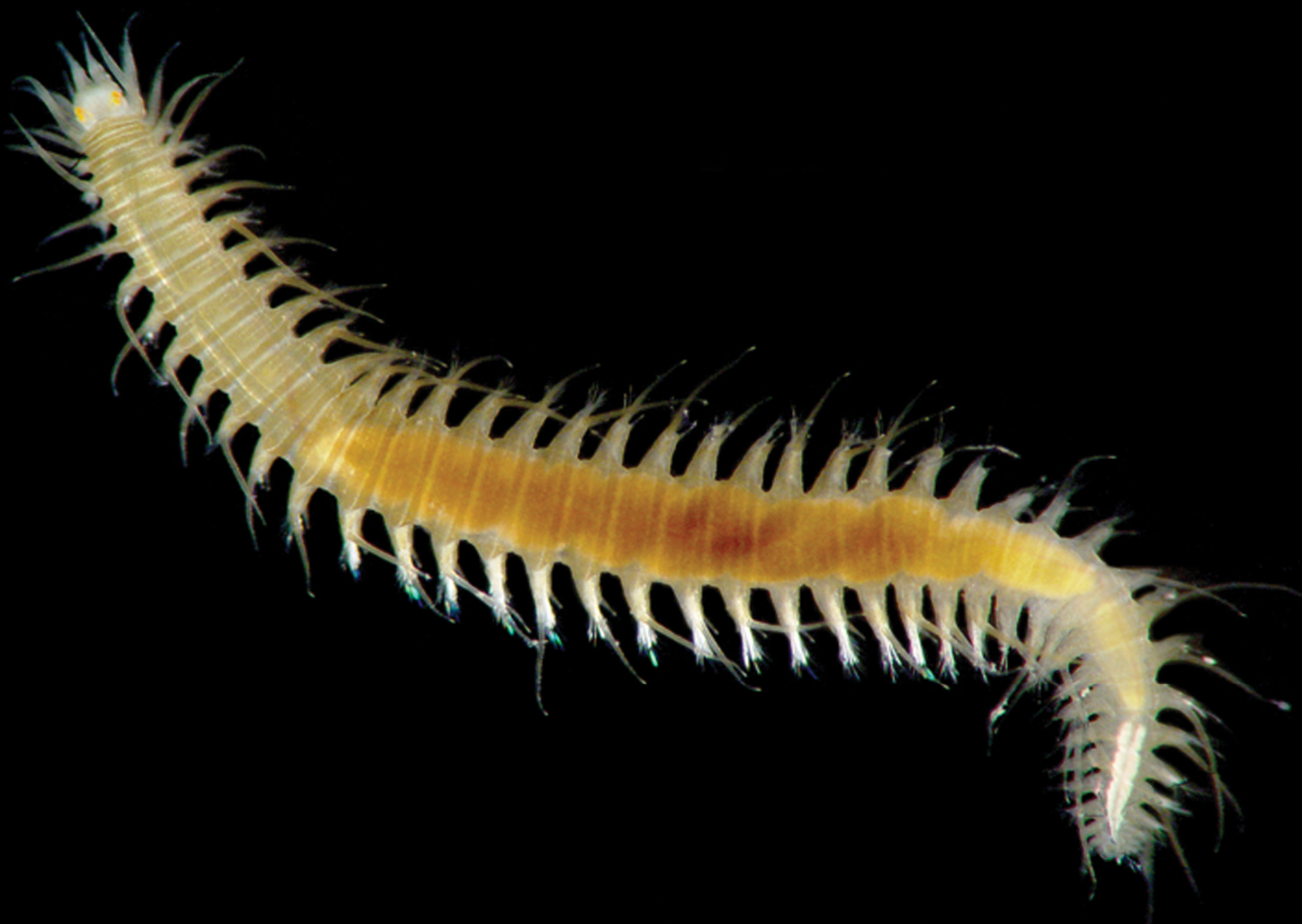
- Oxydromus pugettensis

Scientific classification
- Kingdom: Animalia
- Phylum: Annelida
- Clade: Pleistoannelida
- Subclass: Errantia
- Order: Phyllodocida
- Family: Hesionidae
- Genus: Oxydromus; Grube, 1855

Synonyms
- Podarke Ehlers, 1864

= Oxydromus =

Genus of annelid worms

Oxydromus is a genus of annelids belonging to the family Hesionidae.

The genus has cosmopolitan distribution.

Species:

- Oxydromus adorsosetosus (Hartmann-Schröder, 1985)
- Oxydromus adspersus (Grube, 1874)
- Oxydromus agilis (Ehlers, 1864)
- Oxydromus angolaensis (Hartmann-Schröder, 1974)
- Oxydromus angustifrons (Grube, 1878)
- Oxydromus aucklandicus Willey, 1902
- Oxydromus berrisfordi (Day, 1967)
- Oxydromus blacki (Knox, 1960)
- Oxydromus brevipodius Uchida, 2019
- Oxydromus bunbuku (Uchida, 2004)
- Oxydromus constrictus (Uchida, 2004)
- Oxydromus didymocerus (Schmarda, 1861)
- Oxydromus fauveli (Uchida, 2004)
- Oxydromus flexuosus (Delle Chiaje, 1827)
- Oxydromus furcatus (Hartmann-Schröder, 1962)
- Oxydromus guanicus (Hoagland, 1919)
- Oxydromus humesi (Pettibone, 1961)
- Oxydromus lanai Rizzo & Salazar-Vallejo, 2014
- Oxydromus latifrons (Grube, 1878)
- Oxydromus limicolus (Willey, 1905)
- Oxydromus longicirratus (Knox & Cameron, 1971)
- Oxydromus longifundus (Uchida, 2004)
- Oxydromus longisetis Grube, 1857
- Oxydromus microantennatus (Hutchings & Murray, 1984)
- Oxydromus minutus (Hartmann-Schröder, 1959)
- Oxydromus mutilatus (Treadwell, 1901)
- Oxydromus notospinosus (Rosito, 1983)
- Oxydromus obscurus (Verrill, 1873)
- Oxydromus okudai (Uchida, 2004)
- Oxydromus okupa Martin, Meca & Gil, 2017
- Oxydromus pallidus Claparède, 1864
- Oxydromus parapallidus (Uchida, 2004)
- Oxydromus pelagicus (Rioja, 1923)
- Oxydromus pugettensis (Johnson, 1901)
- Oxydromus spinapandens (Storch & Niggemann, 1967)
- Oxydromus spinosus (Ehlers, 1908)
- Oxydromus viridescens (Ehlers, 1864)
- Oxydromus vittatus (Sars, 1862)
