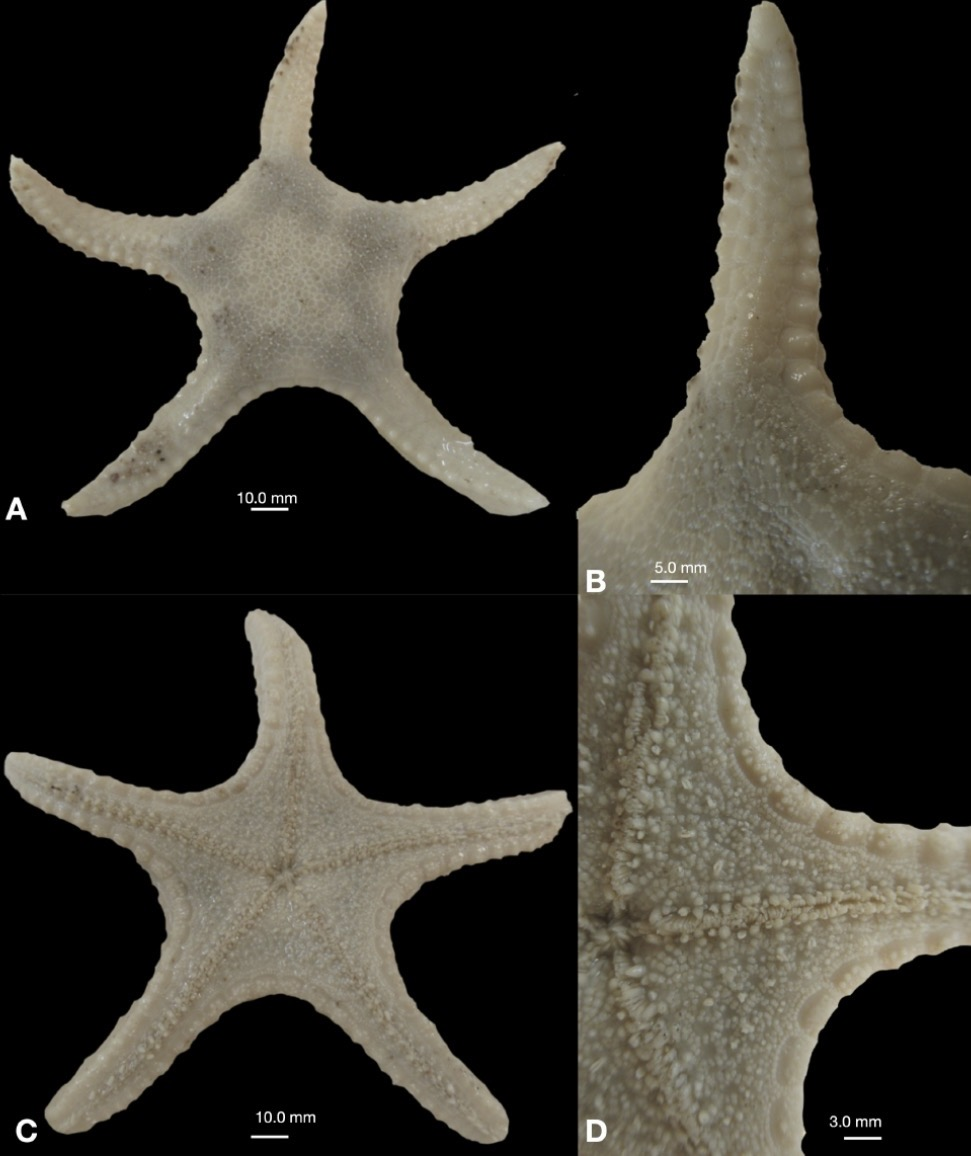

Scientific classification
- Kingdom: Animalia
- Phylum: Echinodermata
- Class: Asteroidea
- Order: Valvatida
- Family: Goniasteridae
- Genus: Atheraster
- Species: A. umbo

Binomial name
- Atheraster umbo Mah, 2026

= Atheraster umbo =

Species of starfish

Atheraster umbo is a deep-sea species of starfish in the family Goniasteridae, first described by Christopher Mah in 2026.

== Description ==
The species has a stout, strongly stellate body with an arm-to-disk ratio of approximately 3.2. Its arms are elongate and triangular, with weakly curved to straight interradial arcs.

The abactinal (upper) surface is covered in irregular, bare plates that extend to the arm tips. The plates on the arms are variably flat to strongly convex and are acutely large relative to the adjacent plates on the central disk. Pedicellariae (pincer-like structures) are abundant, with 4–12 situated within a depression in each interradius.

There are 40–44 marginal plates per interradius (20–22 per side of an arm). On the interradial areas, these plates bear 2–10 small granules or tubercles but are otherwise smooth and bare. Along the arms, each marginal plate features a single distinct tumescence—a raised, knob-like projection. Coarse, nearly tubercular granules are most abundant (1–15) on the interradial marginal plates, decreasing in number and becoming absent along the arm surface.

On the actinal (under) surface, the plates display distinct alveolar pedicellariae, each flanked on either side by bisected hemispherical granules. Furrow spines number 5–15, most commonly 7 or 8. Each adambulacral plate bears a prominent, single, tong-like pedicellaria with quadrate valves, accompanied by a large, thick subambulacral spine that is 2–3 times the thickness of the furrow spines and set at an oblique angle. Each oral plate possesses a large, paddle-shaped pedicellaria, resulting in two per interradius, though these are not symmetrically positioned.

== Distribution and habitat ==
Atheraster umbo has a wide distribution across the South Pacific and Indian Ocean. Documented occurrences include New Caledonia, Tasmania, Lord Howe Island and Cocos (Keeling) Islands.

It is a deep-sea species found at depths ranging from 1,589 to 1,896 metres (5,213 to 6,220 ft).
