= Larry Mayer =

American geophysicist and marine geologist

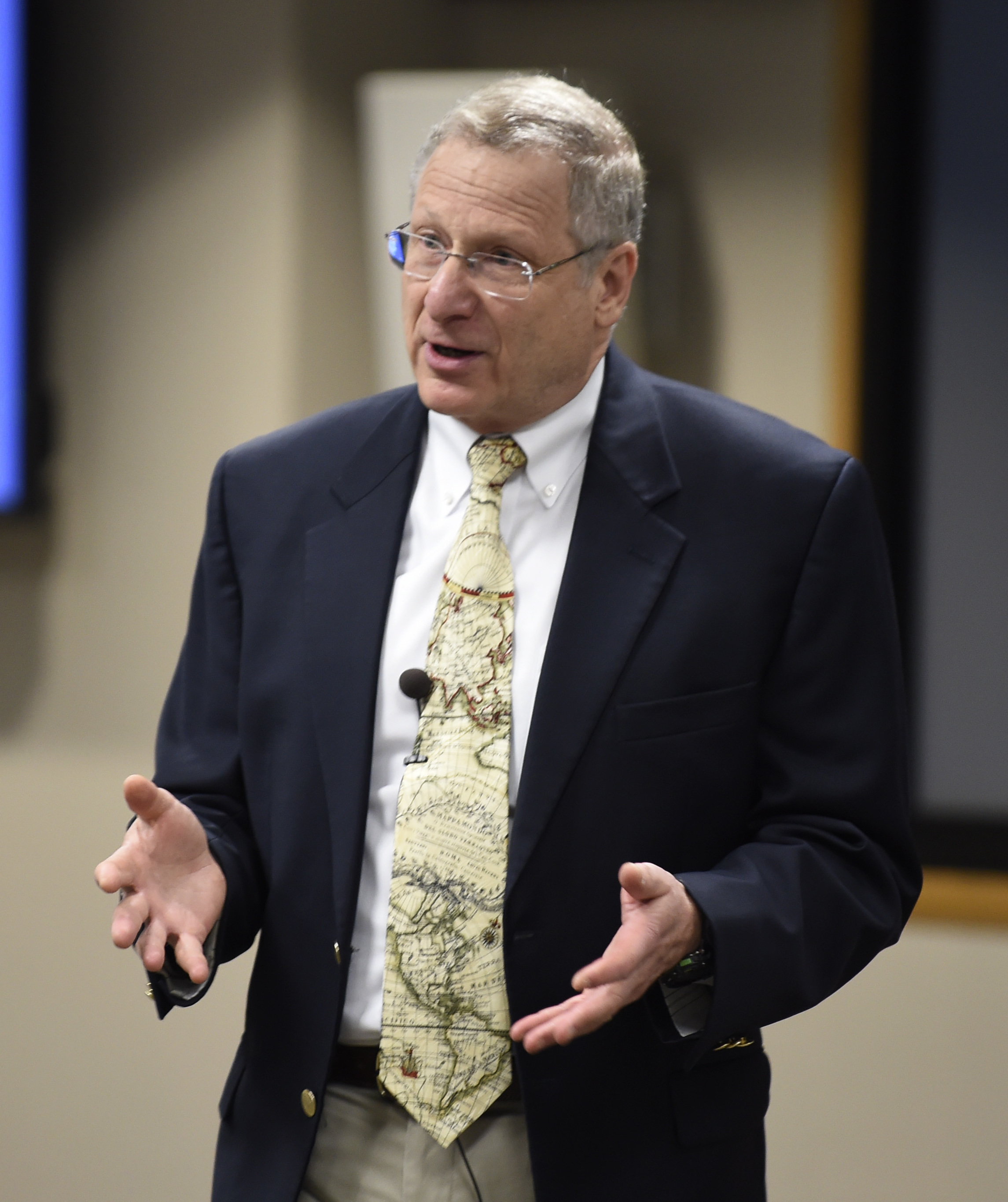
- Mayer in 2018
- Education: Bachelors of Science Geology (1973) University of Rhode Island Ph.D. Marine Geophysics (1979) Scripps Institution of Oceanography
- Scientific career
- Workplaces: University of New Hampshire

Larry Mayer is a distinguished professor of the University of New Hampshire and a former member of the President's Panel on Ocean Exploration. He has a broad background in marine geology and geophysics, reflecting his current contributions in the Ocean Engineering and Earth Science Department at UNH.

After receiving his Ph.D. in Marine Geophysics from the Scripps Institution of Oceanography in 1979, Mayer was selected as an astronaut candidate finalist for NASA's first class of mission specialists. He went on to a Post-Doc at the School of Oceanography at the University of Rhode Island and then to a faculty position at Dalhousie University in 1981 and then became the NSERC Industrial Research Chair in Ocean Mapping at the University of New Brunswick in 1991.

In 2000, Mayer became the founding director of the Center for Coastal and Ocean Mapping at the University of New Hampshire and the co-director of the NOAA/UNH Joint Hydrographic Center. The Centers focus on developing leading edge technology for advancing our ability to map and visualize the seafloor and the water column supporting safe navigation, coastal management and many other aspects of ocean research.

In 2018, Mayer was elected a member of the National Academy of Engineering for the development of techniques and technologies for coastal, Arctic, and ocean floor mapping.
