= Hesioninae =

Scientific classification
- Kingdom: Animalia
- Phylum: Annelida
- Clade: Pleistoannelida
- Subclass: Errantia
- Order: Phyllodocida
- Family: Hesionidae
- Subfamily: Hesioninae; Grube, 1850

Tribes
- Hesionini; Psamathini

Subfamily of annelids

Hesioninae are a subfamily of phyllodocid "bristle worms" (class Polychaeta). They are (like almost all polychaetes) marine organisms; most are found on the continental shelf.

They are divided into two tribes, of which at least the Psamathini seem to represent a good clade.
