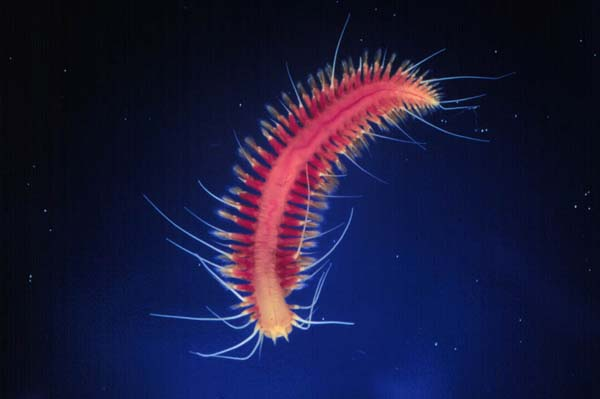
- S. methanicola
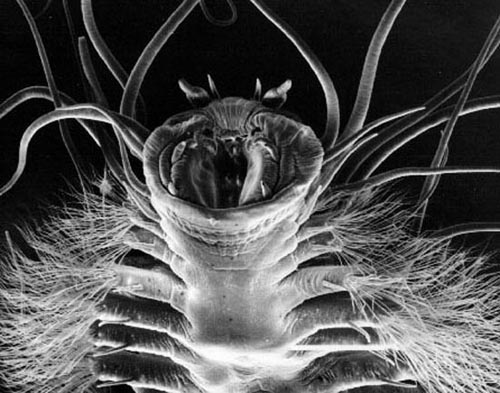
- Close up of the head of S. methanicola

Scientific classification
- Kingdom: Animalia
- Phylum: Annelida
- Clade: Pleistoannelida
- Subclass: Errantia
- Order: Phyllodocida
- Family: Hesionidae
- Genus: Sirsoe
- Species: S. methanicola

Binomial name
- Sirsoe methanicola Desbruyères & Toulmond, 1998

Synonyms
- Hesiocaeca methanicola Desbruyères & Toulmond, 1998

= Sirsoe methanicola =

Species of annelid worm

Sirsoe methanicola is a species of polychaete worm that inhabits methane clathrate deposits in the ocean floor. The worms colonize the methane ice and appear to survive by gleaning bacteria, which in turn metabolize the clathrate.

In 1997, Charles Fisher, professor of biology at Pennsylvania State University, discovered the worm living on mounds of methane ice at a depth of half a mile (~800 m) on the ocean floor in the Gulf of Mexico. Fisher reported that experiments with live specimens showed that mature worms could survive in an anoxic environment for up to 96 hours. The experiments also showed that the larvae were dispersed by currents, and died after 20 days if they did not find a place to feed.

The worm has been found to be able to utilize a range of nitrogen, sulfur, and organic carbon compounds through microbial taxa. These taxa allow the worm to take advantage of the harsh environment by allowing it to feed and gain nutrition through organic compounds that are found in the methane clathrate deposits.
