= Center for Coastal and Ocean Mapping =

Hydrographic research center at the University of New Hampshire

Coordinates: 43°08′08″N 70°56′22″W

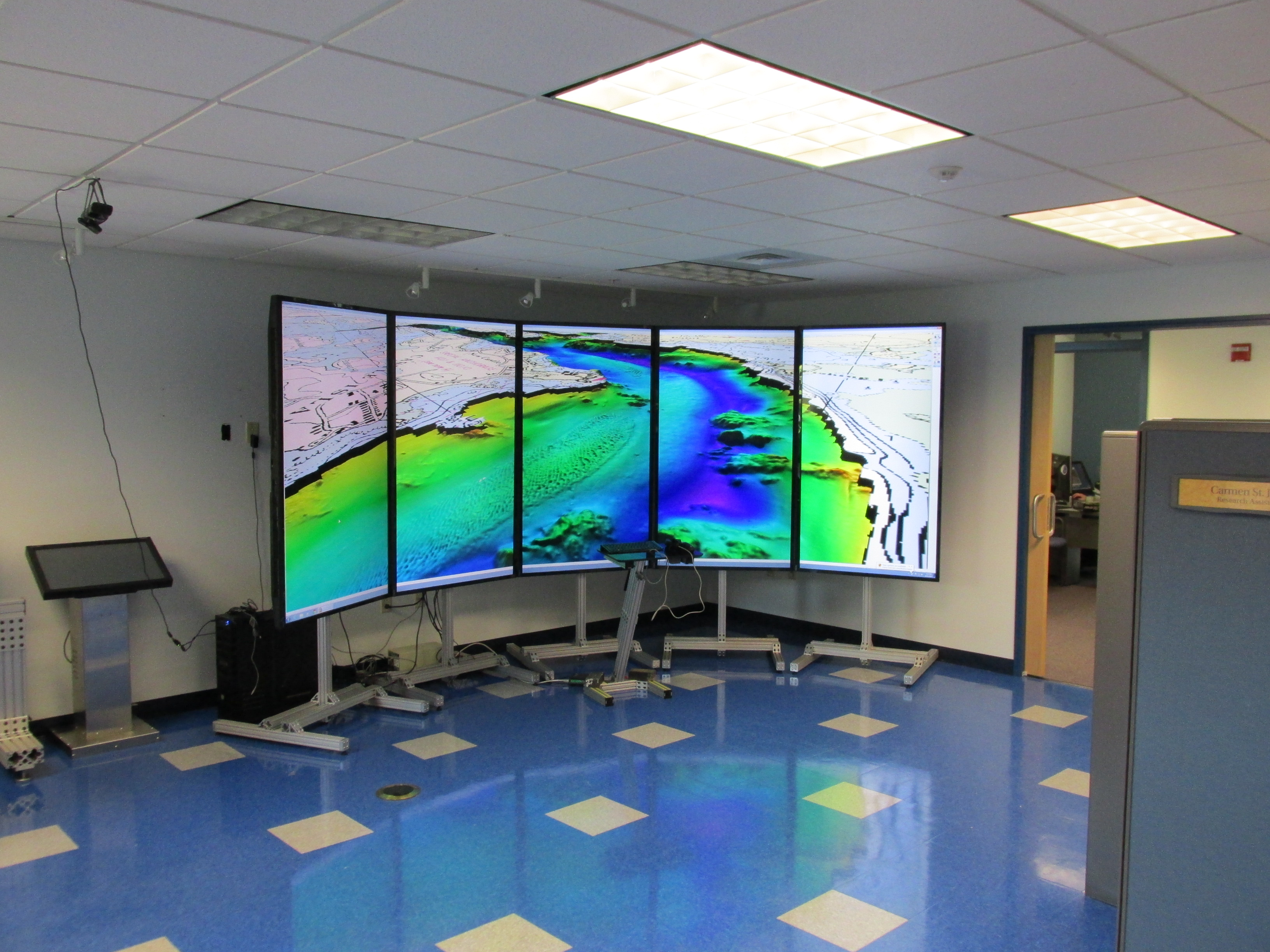
Data Visualization Lab

The Center for Coastal and Ocean Mapping (CCOM) / NOAA-UNH Joint Hydrographic Center (JHC) was founded in 2000 by Dr. Larry Mayer to find ways to process the massive amounts of data coming from sonar systems at rates commensurate with data collection; that is, to make the data ready for chart production as rapidly as the data could be collected.

The main objective of the CCOM/JHC is to enhance methods for ocean mapping and hydrology, with the target to also advance the knowledge of the discipline's future generation. This objective underlies the aim of the JHC and its cooperative partnerships with the University of New Hampshire and the National Oceanic and Atmospheric Administration to create a national center for expertise in ocean mapping and hydrographic sciences.

The center is located in the Chase Ocean Engineering building on the campus of the University of New Hampshire in Durham, New Hampshire, United States.

The center works on a wide range of marine research topics, including:

- Hydrography
- Improved bathymetric processing
- Improved side-scan sonar and backscatter processing
- Data visualization, with emphasis on whale tracking, flow visualization, and mid-water fish
- Seafloor characterization
- Lidar
- Photographic mosaic
- Law of the Sea mapping for the United States
- Electronic chart of the future and the marine Automatic Identification System
- Acoustic positioning and tracking

== See also ==
- Seafloor mapping
