= Marginal distribution (biology) =

Discussion of factors limiting the occurrence of a species

The geographical limits to the distribution of a species are determined by biotic or abiotic factors. Core populations are those occurring within the centre of the range, and marginal populations (also called peripheral populations) are found at the boundary of the range.

The inability of a species to expand its range beyond a certain geographic area is because of some limiting factor or factors to which the species cannot successfully adapt. In some cases, geographical range limits are entirely predictable, such as the physical barrier of an ocean for a terrestrial species. In other cases the specific reasons why species do not pass these boundaries are unknown, however, ecology is the main determinant of the distribution of a species. The fitness of a species falls at the edges of its distributional range, with population growth and fitness falling to zero beyond where a species can survive.

For many species of invertebrate animals, the exact geographic range limits have never been precisely ascertained, because not enough scientific field work has been carried out in many parts of the world to map distribution more precisely, therefore finding a range extension for species, especially marine species, is not an uncommon occurrence.

Marginal distributions can have conservation implications.

== Terminology ==
The science of understanding the distributions of organisms is known as chorology, a branch of biogeography. The core population of a species are those individuals occurring within the centre of the range. Although one cannot ever truly know the ideal niche of a particular species, it can be approximated from the core of the distribution, this is known as the "realized ecological niche". Marginal or peripheral populations are those found at the boundary of the range. When the distribution of a species is changing, the leading edge populations are at the expanding geographic edge of the distribution range whilst rear edge populations are undergoing retreat.

The central‐marginal hypothesis, also sometimes called the "central-peripheral population hypothesis", posits that there is less genetic diversity and greater inter‐population genetic differentiation at the range margins, as compared to the range cores. This is based on the assumption that the habitat is most ideal at the centre of a distribution and ecological conditions decline towards the margin. Because the population size at the margin is likely to be smaller, genetic drift can have a larger effect and reduce the genetic variation of marginal populations. Reduced gene flow between central and peripheral populations also limits the genetic diversity at the margins. High selection pressure, due to a less than ideal habitat at the margin, furthermore reduces genetic diversity. Although exceptions to this hypothesis are common, in general this rule appears to hold empirically true. The spatial distribution often differs, with the population being more dense in the centre as opposed to the margins, this can often have a simple probability distribution pattern. The gene flow between central and peripheral populations may prevent range expansion when it does not allow the gene pool at margin to differentiate. Conditions at the centre of the range differ from those at the periphery, therefore adapted alleles at the centre may not benefit marginal populations experiencing different conditions. The asymmetrical gene flow hypothesis posits that there is more gene flow from central to peripheral populations. Empirical data supporting this theory is less robust.

When circumstances, usually climatic, restrict the distribution to a small area, this is known as a refugium. In Europe, for example, the geographical spokes sticking out of the continent in the south - the Iberian Peninsula, Italy and the Balkans served as refugia for warmth-adapted species during the Ice Ages.

== Abiotic factors ==
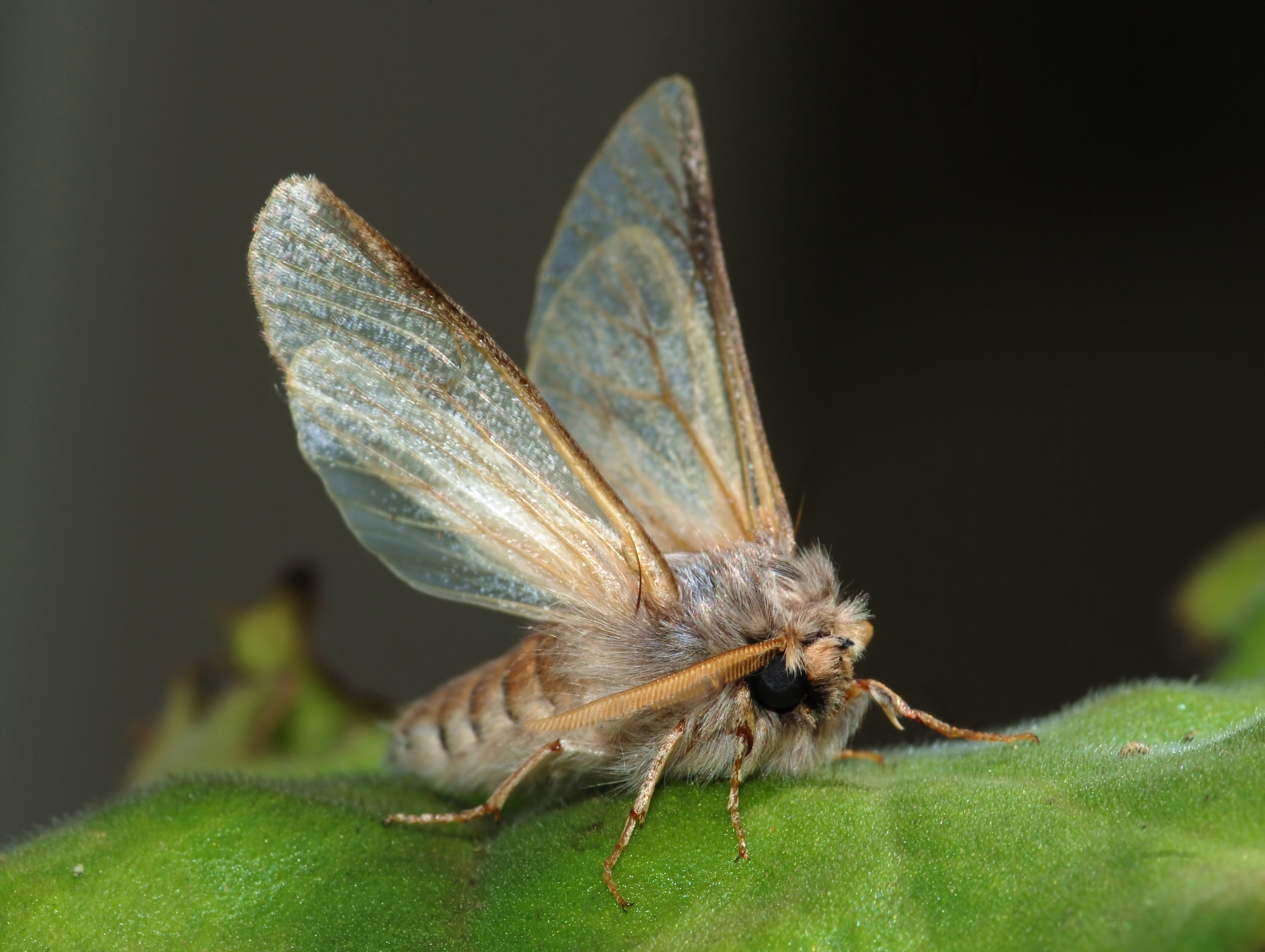
The pine moth, Thaumetopoea pityocampa, expanded its range northward in France.

Gradients in any abiotic factor, such as climate, create physiological barriers to dispersal. All species have limits of tolerance to abiotic factors. Too much or too little of anything can lower their survival and reproductive success and cause reduced fitness. Changes in temperature resulting from global warming, for example, may cause a species to change its geographical distribution northward. Precipitation can also be a key determinant in limiting the geographic range edges of species. This is often seen in organisms with high water demands, whose survival and reproduction is limited by dry conditions. Moisture in the soil can also put limits on the distribution of an organism. There are many other abiotic factors that can determine a species range, including dissolved oxygen, conductivity, alkalinity and pH.

== Biotic factors ==
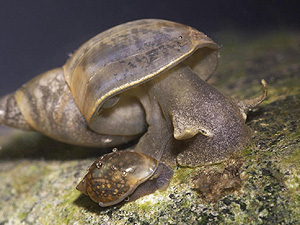
Individuals of the freshwater gastropod Lymnaea stagnalis were found to have higher occurrences of trematode parasites at the edge of their distribution as compared with those of the core.

Interactions between organisms can cause limitations to the distribution of a species. One interaction that may limit a distribution is predation, where prey species are limited from a particular area by very efficient predators, or where these predators may permit certain prey to have larger ranges. Interspecific competition is another common determinant of the distribution of individual species. Where two similar species share an overlapping range, competition often causes the distributions to shift to exclude one of the two. The geographic range of one species may be linked to another, where the range of one species cannot extend independent of the other. This is seen in parasitism or mutualism, where survival is not possible without the hosts. Parasitism can also play another role in determining the distribution of a species: marginal populations with suboptimal habitats can carry a higher parasite load. This may be because less favourable conditions at the margins of a distribution lead to lower resistance to infection.

=== Anthropogenic factors ===
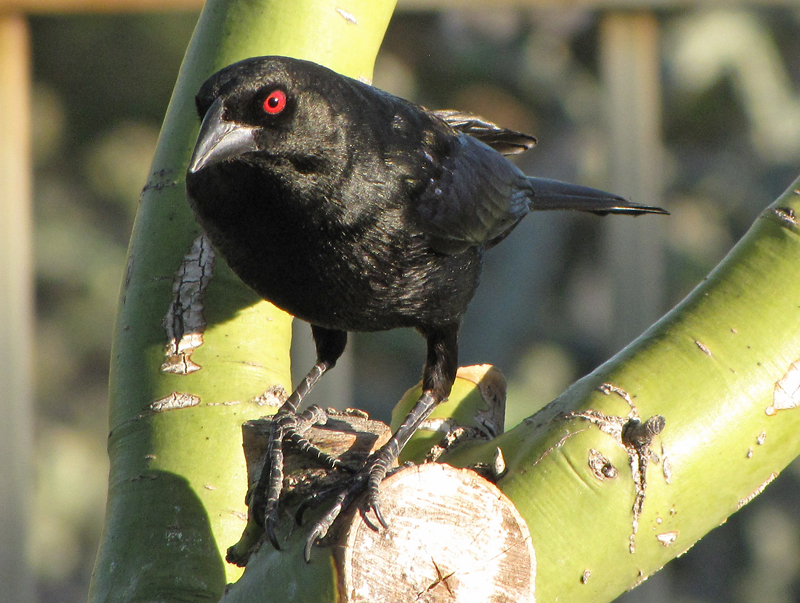
The bronzed cowbird, Molothrus aeneus, continues to expand its range in New Mexico and Texas due to deforestation.

Humans can cause changes to the environment and alter distributions. Deforestation can increase the habitat of certain species and allow them to expand their distribution, or change distributions in response to a decrease in habitat. Recent changes in average temperatures, which may be caused by humans, are causing changes in the distribution of some species, such as northward expansion. Humans have also initiated many range expansions by introducing species to new locations both intentionally and accidentally. These species may survive and reproduce in these new locations and thus expand their distribution. These species may also cause changes in the distributions of native species that cannot tolerate the novel competition.

== Combined influences ==
In most cases combinations of factors are responsible for limiting the geographic range edge of species. Abiotic and biotic factors may work together in determining the range of a species. An example might be some obligate seeder plants where the distribution is limited by the presence of wildfires, which are needed to allow their seed bank to germinate, and also use dispersal of their seeds mediated by ants.

== See also ==
- Edge effects
- Species distribution
- Niche construction
- Mutualism Parasitism Continuum
