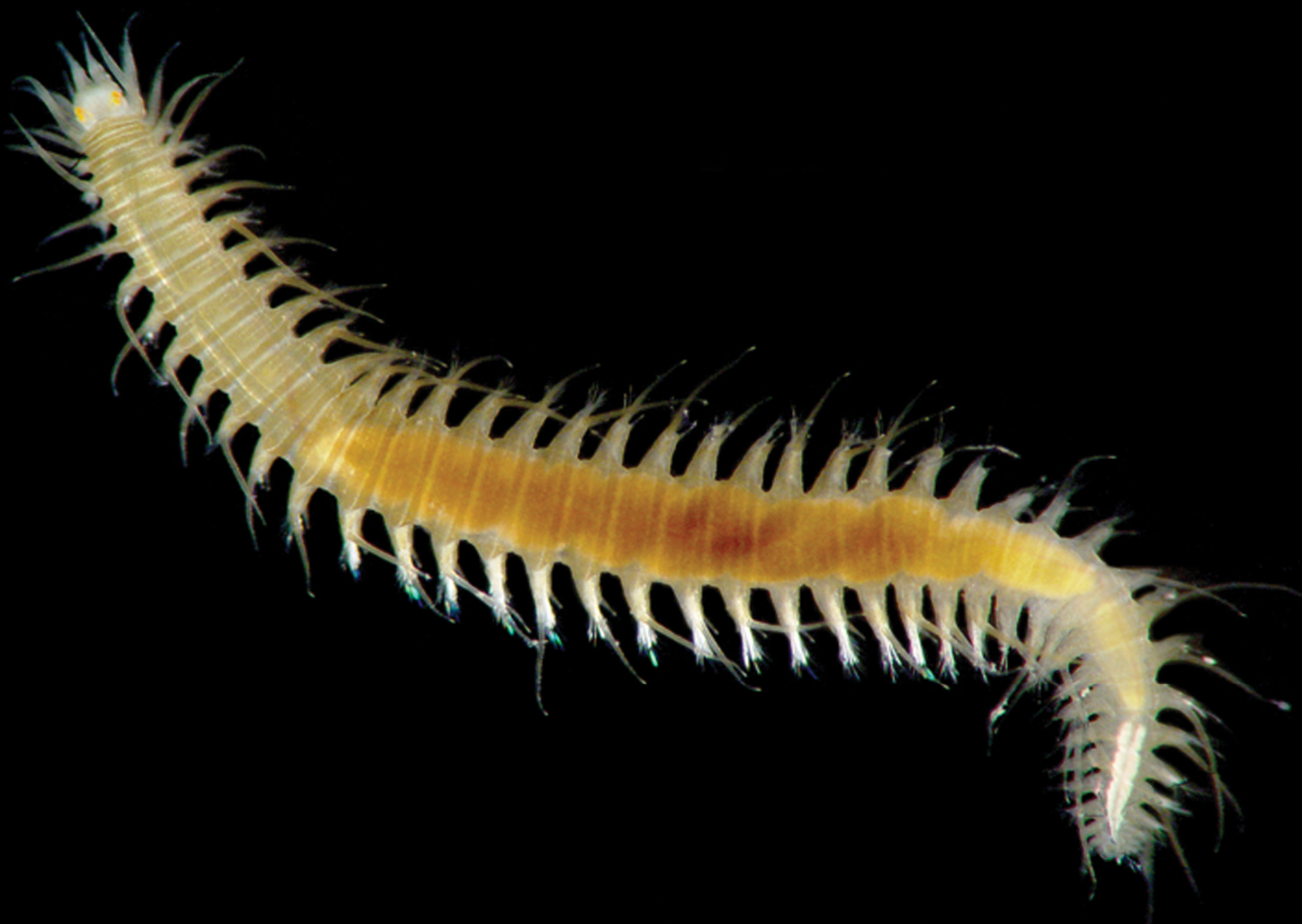
- Oxydromus pugettensis

Scientific classification
- Kingdom: Animalia
- Phylum: Annelida
- Clade: Pleistoannelida
- Subclass: Errantia
- Order: Phyllodocida
- Suborder: Nereidiformia
- Family: Hesionidae; Grube, 1850

Subfamilies
- Hesioninae; Microphthalminae; Ophiodrominae and see text

= Hesionidae =

Family of annelids

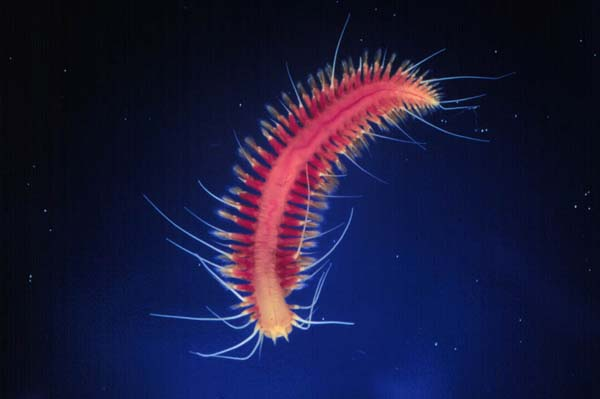
Sirsoe methanicola

Hesionidae are a family of phyllodocid bristle worms (class Polychaeta). They are (like almost all polychaetes) marine organisms. Most are found on the continental shelf; Hesiocaeca methanicola is found on methane ice, where it feeds on bacterial biofilms.

A characteristic apomorphy of the Hesionidae are the cirrophores of the anterior segments, which are well-developed cup-like sheaths; the cirri of the subsequent segments insert into the parapodia directly, or with just a vestigial cirrophore.

== Systematics ==
As phyllodocids, the Hesionidae belong to the order Aciculata, one of the three main clades of polychaetes. They appear to be part of the basal radiation of the main lineage of phyllodocids, alongside such families as the ragworms (Nereididae), the Pilargidae and Sphaerodoridae which are closely related to each other, the very ancient Syllidae, and perhaps the more advanced catworms (Nephtyidae).

Numerous genera are still treated as Hesionidae incertae sedis, not reliably assignable to either of the three generally recognized hesionid subfamilies:

- Alikuhnia (including Anophthalmus Alikunhi, 1949 (non Schmidt, 1844: preoccupied))
- Anoplonereis Giard, 1882
- Cirrosyllis Schmarda, 1861
- Elisesione Salazar-Vallejo, 2016
- Friedericiella
- Hesiodeira Blake & Hilbig, 1990
- Hesiolyra Blake, 1985 (sometimes separated in monotypic subfamily Hesiolyrinae)
- Hesionella Hartman, 1939
- Heteropodarke Pleijel, 1999
- Leocratides Ehlers, 1908
- Mahesia Westheide, 2000
- Neopodarke Hartman, 1965
- Orseis Ehlers, 1864
- Oxydromus Grube, 1855
- Parahesione Pettibone, 1956
- Parapodarke Czerniavsky, 1882
- Periboea Ehlers, 1864
- Podarke Ehlers, 1864
- Pseudosyllidia Czerniavsky, 1882
- Sinohesione Westheide, Purschke & Mangerich, 1994
- Sirsoe Pleijel, 1998
- Struwela Hartmann-Schröder, 1959
