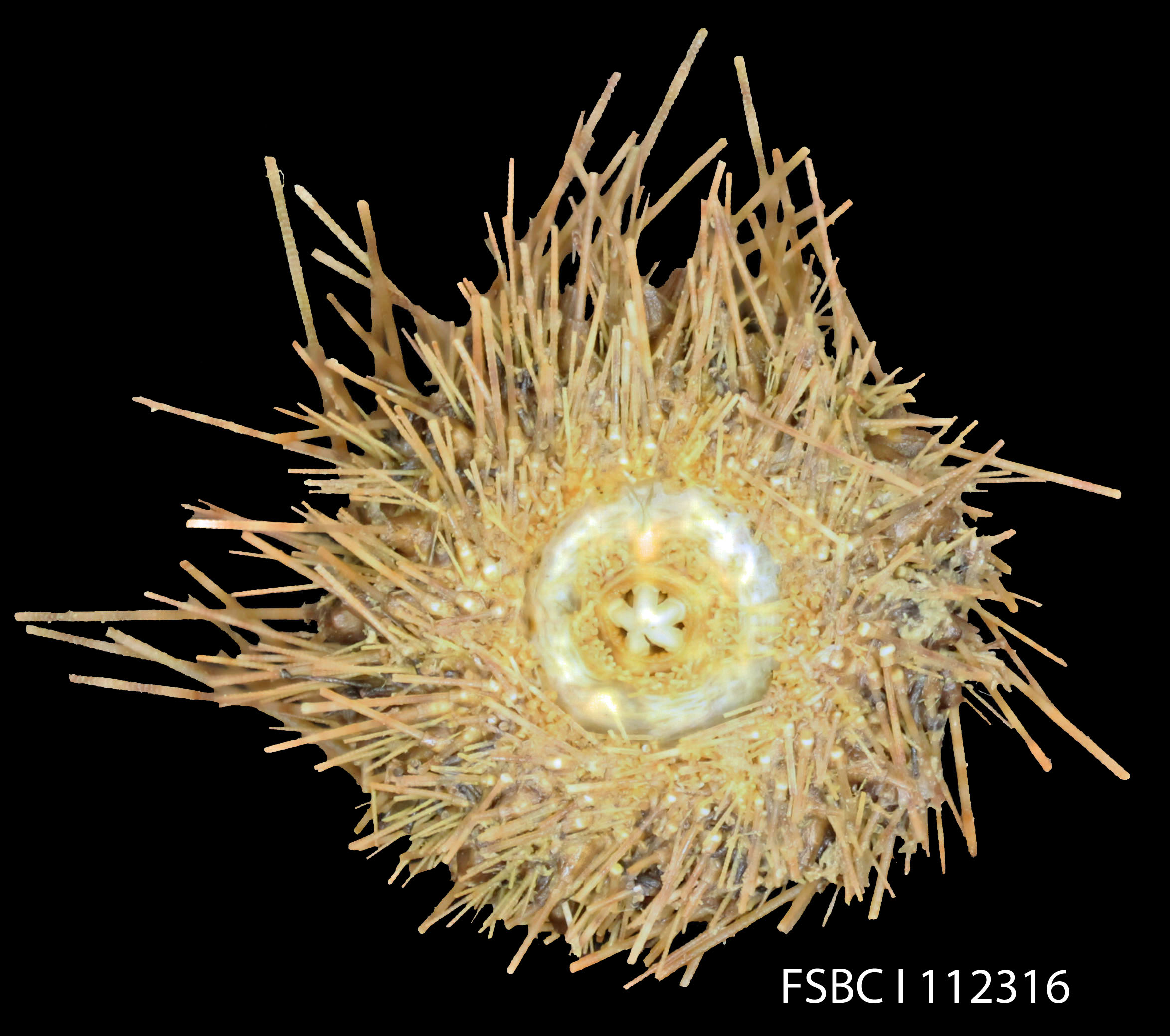

Scientific classification
- Kingdom: Animalia
- Phylum: Echinodermata
- Class: Echinoidea
- Order: Diadematoida
- Family: Diadematidae
- Genus: Centrostephanus
- Species: C. longispinus
- Subspecies: C. l. rubricingulus

Trinomial name
- Centrostephanus longispinus rubricingulus (H.L. Clark, 1921)

Synonyms
- Centrostephanus rubricingulus (Hubert Lyman Clark, 1921)

= Centrostephanus longispinus rubricingulus =

Subspecies of sea urchin

Centrostephanus longispinus rubricingulus is a subspecies of sea urchins of the Family Diadematidae. Their armour is covered with spines. C. l. rubricingulus was first scientifically described in 1921 by Hubert Lyman Clark.

== See also ==
- Centrostephanus nitidus
- Centrostephanus sylviae
