= Caenopedina capensis =

Scientific classification
- Kingdom: Animalia
- Phylum: Echinodermata
- Class: Echinoidea
- Order: Pedinoida
- Family: Pedinidae
- Genus: Caenopedina
- Species: C. capensis

Binomial name
- Caenopedina capensis H.L. Clark, 1923

Species of sea urchin

Caenopedina capensis is a species of sea urchins of the Family Pedinidae. Their armour is covered with spines. Caenopedina capensis was first scientifically described in 1923 by Hubert Lyman Clark.
