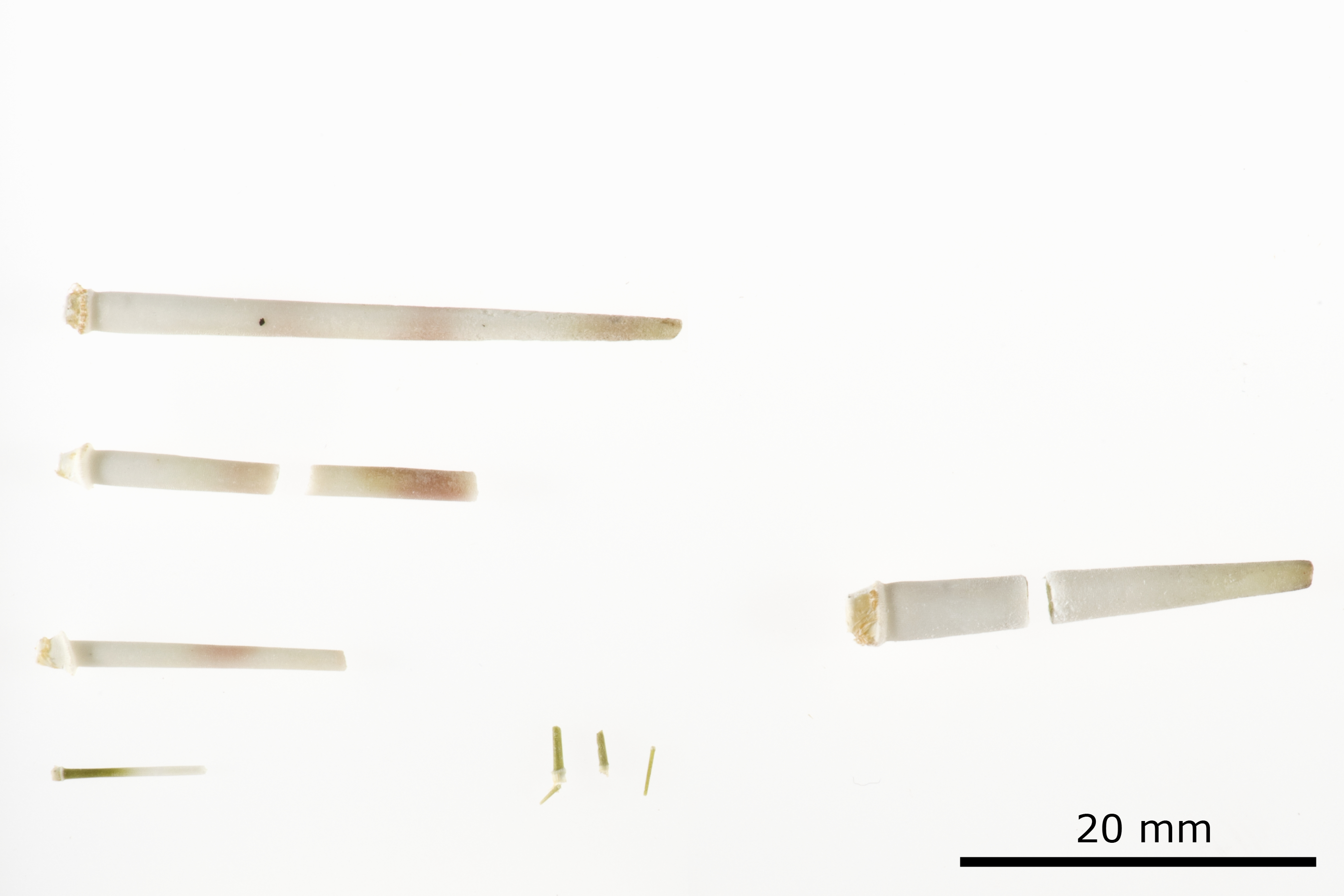
- Coenapedia Superba

Scientific classification
- Kingdom: Animalia
- Phylum: Echinodermata
- Class: Echinoidea
- Order: Pedinoida
- Family: Pedinidae
- Genus: Caenopedina
- Species: C. superba

Binomial name
- Caenopedina superba (H.L. Clark, 1925)

= Caenopedina superba =

Species of sea urchin

Caenopedina superba is a species of sea urchins of the family Pedinidae. Their armour is covered with spines. Caenopedina superba was first scientifically described in 1925 by Hubert Lyman Clark.
