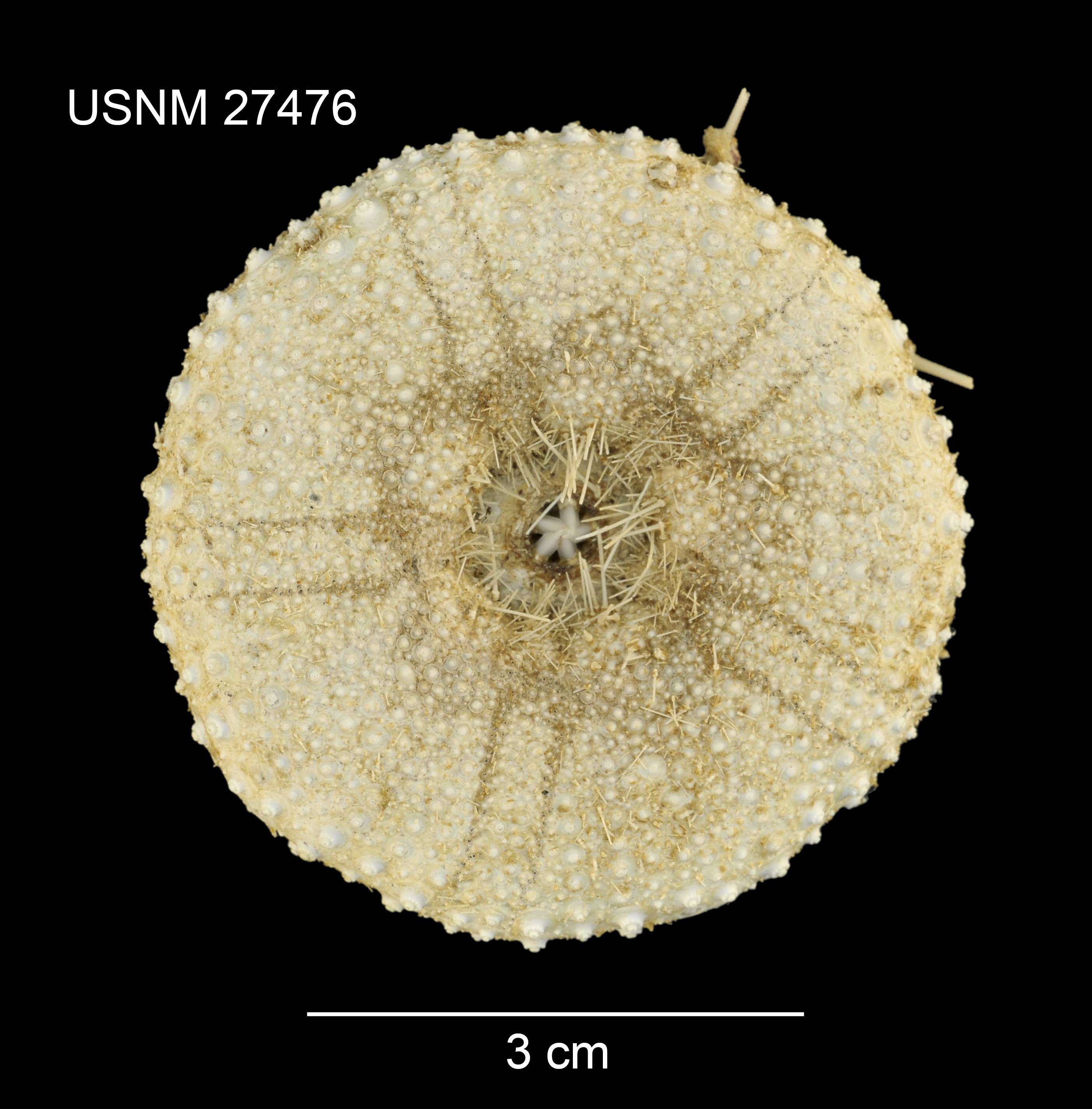

Scientific classification
- Kingdom: Animalia
- Phylum: Echinodermata
- Class: Echinoidea
- Order: Diadematoida
- Family: Diadematidae
- Genus: Chaetodiadema
- Species: C. pallidum

Binomial name
- Chaetodiadema pallidum A. Agassiz & H.L. Clark, 1907

= Chaetodiadema pallidum =

Species of sea urchin

Chaetodiadema pallidum is a species of sea urchins of the Family Diadematidae. Their armour is covered with spines. Chaetodiadema pallidum was first scientifically described in 1907 by Alexander Emanuel Agassiz and Hubert Lyman Clark.

== See also ==
- Chaetodiadema japonicum
- Chaetodiadema keiense
- Chaetodiadema tuberculatum
