= Caenopedina depressa =

Scientific classification
- Kingdom: Animalia
- Phylum: Echinodermata
- Class: Echinoidea
- Order: Pedinoida
- Family: Pedinidae
- Genus: Caenopedina
- Species: C. depressa

Binomial name
- Caenopedina depressa (Koehler, 1927)

Species of sea urchin

Caenopedina depressa is a species of sea urchins of the Family Pedinidae. Their armour is covered with spines. Caenopedina depressa was first scientifically described in 1927 by Koehler.
