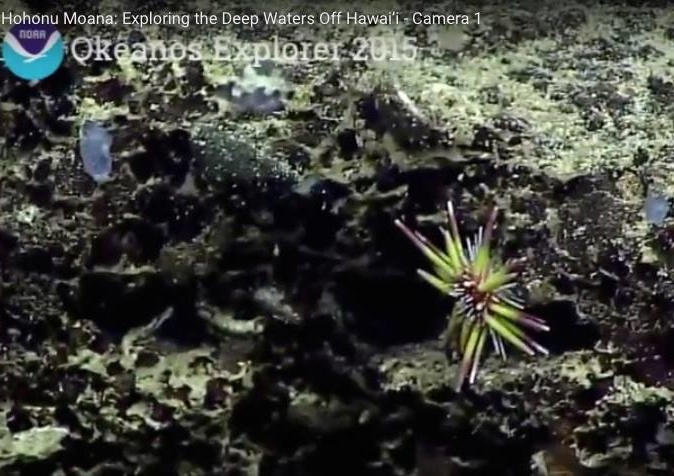
- Caenopedina pulchella

Scientific classification
- Kingdom: Animalia
- Phylum: Echinodermata
- Class: Echinoidea
- Order: Pedinoida
- Family: Pedinidae
- Genus: Caenopedina
- Species: C. pulchella

Binomial name
- Caenopedina pulchella (Agassiz & Clark, 1907)

= Caenopedina pulchella =

Species of sea urchin

Caenopedina pulchella is a species of sea urchins of the family Pedinidae. Their armour is covered with spines. Caenopedina pulchella was first scientifically described in 1907 by Alexander Emanuel Agassiz and Hubert Lyman Clark.
