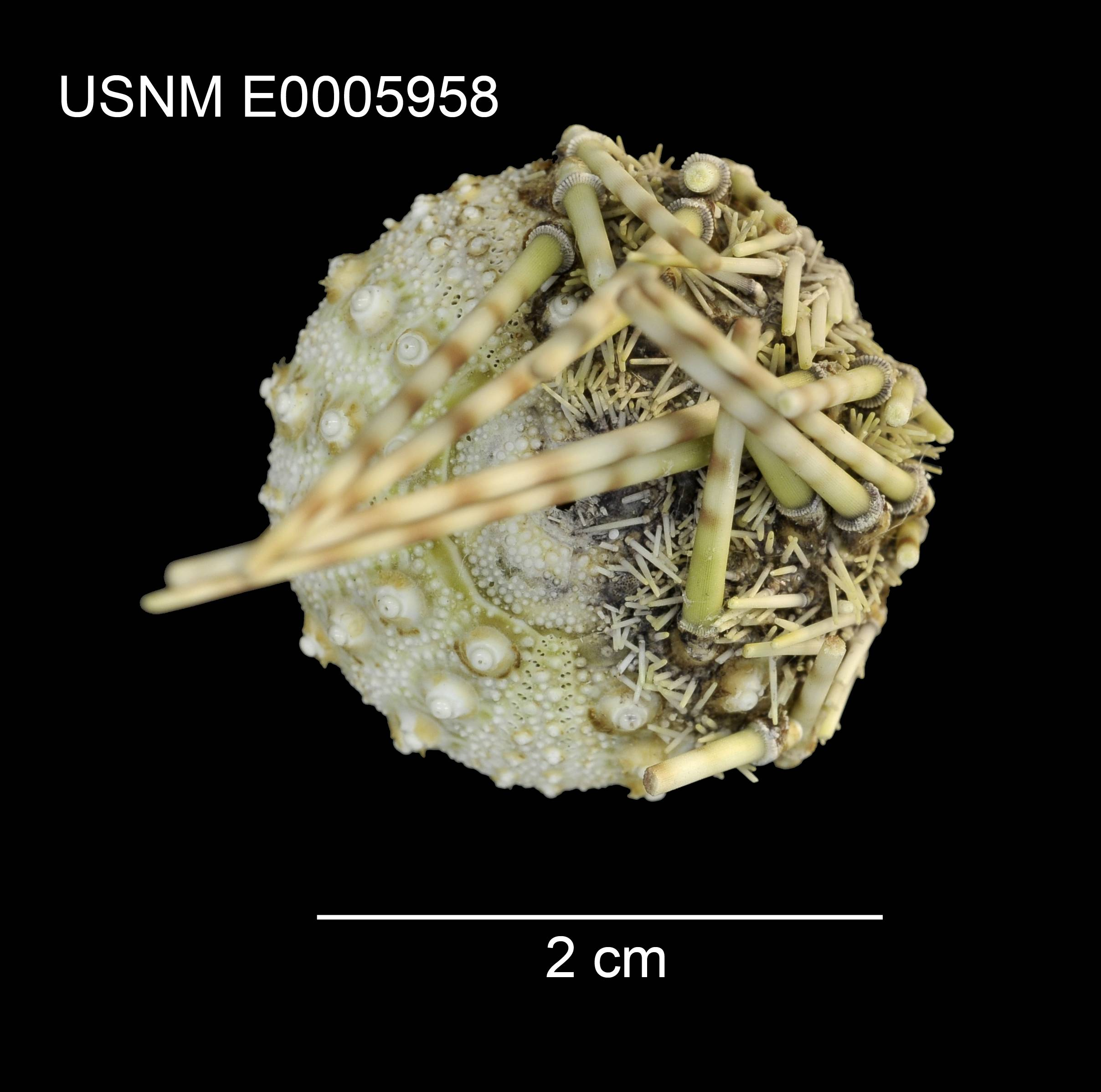

Scientific classification
- Kingdom: Animalia
- Phylum: Echinodermata
- Class: Echinoidea
- Order: Pedinoida
- Family: Pedinidae
- Genus: Caenopedina
- Species: C. annulata

Binomial name
- Caenopedina annulata (Ole Theodor Jensen Mortensen, 1940)

= Caenopedina annulata =

Species of sea urchin

Caenopedina annulata is a species of sea urchins of the Family Pedinidae. Their armour is covered with spines. Caenopedina annulata was first scientifically described in 1940 by Ole Theodor Jensen Mortensen.
