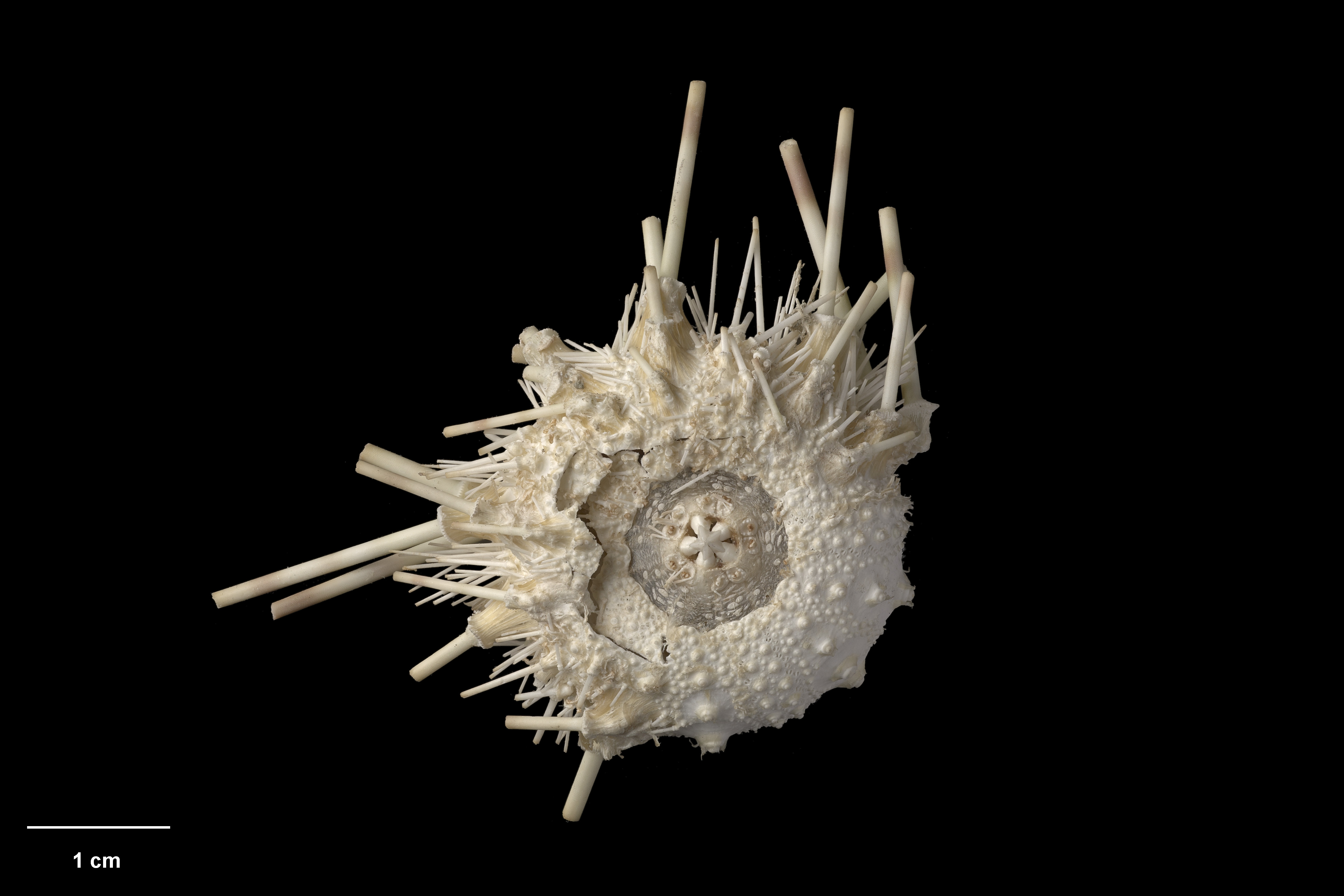

Scientific classification
- Kingdom: Animalia
- Phylum: Echinodermata
- Class: Echinoidea
- Order: Pedinoida
- Family: Pedinidae
- Genus: Caenopedina
- Species: C. novaezealandiae

Binomial name
- Caenopedina novaezealandiae (Pawson, 1964)

= Caenopedina novaezealandiae =

Species of sea urchin

Caenopedina novaezealandiae is a species of sea urchins of the Family Pedinidae. Their armour is covered with spines. Caenopedina novaezealandiae was first scientifically described in 1964 by Pawson.
