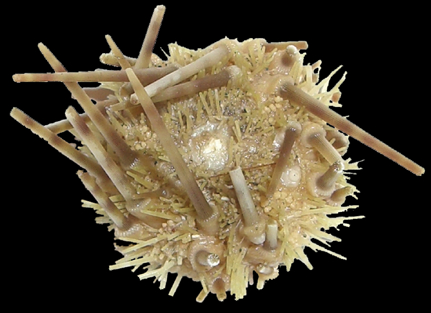

Scientific classification
- Kingdom: Animalia
- Phylum: Echinodermata
- Class: Echinoidea
- Order: Pedinoida
- Family: Pedinidae
- Genus: Caenopedina
- Species: C. mirabilis

Binomial name
- Caenopedina mirabilis (Döderlein, 1885)

= Caenopedina mirabilis =

Species of sea urchin

Caenopedina mirabilis is a species of sea urchin in the family Pedinidae. It was first scientifically described in 1885 by Ludwig Döderlein.

This species is known in Chinese as 异新平海胆.

It was originally described as Hemipedina mirabilis by Döderlein and later referred to as Coenopedina mirabilis by Ohshima (1927).

Caenopedina mirabilis is distributed in the Western Pacific Ocean, including the East China Sea, and in cold-temperate to sub-Antarctic waters off Western Australia, New South Wales, and south of Tasmania. Specimens have been collected from deep-sea environments in these regions.

This species is also known in Japanese as otome-uni (乙女海胆 / オトメウニ, "Maiden Sea Urchin").

The type locality for this species is Japan.
