= Caenopedina cubensis =

Scientific classification
- Kingdom: Animalia
- Phylum: Echinodermata
- Class: Echinoidea
- Order: Pedinoida
- Family: Pedinidae
- Genus: Caenopedina
- Species: C. cubensis

Binomial name
- Caenopedina cubensis (A. Agassiz, 1869)

Species of sea urchin

Caenopedina cubensis is a species of sea urchins of the Family Pedinidae. Their armor is covered with spines. Caenopedina cubensis was first scientifically described in 1869 by Alexander Emanuel Agassiz.
