= Chaetodiadema tuberculatum =

Scientific classification
- Kingdom: Animalia
- Phylum: Echinodermata
- Class: Echinoidea
- Order: Diadematoida
- Family: Diadematidae
- Genus: Chaetodiadema
- Species: C. tuberculatum

Binomial name
- Chaetodiadema tuberculatum (Clark, 1909)

Species of sea urchin

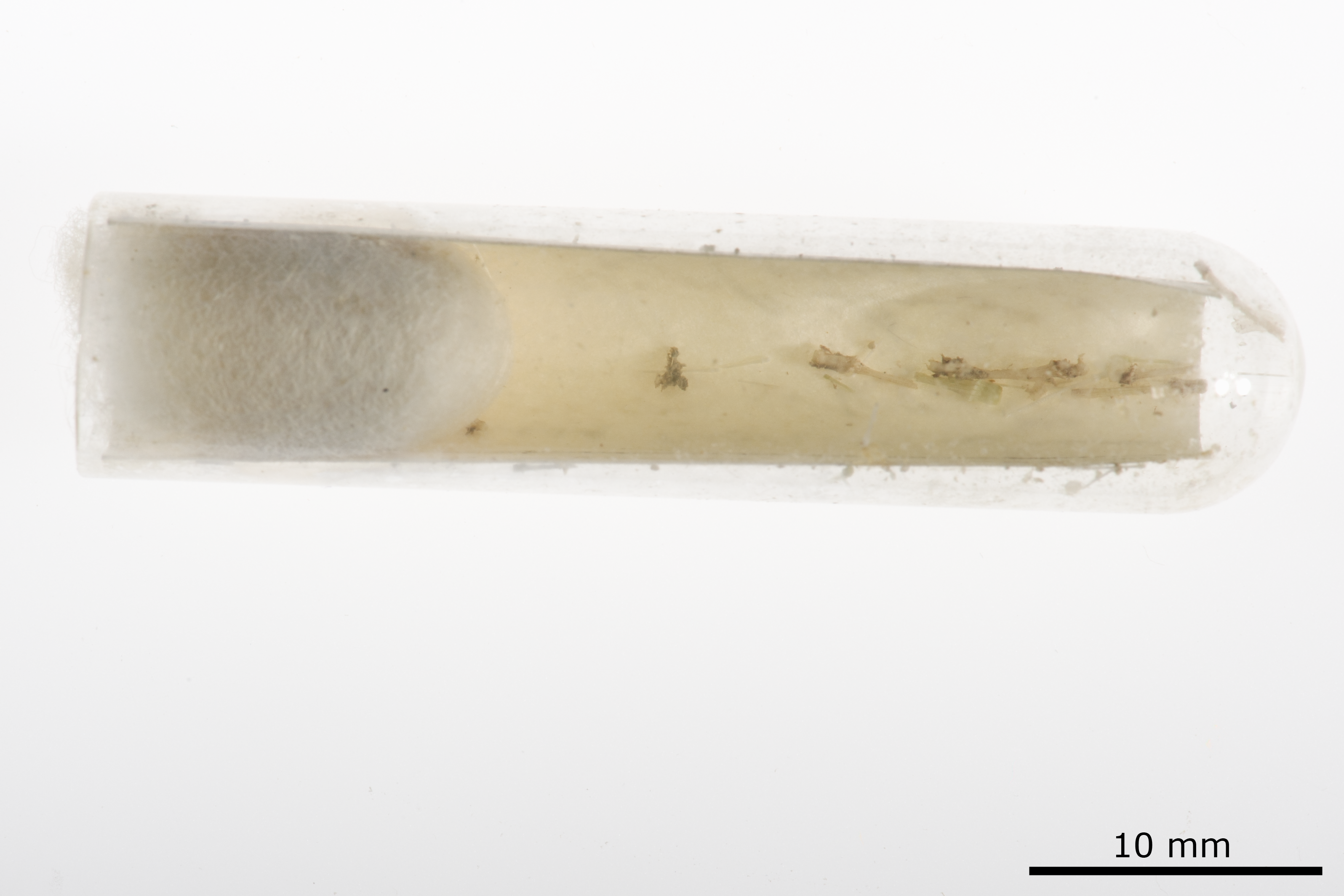
A fragment of the sea urchin.

Chaetodiadema tuberculatum is a species of sea urchins of the Family Diadematidae. Their armour is covered with spines. Chaetodiadema tuberculatum was first scientifically described in 1909 by Hubert Lyman Clark.

== See also ==
- Chaetodiadema keiense
- Chaetodiadema pallidum
- Chondrocidaris brevispina
