= Caenopedina indica =

Scientific classification
- Kingdom: Animalia
- Phylum: Echinodermata
- Class: Echinoidea
- Order: Pedinoida
- Family: Pedinidae
- Genus: Caenopedina
- Species: C. indica

Binomial name
- Caenopedina indica (de Meijere, 1903)

Species of sea urchin

Caenopedina indica is a species of sea urchins of the Family Pedinidae. Their armour is covered with spines. Caenopedina indica was first scientifically described in 1903 by de Meijere.
