= Caenopedina alanbakeri =

Scientific classification
- Kingdom: Animalia
- Phylum: Echinodermata
- Class: Echinoidea
- Order: Pedinoida
- Family: Pedinidae
- Genus: Caenopedina
- Species: C. alanbakeri

Binomial name
- Caenopedina alanbakeri (Rowe, 1989)

Species of sea urchin

Caenopedina alanbakeri is a species of sea urchins of the Family Pedinidae. Their armour is covered with spines. Caenopedina alanbakeri was first scientifically described in 1989 by Rowe.
