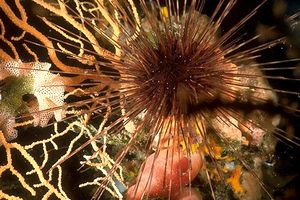

Scientific classification
- Domain: Eukaryota
- Kingdom: Animalia
- Phylum: Echinodermata
- Class: Echinoidea
- Order: Diadematoida
- Family: Diadematidae
- Genus: Centrostephanus
- Species: C. longispinus

Binomial name
- Centrostephanus longispinus (Philippi, 1845)

Subspecies
- Centrostephanus longispinus rubricingulus (Hubert Lyman Clark, 1921)

Synonyms
- Centrostephanus longispina (Philippi, 1845); Cidaris (Diadema) longispina Philippi, 1845; Diadema europaeum L. Agassiz & Desor, 1846; Diadema longispina Philippi, 1845

= Centrostephanus longispinus =

Species of sea urchin

Centrostephanus longispinus, the hatpin urchin, is a species of sea urchin in the family Diadematidae. There are two subspecies, Centrostephanus l. longispinus, found in the eastern Atlantic and Mediterranean Sea and Centrostephanus l. rubricingulus, found in the western Atlantic.

== Taxonomy ==
In 1940, Mortenson believed that C. longispinus and C. rubicingulus were closely related species but that they could be distinguished because C. longispinus has smaller and fewer secondary interambulacral tubercles. In 1975, Fell re-examined the genus but was unable to find sufficient differences to justify separating them into two species. He suggested that C. rubicingulus should be considered a sub-species of C. longispinus. Nor could he reliably distinguish the pair from C. besnardi except by the location from which they had been collected (C. besnardi is from the eastern Pacific). He was also unable to distinguish between juveniles of C. coronatus and juveniles of the other species.

== Description ==
Centrostephanus longispinus has a small central test and spines up to 30 centimetres (12 in) in length. These are toxic and can cause a painful sting. The spines are of varying length and are mobile and used for locomotion. There are a number of club-shaped spines on the oral (lower) surface, a characteristic that this species shares with C. besnardi and C. coronatus but not other members of the genus. These spines are reddish brown and are tipped with purple or pink pigment. The subspecies C. l. longispinus has spines banded in purple on a pale green, buff or whitish background. Juvenile C. l. rubricingulus have reddish-brown spines on a pale background while adults have either spines banded in brown on pale brown or uniformly dark-colored spines. It has been shown that C. longispinus has chromatophores (pigment bearing structures in cells) which are sensitive to light. By changing their shape, these alter the color of the animal, which is changed from a night-time black to a daytime greyish brown.

== Distribution and habitat ==
Centrostephanus longispinus occurs on the continental shelf on either side of the Atlantic Ocean. Its range extends from the Mediterranean Sea and North African coast to the Caribbean Sea and the Gulf of Mexico. The depth range is between 40 and 210 metres (130 and 690 ft). Off Florida this urchin is usually found on algae or on broken coral substrates, particularly the rubble remains of dead ivory bush coral (Oculina varicosa). It forms part of a species-rich community which includes other sea urchins, mollusks, polychaete worms, crabs and encrusting organisms. These sea urchins are not usually found on living reefs, perhaps because there is seldom macro-algae growing there or because predatory fish hiding among the coral heads consume the juvenile sea urchins.

== Biology ==
Examination of the contents of this urchin's stomach have shown that C. longispinus largely feeds on several species of red algae. At times of year when this is not available it probably eats small invertebrate prey. In the laboratory they will feed on the seagrass Thalassia testudinum and may attack the starfish Narcissia trigonaria if hungry enough.
