= Caenopedina porphyrogigas =

Scientific classification
- Kingdom: Animalia
- Phylum: Echinodermata
- Class: Echinoidea
- Order: Pedinoida
- Family: Pedinidae
- Genus: Caenopedina
- Species: C. porphyrogigas

Binomial name
- Caenopedina porphyrogigas (Anderson, 2009)

Species of sea urchin

Caenopedina porphyrogigas is a species of sea urchins of the Family Pedinidae. Their armour is covered with spines. Caenopedina porphyrogigas was first scientifically described in 2009 by Anderson.
