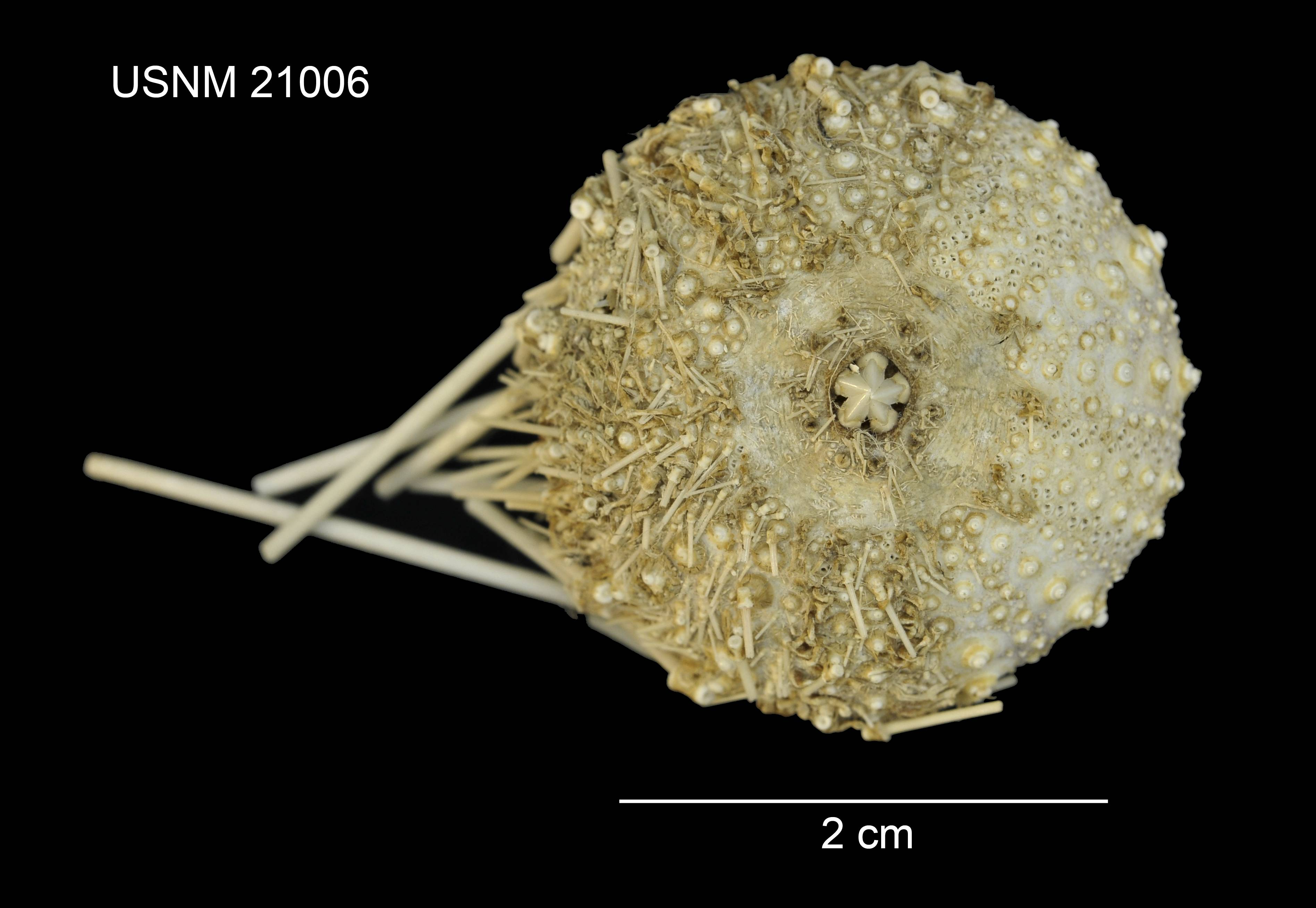

Scientific classification
- Kingdom: Animalia
- Phylum: Echinodermata
- Class: Echinoidea
- Order: Pedinoida
- Family: Pedinidae
- Genus: Caenopedina
- Species: C. diomedeae

Binomial name
- Caenopedina diomedeae (Mortensen, 1939)

= Caenopedina diomedeae =

Species of sea urchin

Caenopedina diomedeae is a species of sea urchins of the Family Pedinidae. Their armour is covered with spines. Caenopedina diomedeae was first scientifically described in 1939 by Ole Theodor Jensen Mortensen.
