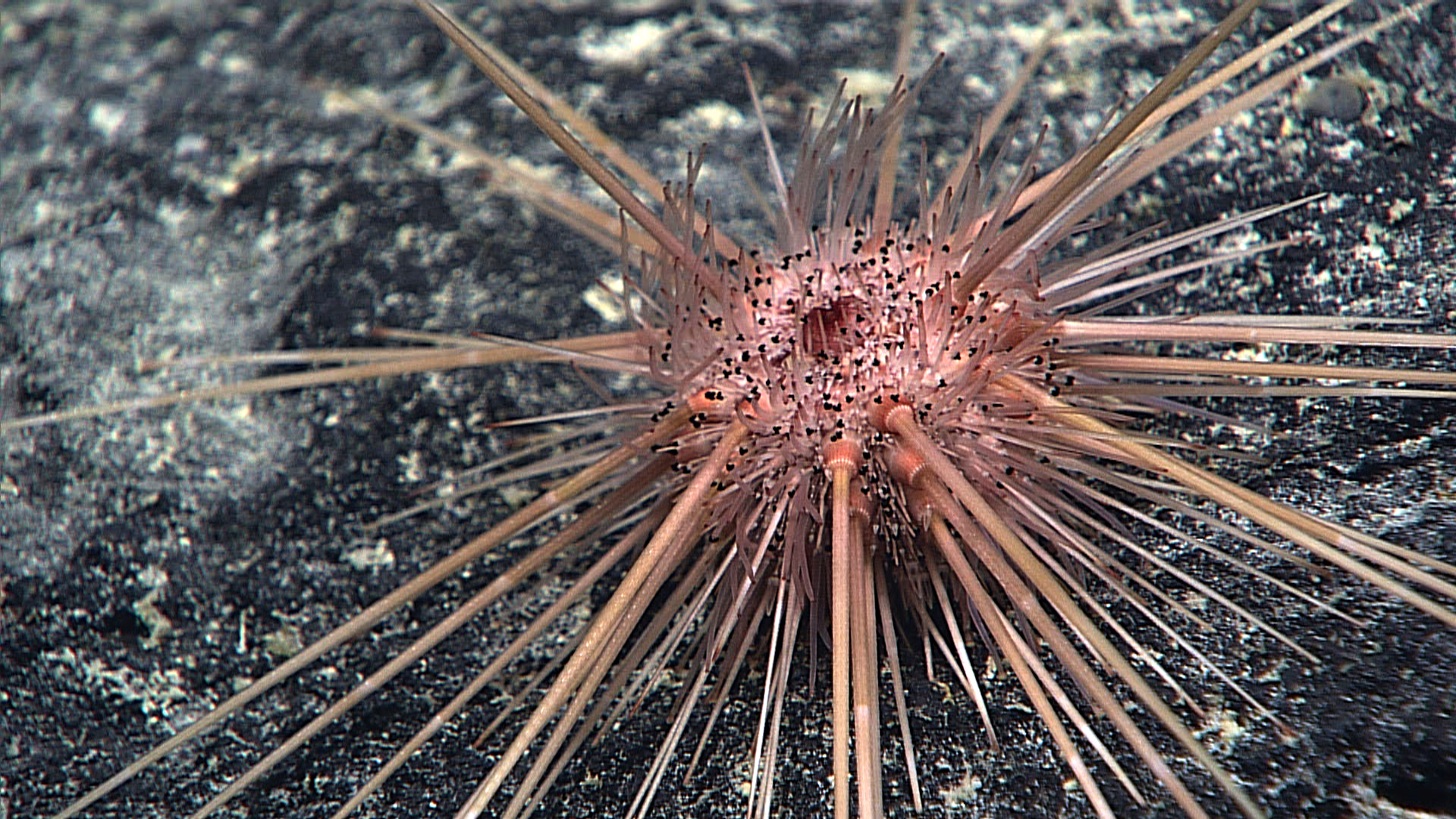
- Caenopedina cf. hawaiiensis seen off Hawaii by NOAAS Okeanos Explorer mission

Scientific classification
- Kingdom: Animalia
- Phylum: Echinodermata
- Class: Echinoidea
- Order: Pedinoida
- Family: Pedinidae
- Genus: Caenopedina
- Species: C. hawaiiensis

Binomial name
- Caenopedina hawaiiensis H.L. Clark, 1912

= Caenopedina hawaiiensis =

Species of sea urchin

Caenopedina hawaiiensis is a species of sea urchins of the Family Pedinidae. Their armor is covered with spines. Caenopedina hawaiiensis was first scientifically described in 1912 by Hubert Lyman Clark.
