= Caenopedina otagoensis =

Scientific classification
- Kingdom: Animalia
- Phylum: Echinodermata
- Class: Echinoidea
- Order: Pedinoida
- Family: Pedinidae
- Genus: Caenopedina
- Species: C. otagoensis

Binomial name
- Caenopedina otagoensis (McKnight, 1968)

Species of sea urchin

Caenopedina otagoensis is a species of sea urchins of the Family Pedinidae. Their armour is covered with spines. Caenopedina otagoensis was first scientifically described in 1968 by McKnight.
