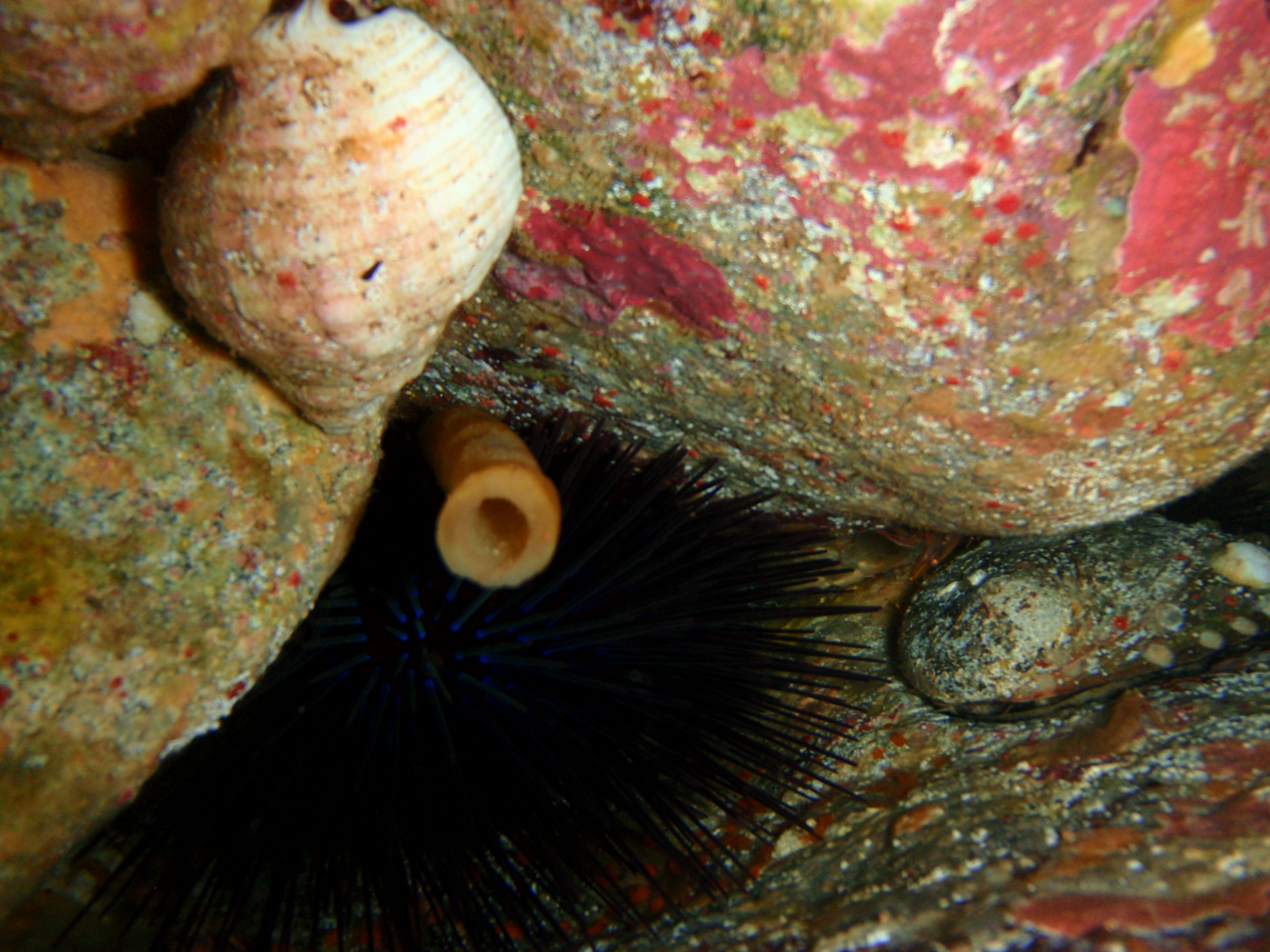
- Western hollow-spined urchin (Centrostephanus tenuispinus), cartrut shell (Dicathais orbita) and black lipped abalone (Haliotis rubra) at Greenly Island, South Australia

Scientific classification
- Kingdom: Animalia
- Phylum: Echinodermata
- Class: Echinoidea
- Order: Diadematoida
- Family: Diadematidae
- Genus: Centrostephanus
- Species: C. tenuispinus

Binomial name
- Centrostephanus tenuispinus Clark, 1914

= Centrostephanus tenuispinus =

Species of sea urchin

Centrostephanus tenuispinus is a species of sea urchin of the family Diadematidae. Their armour is covered with spines. Centrostephanus tenuispinus was first scientifically described in 1914 by Hubert Lyman Clark.

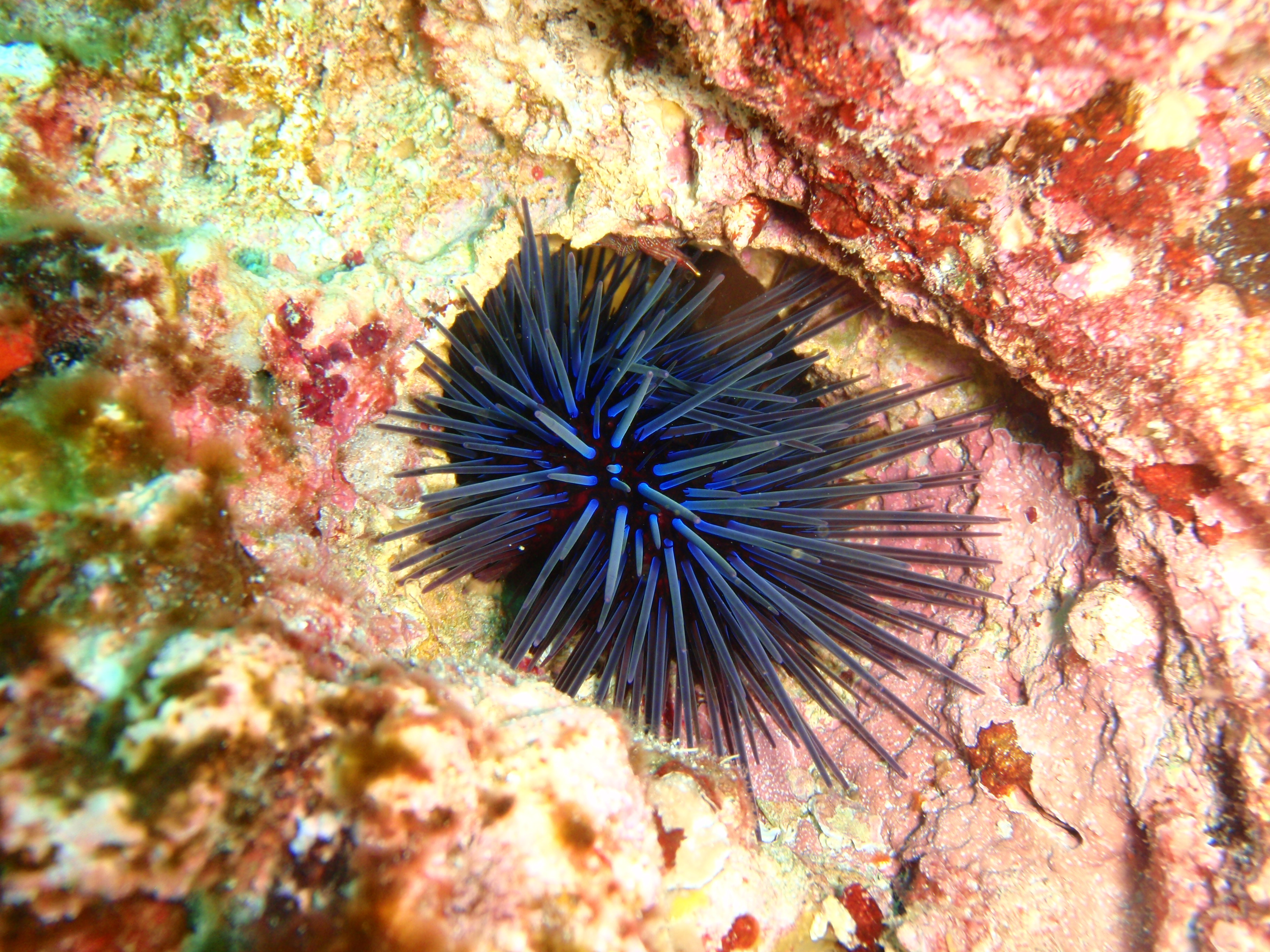
Centrostephanus tenuispinis
