= Chaetodiadema japonicum =

Scientific classification
- Kingdom: Animalia
- Phylum: Echinodermata
- Class: Echinoidea
- Order: Diadematoida
- Family: Diadematidae
- Genus: Chaetodiadema
- Species: C. japonicum

Binomial name
- Chaetodiadema japonicum (Mortensen, 1904)

Species of sea urchin

Chaetodiadema japonicum is a species of sea urchins of the Family Diadematidae. Their armor is covered with spines. Chaetodiadema japonicum was first scientifically described in 1904 by Ole Theodor Jensen Mortensen.

== See also ==
- Chaetodiadema africanum
- Chaetodiadema granulatum
- Chaetodiadema keiense
