= Chaetodiadema africanum =

Scientific classification
- Kingdom: Animalia
- Phylum: Echinodermata
- Class: Echinoidea
- Order: Diadematoida
- Family: Diadematidae
- Genus: Chaetodiadema
- Species: C. africanum

Binomial name
- Chaetodiadema africanum H.L. Clark, 1925

Species of sea urchin

Chaetodiadema africanum is a species of sea urchins of the Family Diadematidae. Their armour is covered with spines. Chaetodiadema africanum was first scientifically described in 1924 by Hubert Lyman Clark.

== See also ==
- Ceratophysa ceratopyga
- Ceratophysa rosea
- Chaetodiadema granulatum
