= Centrostephanus besnardi =

Scientific classification
- Kingdom: Animalia
- Phylum: Echinodermata
- Class: Echinoidea
- Order: Diadematoida
- Family: Diadematidae
- Genus: Centrostephanus
- Species: C. besnardi

Binomial name
- Centrostephanus besnardi Bernasconi, 1955

Species of sea urchin

Centrostephanus besnardi is a species of sea urchins of the family Diadematidae. Their armour is covered with spines. Centrostephanus besnardi was first scientifically described in 1955 by Bernasconi.
