= Astropyga nuptialis =

Scientific classification
- Kingdom: Animalia
- Phylum: Echinodermata
- Class: Echinoidea
- Order: Diadematoida
- Family: Diadematidae
- Genus: Astropyga
- Species: A. nuptialis

Binomial name
- Astropyga nuptialis (Tommasi, 1958)

Species of sea urchin

Astropyga nuptialis is a species of sea urchins of the family Diadematidae. Their armour is covered with spines. Astropyga nuptialis was first scientifically described in 1958 by Tommasi.
