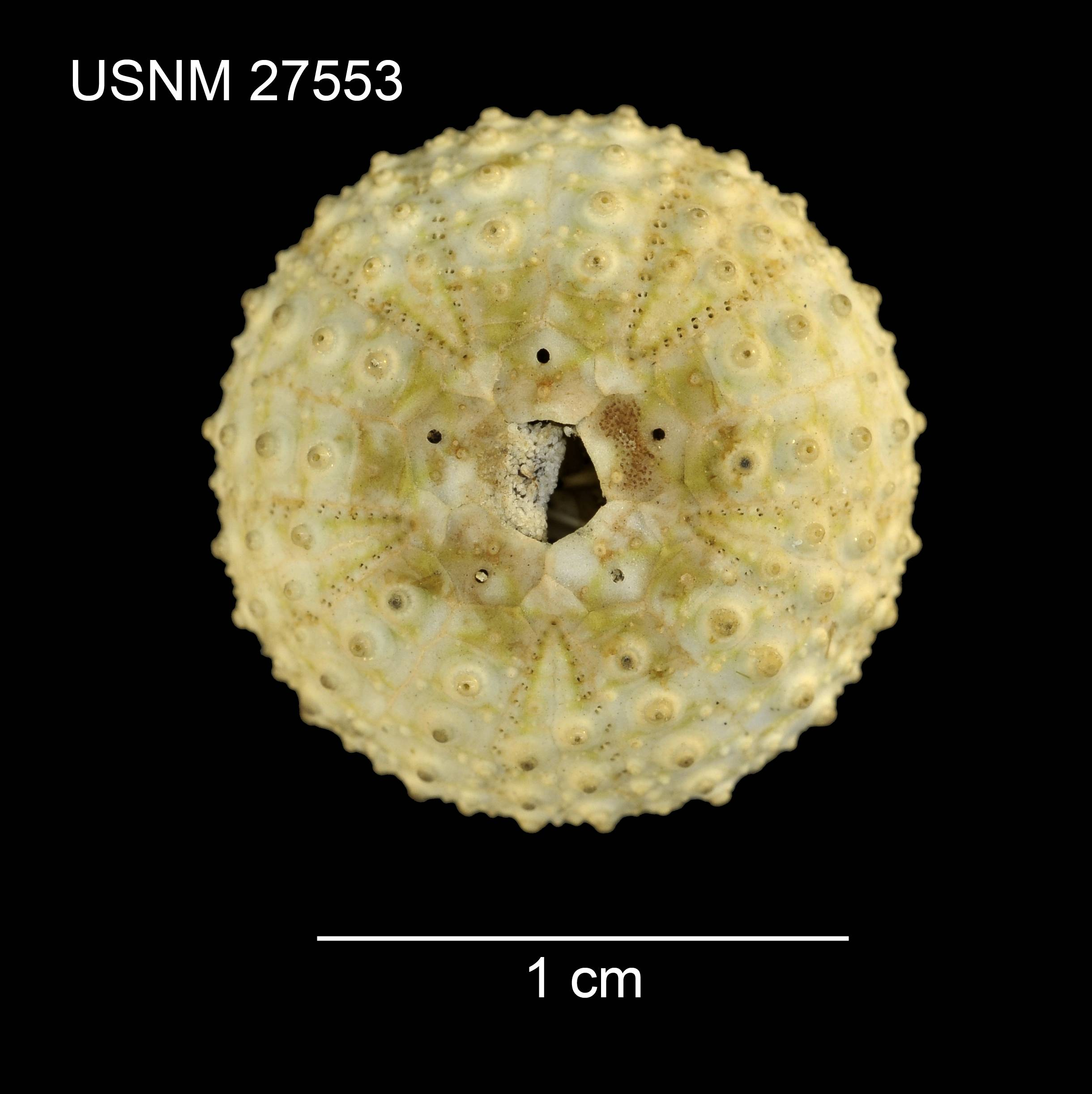

Scientific classification
- Kingdom: Animalia
- Phylum: Echinodermata
- Class: Echinoidea
- Order: Diadematoida
- Family: Diadematidae
- Genus: Centrostephanus
- Species: C. asteriscus

Binomial name
- Centrostephanus asteriscus Agassiz & Clark, 1907

= Centrostephanus asteriscus =

Species of sea urchin

Centrostephanus asteriscus is a species of sea urchin of the family Diadematidae. Their armour is covered with spines. Centrostephanus asteriscus was first scientifically described in 1907 by Alexander Emanuel Agassiz & Hubert Lyman Clark.
