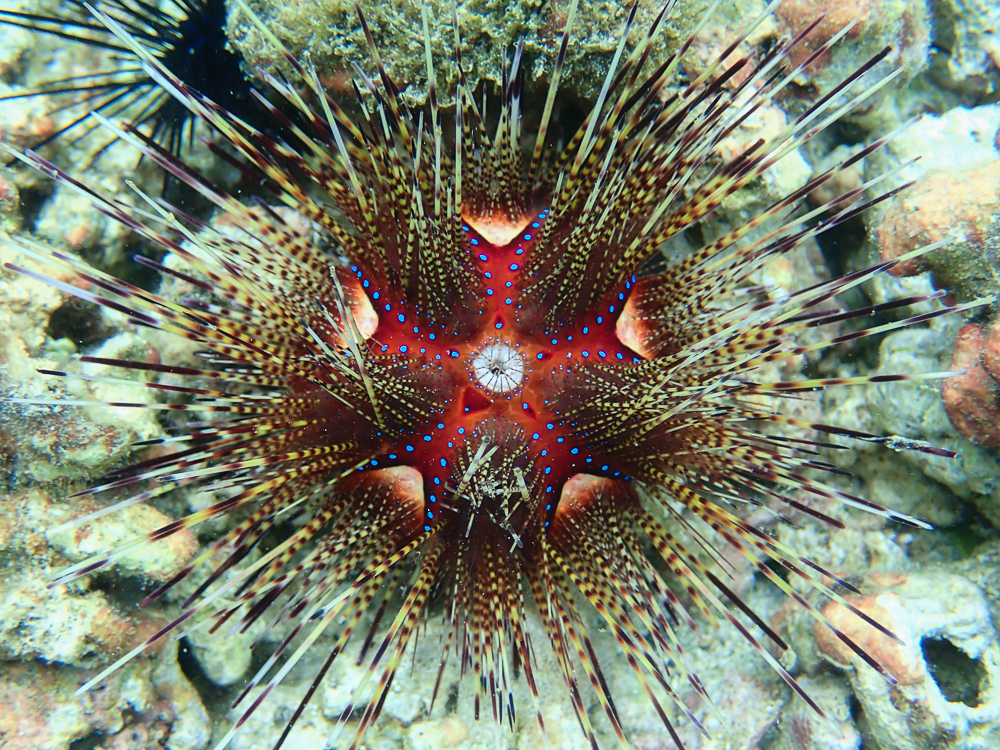

Scientific classification
- Kingdom: Animalia
- Phylum: Echinodermata
- Class: Echinoidea
- Order: Diadematoida
- Family: Diadematidae
- Genus: Astropyga
- Species: A. pulvinata

Binomial name
- Astropyga pulvinata (Lamarck, 1816)

= Astropyga pulvinata =

Species of sea urchin

Astropyga pulvinata is a species of sea urchins of the family Diadematidae. Their armour is covered with spines. Astropyga pulvinata was first scientifically described in 1816 by Jean-Baptiste de Lamarck.
