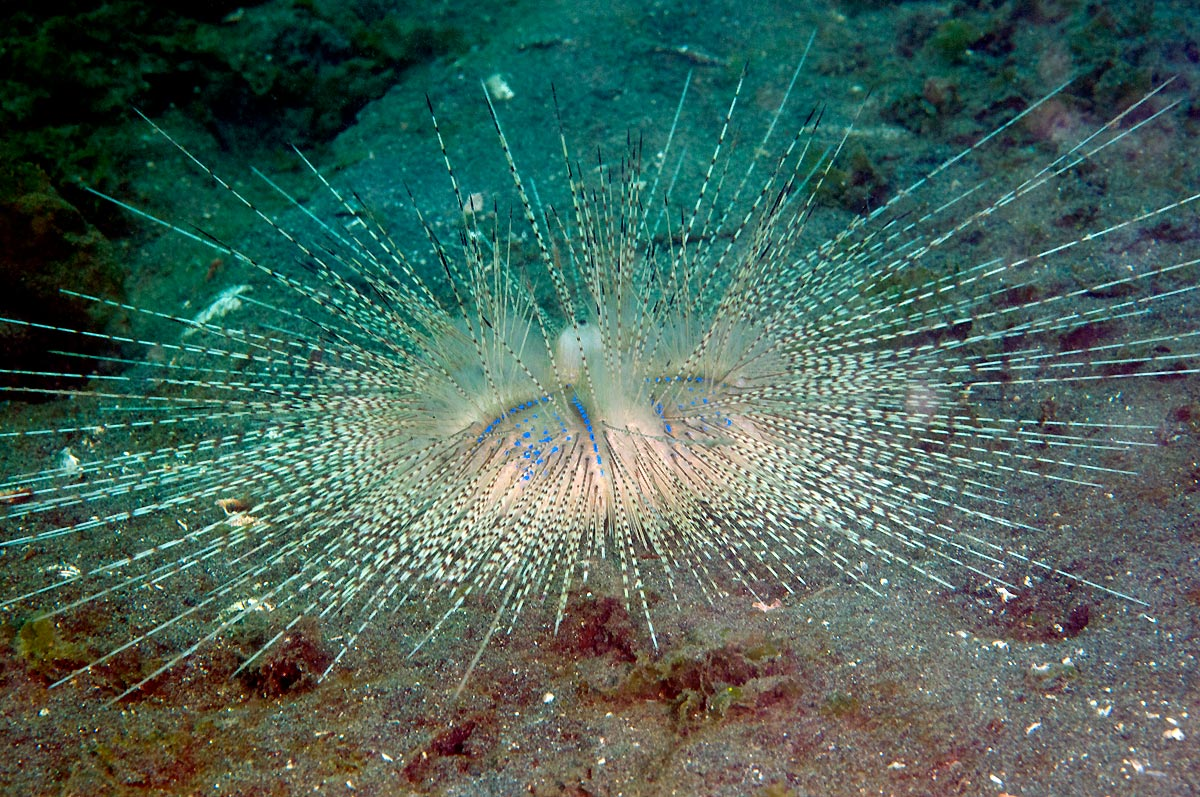
- Chaetodiadema granulatum

Scientific classification
- Kingdom: Animalia
- Phylum: Echinodermata
- Class: Echinoidea
- Order: Diadematoida
- Family: Diadematidae
- Genus: Chaetodiadema (Mortensen, 1903)

= Chaetodiadema =

Genus of sea urchins

Chaetodiadema is a genus of sea urchins of the Family Diadematidae. Their armour is covered with spines.

== List of species ==
Following World Register of Marine Species:

- Chaetodiadema africanum H.L. Clark, 1924 -- South Africa
- Chaetodiadema granulatum Mortensen, 1903 -- Indo-west Pacific
- Chaetodiadema japonicum Mortensen, 1904 -- Japan
- Chaetodiadema keiense Mortensen, 1939 -- Kei islands
- Chaetodiadema pallidum A. Agassiz & H.L. Clark, 1907 -- Hawaii
- Chaetodiadema tuberculatum H.L. Clark, 1909 -- South Australia
