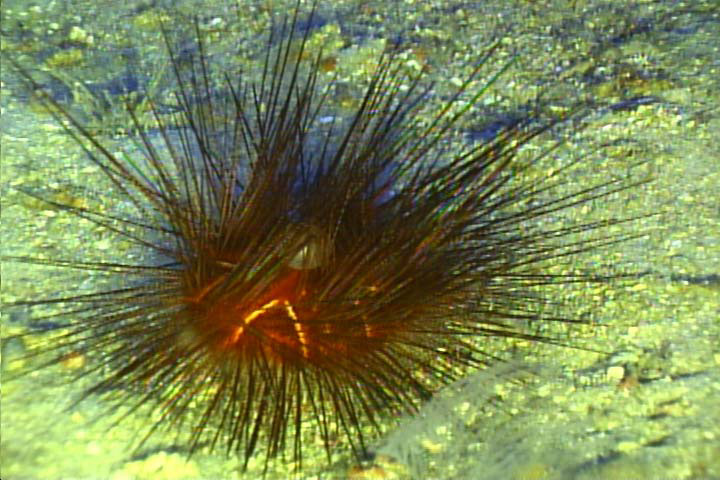

Conservation status
- Imperiled (NatureServe)

Scientific classification
- Kingdom: Animalia
- Phylum: Echinodermata
- Class: Echinoidea
- Order: Diadematoida
- Family: Diadematidae
- Genus: Astropyga
- Species: A. magnifica

Binomial name
- Astropyga magnifica (Clark, 1934)

= Astropyga magnifica =

Species of sea urchin

Astropyga magnifica is a species of sea urchin of the family Diadematidae. In life, their test is covered with spines. Astropyga magnifica was first scientifically described in 1934 by Austin Hobart Clark.

This Caribbean species is generally uncommon, and has been described as a 'deep water' species, occurring at or near recreational dive limits; this may limit the scarce information available about the species. However, it is also occasionally seen near shore, usually as single individuals. The species has also been observed in large, moving aggregations at intermediate depth (30–50 ft depth).

Magnificent Urchin aka Astropyga magnifica on Bonaire (Caribbean Netherlands) in Summer 2026.
