= Chaetodiadema keiense =

Scientific classification
- Kingdom: Animalia
- Phylum: Echinodermata
- Class: Echinoidea
- Order: Diadematoida
- Family: Diadematidae
- Genus: Chaetodiadema
- Species: C. keiense

Binomial name
- Chaetodiadema keiense (Mortensen, 1939)

Species of sea urchin

Chaetodiadema keiense is a species of sea urchins of the family, Diadematidae, their naming reflecting the fact that their armour is covered with spines. Chaetodiadema keiense was first scientifically described in 1939 by Ole Theodor Jensen Mortensen.

== See also ==
- Chaetodiadema granulatum
- Chaetodiadema japonicum
- Chaetodiadema pallidum
