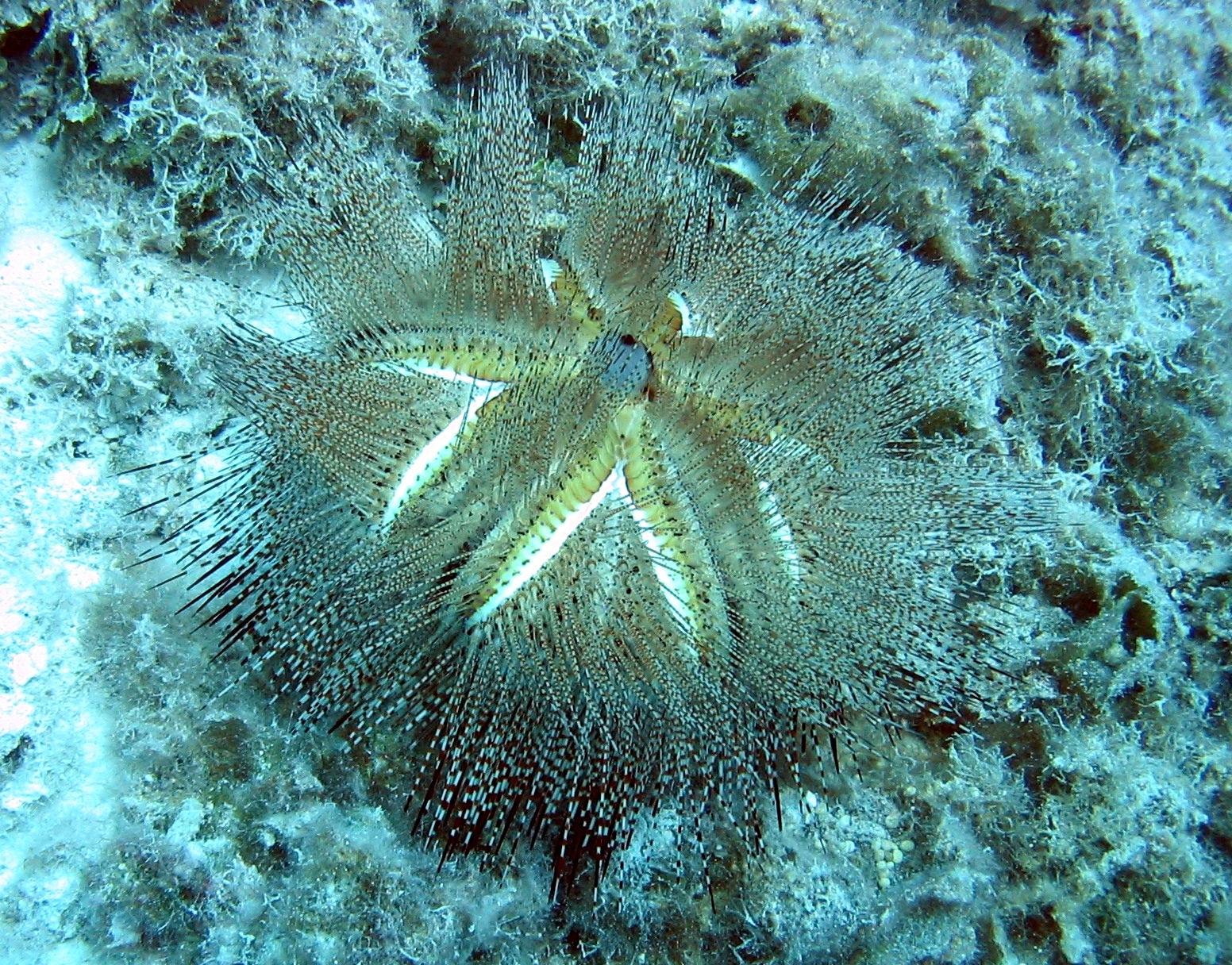
- Astropyga radiata

Scientific classification
- Kingdom: Animalia
- Phylum: Echinodermata
- Class: Echinoidea
- Order: Diadematoida
- Family: Diadematidae
- Genus: Astropyga; John Edward Gray, 1855

Species
- Astropyga magnifica; Astropyga nuptialis; Astropyga pulvinata; Astropyga radiata

= Astropyga =

Genus of sea urchins

Astropyga is a genus of sea urchins of the family Diadematidae. Their armour is covered with spines. Astropyga was first scientifically described in 1855 by John Edward Gray.

== Species ==
According to World Register of Marine Species:

Image	Scientific name	Distribution
	Astropyga magnifica (Leske, 1778)	Florida, U.S.A; Caribbean
	Astropyga nuptialis (Tommasi, 1958)	San Pablo, Brazil
	Astropyga pulvinata (Lamarck, 1816)	Eastern Pacific and Western Central Atlantic.
	Astropyga radiata (Leske, 1778)	tropical Indo-Pacific region.
