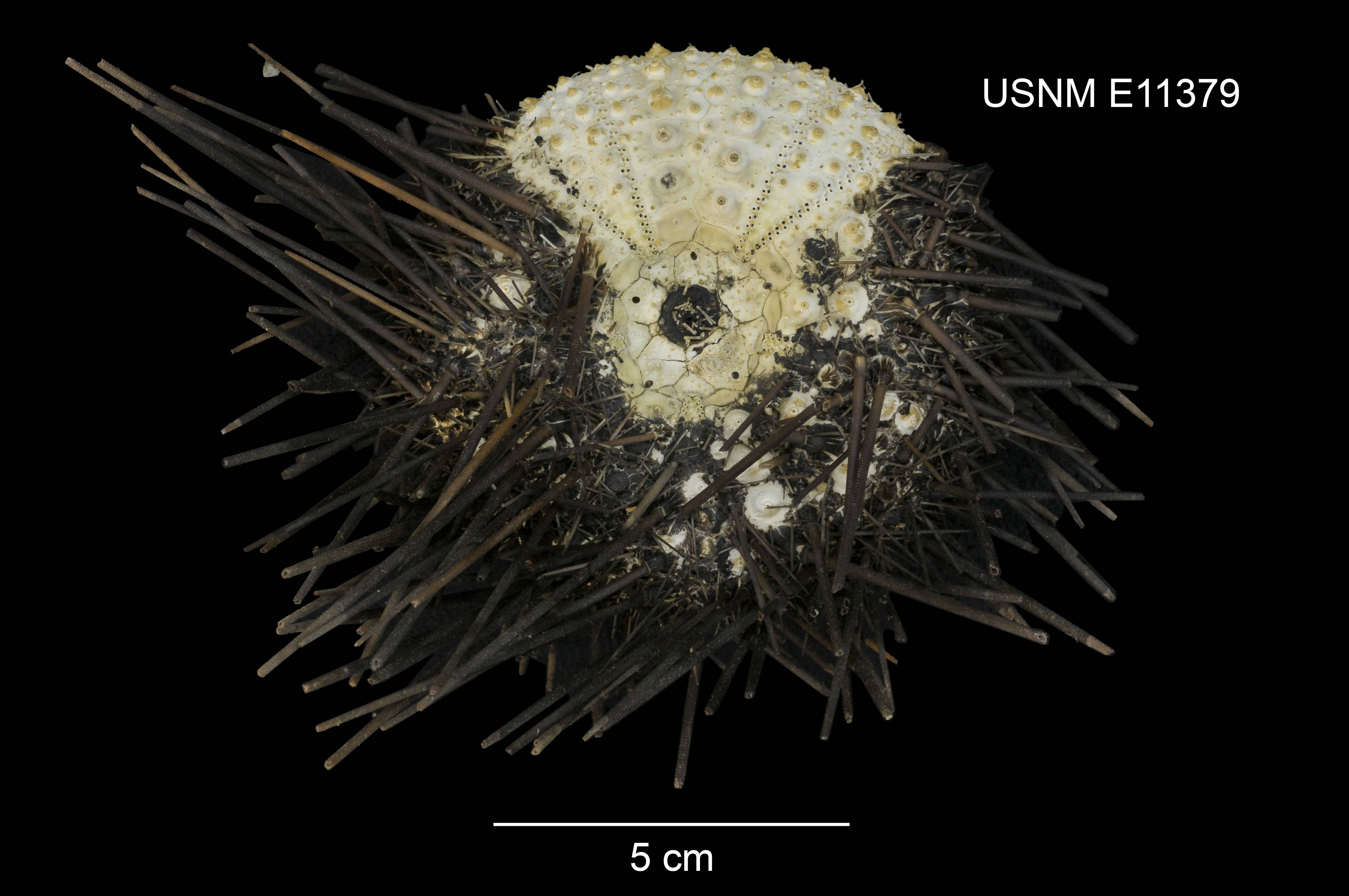

Scientific classification
- Kingdom: Animalia
- Phylum: Echinodermata
- Class: Echinoidea
- Order: Diadematoida
- Family: Diadematidae
- Genus: Centrostephanus
- Species: C. sylviae

Binomial name
- Centrostephanus sylviae Koehler, 1975

= Centrostephanus sylviae =

Species of sea urchin

Centrostephanus sylviae is a species of sea urchins of the family Diadematidae. Their armour is covered with spines. Centrostephanus sylviae was first scientifically described in 1975 by Koehler.
