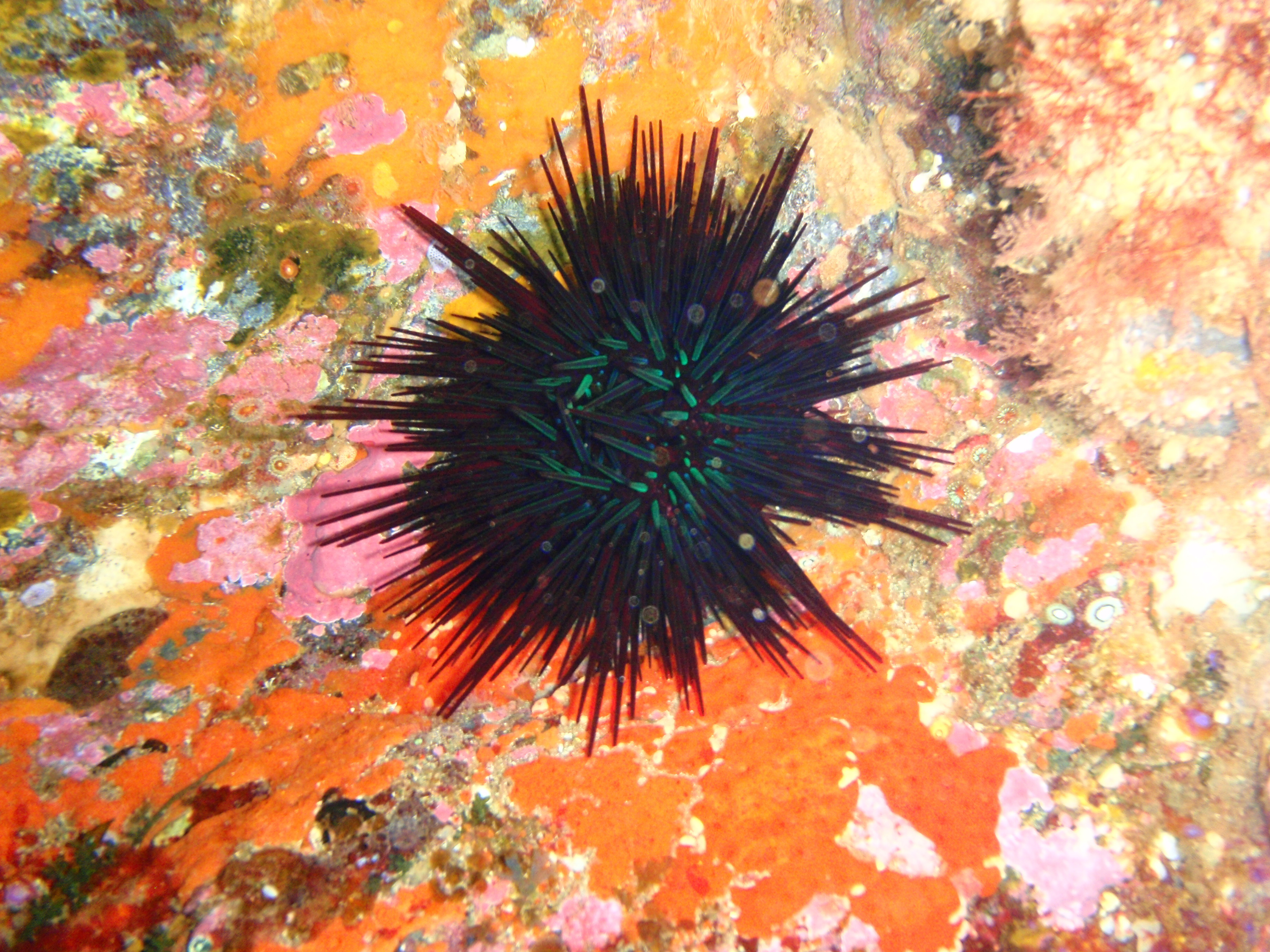

Scientific classification
- Kingdom: Animalia
- Phylum: Echinodermata
- Class: Echinoidea
- Order: Diadematoida
- Family: Diadematidae
- Genus: Centrostephanus
- Species: C. rodgersii

Binomial name
- Centrostephanus rodgersii (A. Agassiz, 1864)

= Centrostephanus rodgersii =

Species of sea urchin

Centrostephanus rodgersii, commonly known as the long-spined sea urchin, is a species of sea urchin of the family Diadematidae.

== Description ==
It is a big, dark-purple sea urchin, with long and slender spines, reflecting a green tinge in the light. The shell can be reddish.

== Distribution and habitat ==
This sea urchin is found in north-eastern New Zealand and south-east Australia. It was first recorded in New Zealand in 1897 from a specimen held in the Colonial Museum and is considered to be native to that country.

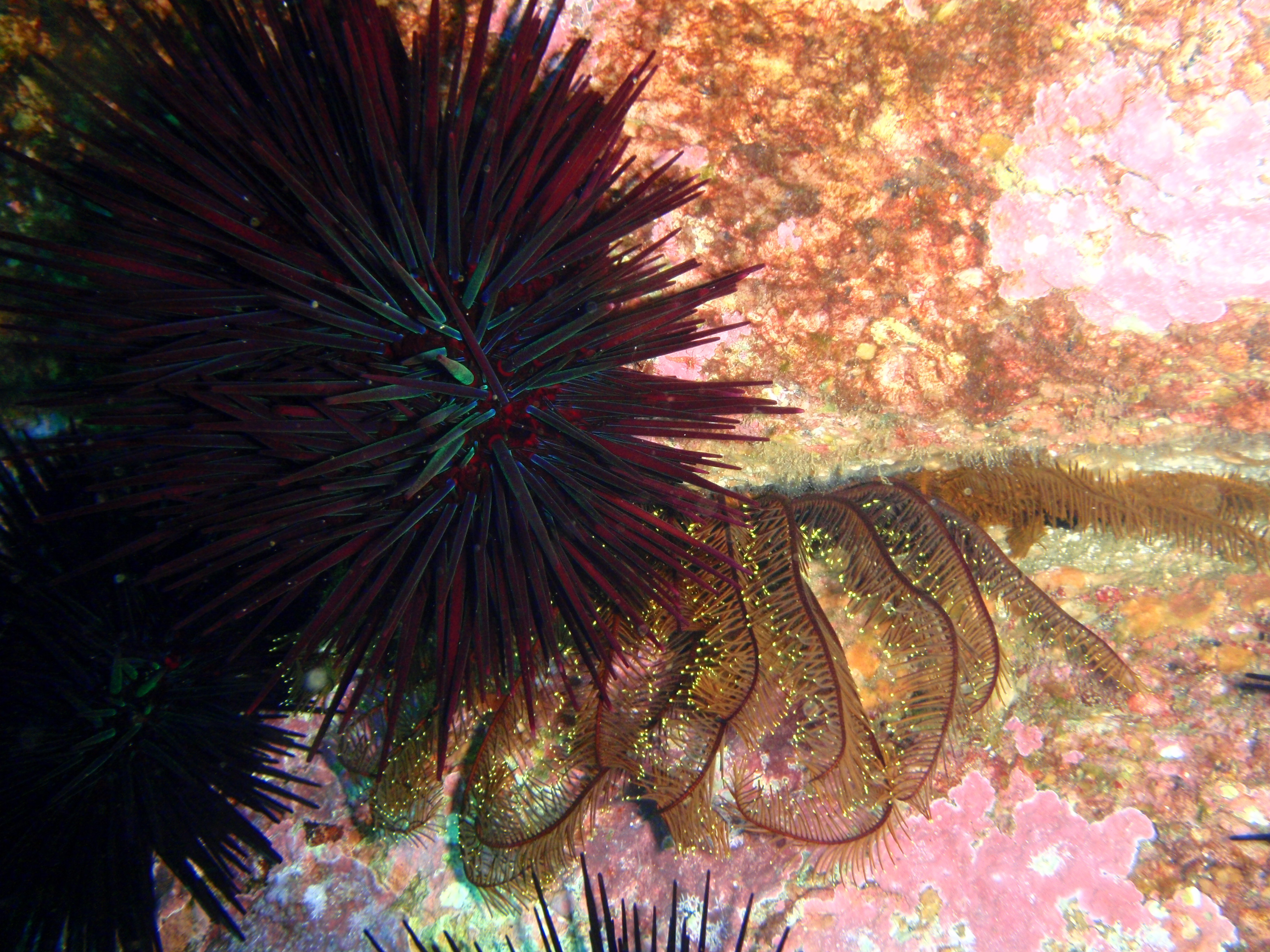

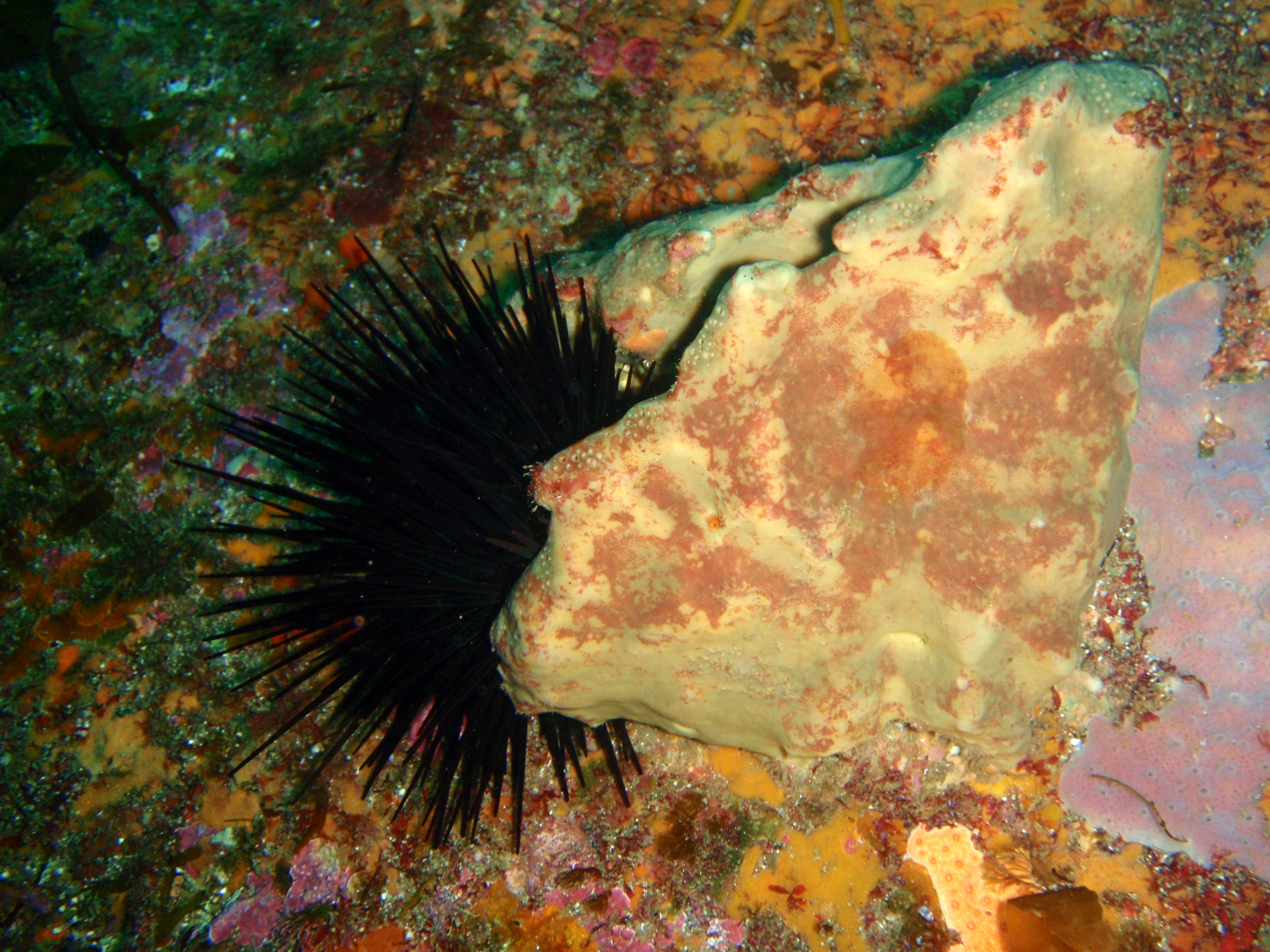

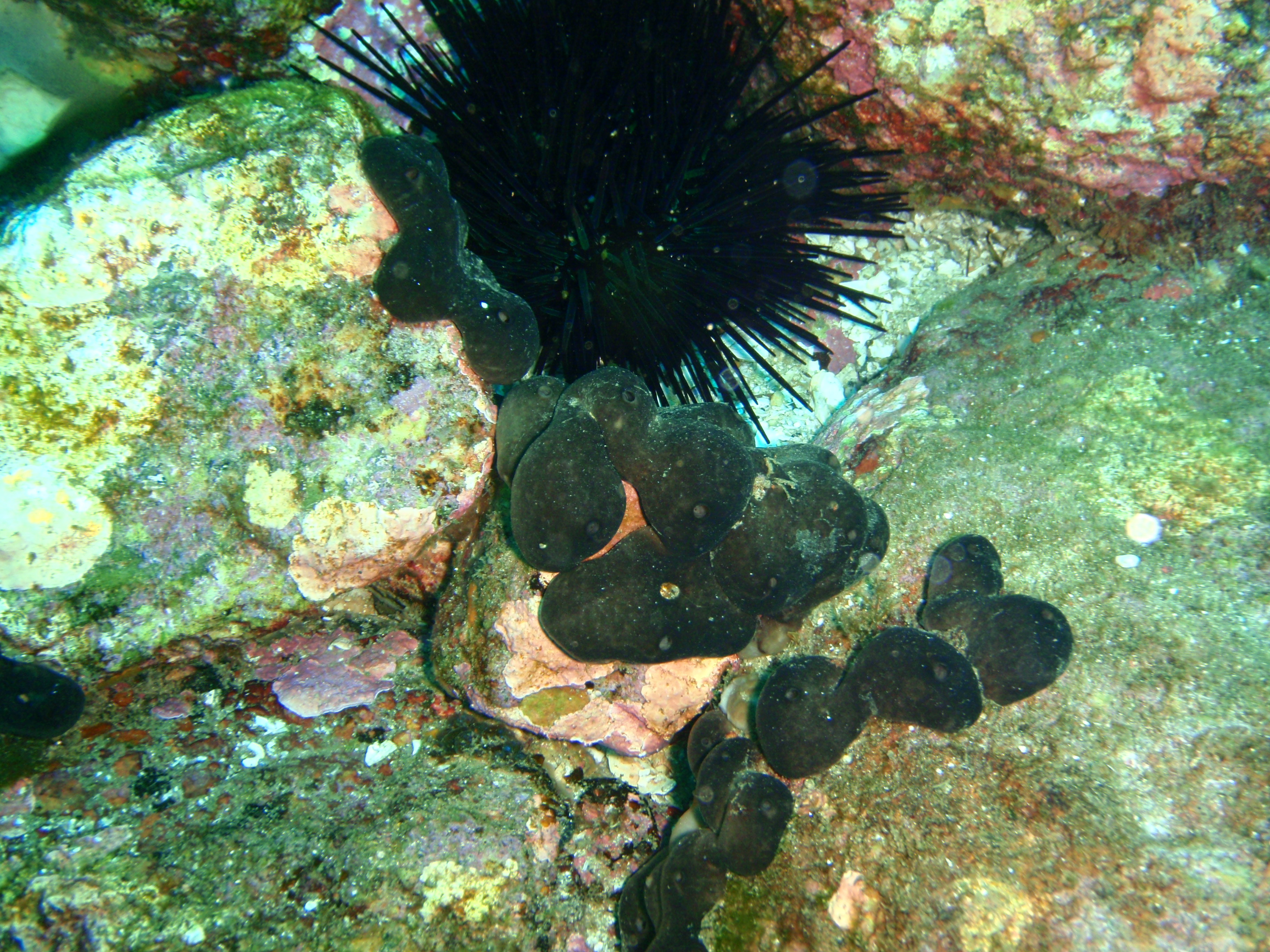

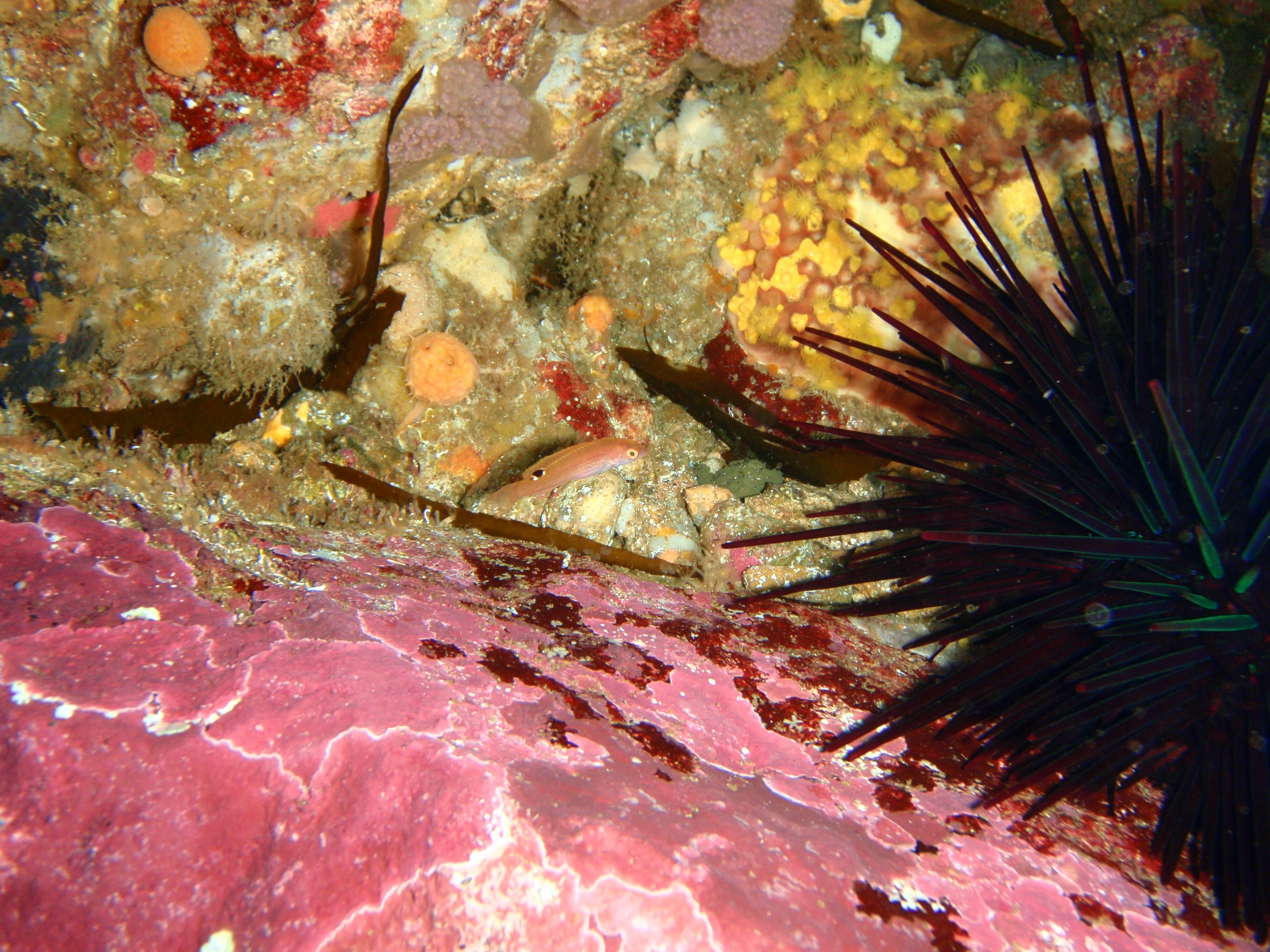
