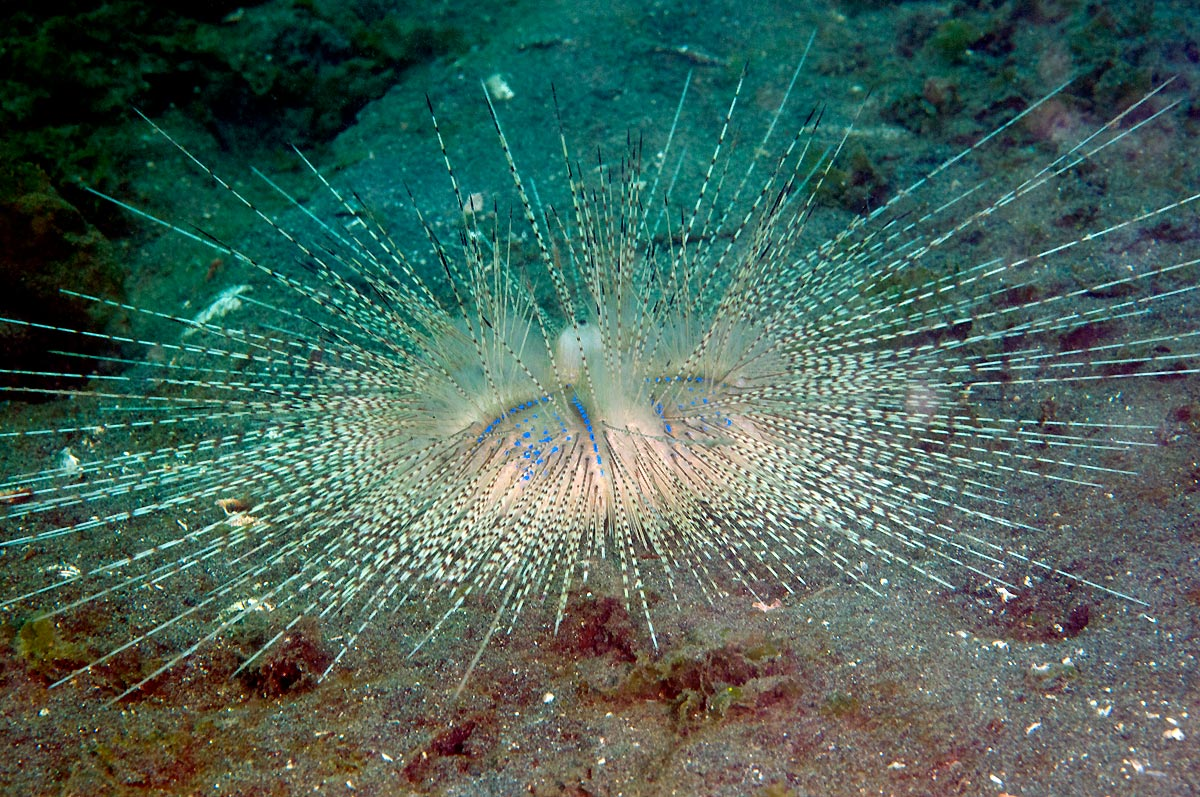
- Chaetodiadema granulatum in Bali.

Scientific classification
- Kingdom: Animalia
- Phylum: Echinodermata
- Class: Echinoidea
- Order: Diadematoida
- Family: Diadematidae
- Genus: Chaetodiadema
- Species: C. granulatum

Binomial name
- Chaetodiadema granulatum (Mortensen, 1903)

= Chaetodiadema granulatum =

Species of sea urchin

Chaetodiadema granulatum is a species of sea urchins of the Family Diadematidae. Their armour is covered with long and slender spines, and the test is quite flattened.

Chaetodiadema granulatum was first scientifically described in 1903 by Ole Theodor Jensen Mortensen.

== See also ==
- Ceratophysa rosea
- Chaetodiadema africanum
- Chaetodiadema japonicum
