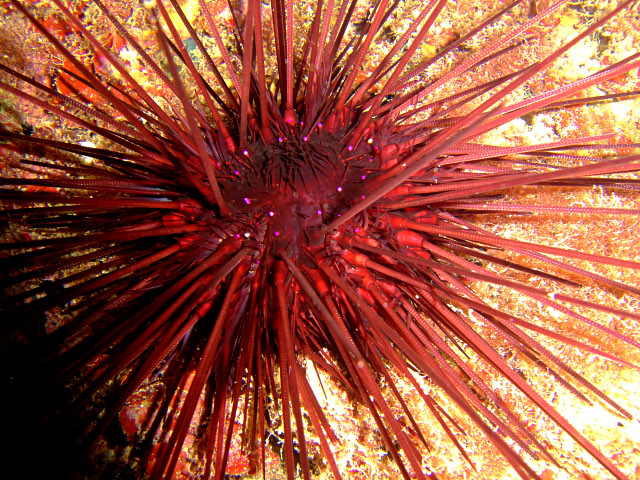
- Centrostephanus longispinus

Scientific classification
- Kingdom: Animalia
- Phylum: Echinodermata
- Class: Echinoidea
- Order: Diadematoida
- Family: Diadematidae
- Genus: Centrostephanus; Peters, 1855

= Centrostephanus =

Genus of sea urchins

Centrostephanus is a genus of echinoderms belonging to the family Diadematidae.

The genus has almost cosmopolitan distribution.

Species:

Image	Scientific name	Distribution
	Centrostephanus asteriscus Agassiz & Clark, 1907	North Pacific Ocean
	Centrostephanus besnardi Bernasconi, 1955	Brazil
	Centrostephanus coronatus (Verrill, 1867)	eastern Pacific Ocean from Monterey Bay, California to Peru, including the Gulf of California
	Centrostephanus habanensis Lambert, 1925	Cuba
	Centrostephanus longispinus (Philippi, 1845)	Atlantic and Mediterranean Sea
	Centrostephanus nitidus Koehler, 1927	Indian Ocean
	Centrostephanus rodgersii (Agassiz, 1864)	New Zealand and south-east Australia.
	Centrostephanus sylviae Fell, 1975	Chile
	Centrostephanus tenuispinus Clark, 1914	Australia

== Fossils ==
- † Centrostephanus sacyi Lambert, 1928
