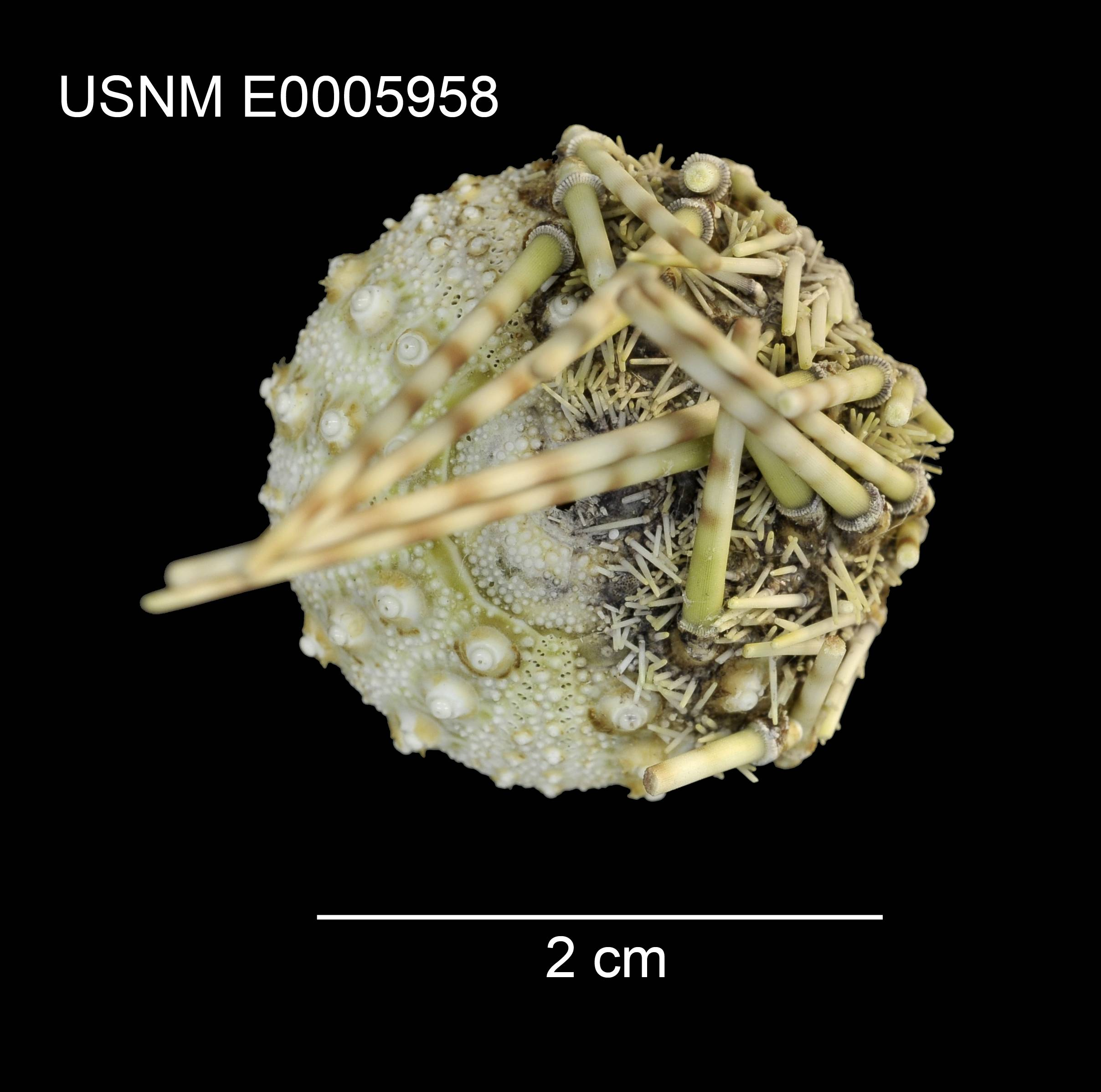
- Caenopedina annulata

Scientific classification
- Kingdom: Animalia
- Phylum: Echinodermata
- Class: Echinoidea
- Order: Pedinoida
- Family: Pedinidae
- Genus: Caenopedina; A. Agassiz, 1869

Synonyms
- Coenodiadema (misspelling); Coenopedina (misspelling); Miopedina Pomel, 1883 (subjective junior synonym); Stereopedina de Loriol, 1903 † (subjective junior synonym)

= Caenopedina =

Genus of sea urchins

Caenopedina is a genus of sea urchins of the family Pedinidae.

== Species ==
Species accepted within Caenopedina:

- Caenopedina alanbakeri Rowe, 1989
- Caenopedina annulata Mortensen, 1940
- Caenopedina capensis H.L. Clark, 1923
- Caenopedina cubensis A. Agassiz, 1869
- Caenopedina diomedeae Mortensen, 1939
- Caenopedina hawaiiensis H.L. Clark, 1912
- Caenopedina indica (de Meijere, 1903)
- Caenopedina mirabilis (Döderlein, 1885)
- Caenopedina novaezealandiae Pawson, 1964
- Caenopedina otagoensis McKnight, 1968
- Caenopedina porphyrogigas Anderson, 2009
- Caenopedina pulchella (A. Agassiz & H.L. Clark, 1907)
- Caenopedina superba H.L. Clark, 1925
