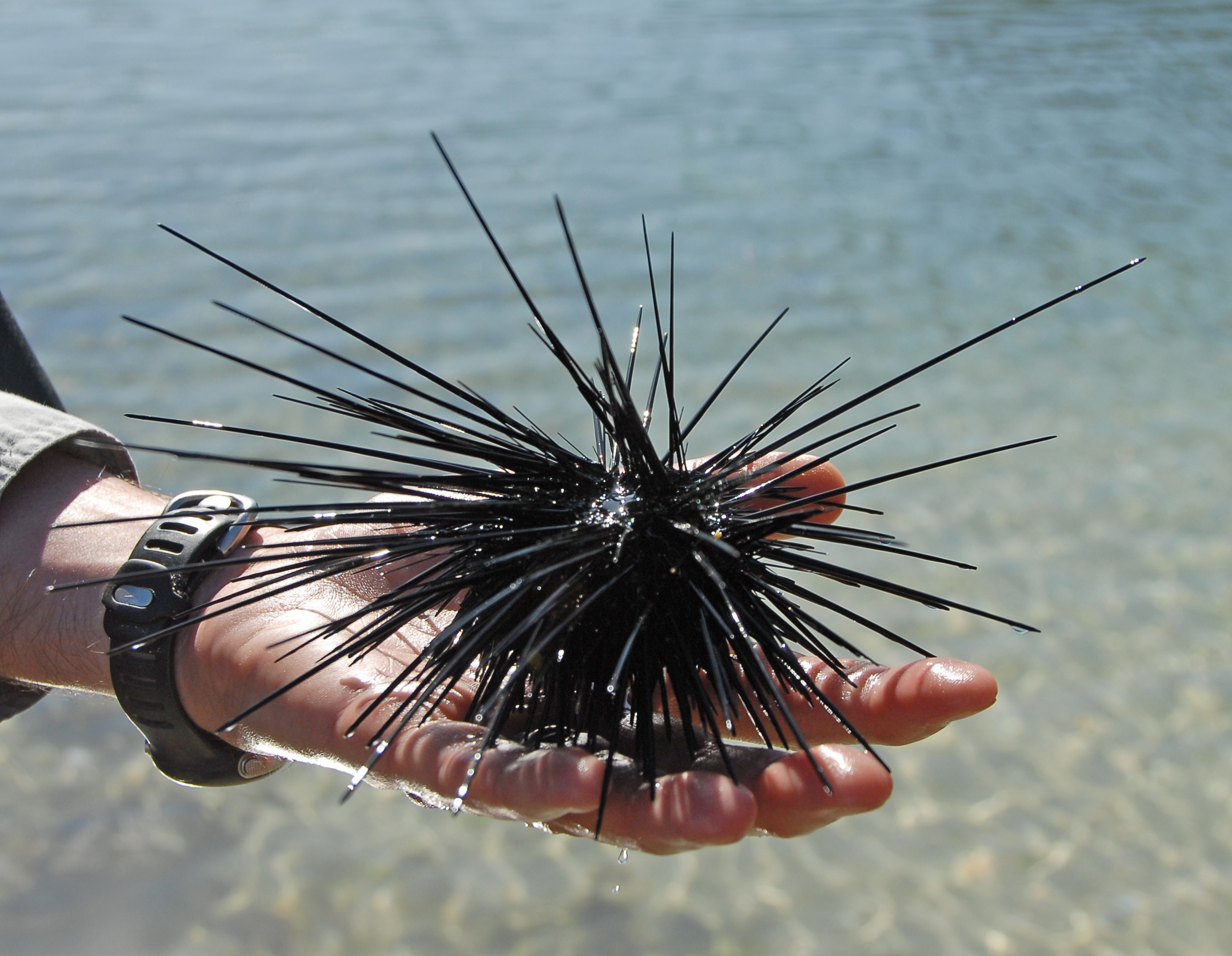
- Centrostephanus coronatus adult
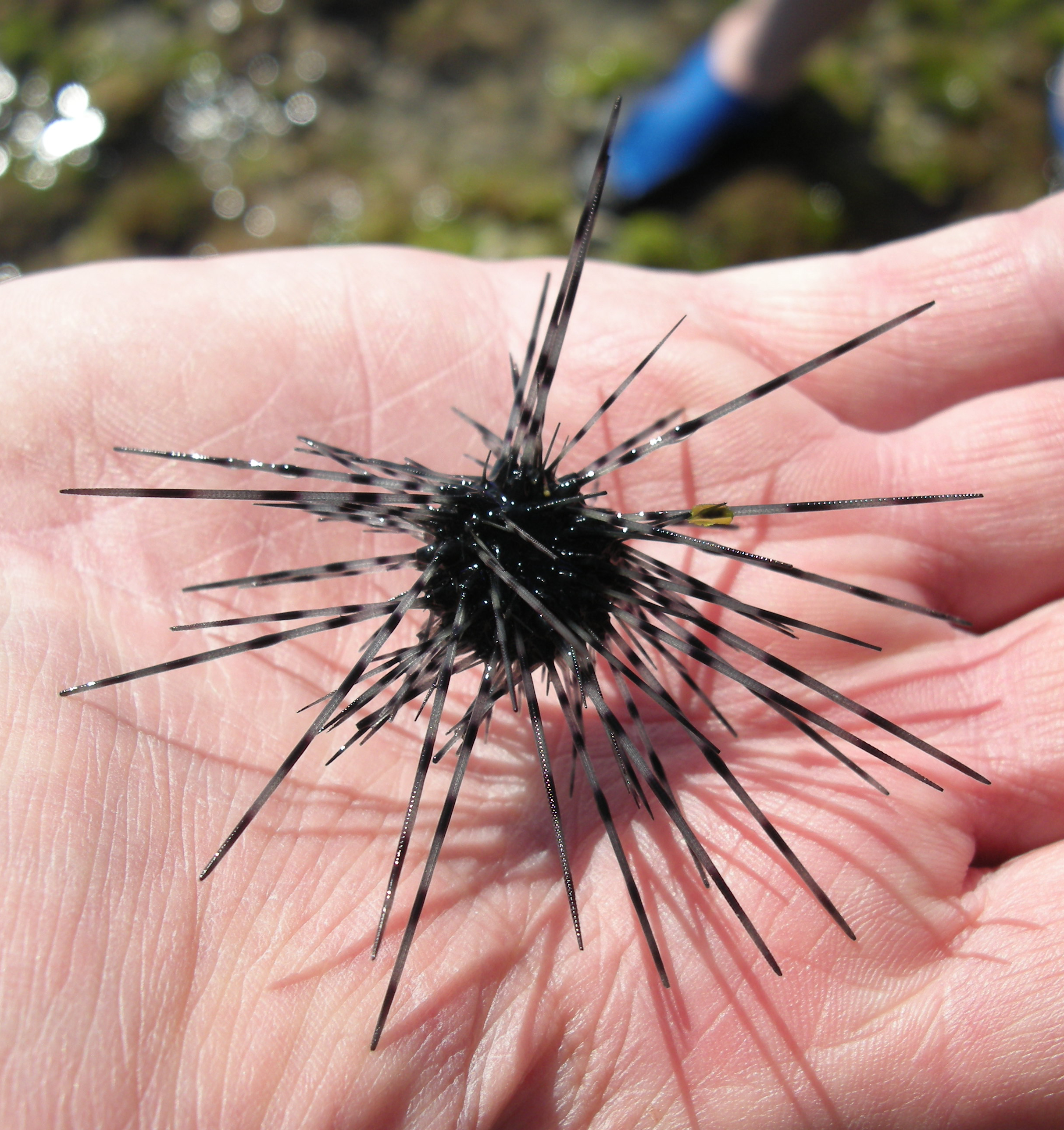
- Centrostephanus coronatus juvenile

Scientific classification
- Kingdom: Animalia
- Phylum: Echinodermata
- Class: Echinoidea
- Order: Diadematoida
- Family: Diadematidae
- Genus: Centrostephanus
- Species: C. coronatus

Binomial name
- Centrostephanus coronatus (Verrill, 1867)

Synonyms
- Echinodiadema coronata Verrill, 1867

= Centrostephanus coronatus =

Species of sea urchin

Centrostephanus coronatus, also known as crowned sea urchin, is a species of sea urchin in the family Diadematidae. It was first described to science by Yale zoology Professor Addison Emery Verrill in 1867.

== Description ==
The adults are all black, with some blue at the base of the spines. Juveniles have gray bands on their spines. The test is 32 millimetres (1.3 in) to 63 millimetres (2.5 in) in diameter. The spines are thin, hollow, brittle, and very sharp. The longest spines can be 125 millimetres (4.9 in) long. Five clusters of smaller spines surround the mouth on the underside of the test.

== Distribution ==
Crowned sea urchins are found in the eastern Pacific Ocean from Monterey Bay, California to Peru, including the Gulf of California. The species has expanded its range north in recent years. They are also found in the Galapagos Islands. They live from the low-tide line to 125 metres (410 ft) deep. These are bottom dwellers, favoring rocky substrates and reefs.

== Life history ==
This urchin seeks holes and crevices in the bottom when resting. The rock protects them from predators on all sides except the opening of the hole, and the spines guard that. When an individual finds an especially good fitting hole, it can brace its spines against the sides of the rock to resist being pulled out of its niche.

Crowned sea urchins are nocturnal, foraging within a few meters of their shelters, to which they return at dawn. They are mostly carnivorous, feeding on sponges, tunicates, bryozoans, and algae.

Crowned sea urchins are gonochoric, which is to say that there are two sexes, and each individual is either male or female. Spawning takes place on a monthly cycle that may be tied to tidal rhythms.
