= Centrostephanus nitidus =

Scientific classification
- Kingdom: Animalia
- Phylum: Echinodermata
- Class: Echinoidea
- Order: Diadematoida
- Family: Diadematidae
- Genus: Centrostephanus
- Species: C. nitidus

Binomial name
- Centrostephanus nitidus Koehler, 1927

Species of sea urchin

Centrostephanus nitidus is a species of sea urchin of the family Diadematidae. Their armour is covered with spines. Centrostephanus nitidus was first scientifically described in 1927 by Koehler.
