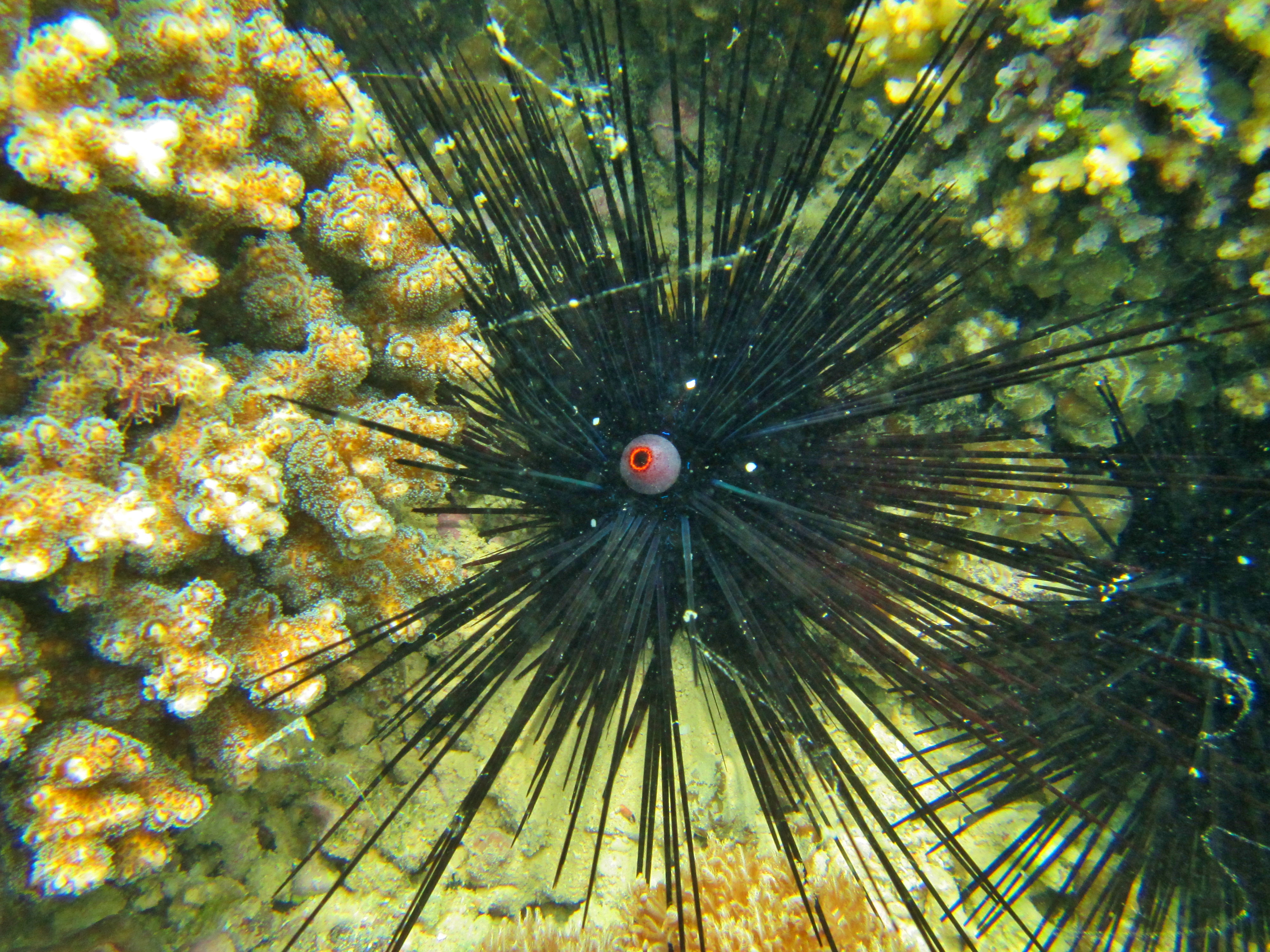
- Diadema setosum in Oman.

Scientific classification
- Kingdom: Animalia
- Phylum: Echinodermata
- Class: Echinoidea
- Order: Diadematoida
- Family: Diadematidae; Gray, 1855

= Diadematidae =

Family of sea urchins

The Diadematidae are a family of sea urchins. Their tests are either rigid or flexible and their spines are long and hollow.

- Astropyga Gray, 1825
  - Astropyga radiata (Leske, 1778), extant
  - Astropyga pulvinata (Lamarck, 1816), extant
  - Astropyga magnifica (Clark, 1934), extant
- Centrostephanus Peters, 1855
  - Centrostephanus asteriscus (Agassiz & Clark, 1907), extant
  - Centrostephanus coronatus (Verrill, 1867), extant
  - Centrostephanus fragile (Wiltshire in Wright, 1882), Santonian, Maastrichtian, Danian
  - Centrostephanus longispinus (Philippi, 1845), extant
  - Centrostephanus nitidus (Koehler, 1927), extant
  - Centrostephanus rodgersii (Agassiz, 1863), extant
- Chaetodiadema Mortensen, 1903
  - Chaetodiadema granulatum (Mortensen, 1903), extant
  - Chaetodiadema keiense (Mortensen, 1903), extant
  - Chaetodiadema tuberculatum (Clark, 1909), extant
- Diadema Gray, 1825
  - Diadema palmeri (Baker, 1967), extant
  - Diadema savignyi (Audouin, 1829), extant
  - Diadema setosum (Leske, 1778), extant
  - Diadema antillarum (Philippi, 1845), extant
  - Diadema paucispinum (Agassiz, 1863), extant
  - Diadema mexicanum (Agassiz, 1863), extant
  - Diadema ascensionis (Mortensen, 1909), extant
- Echinodiadema Verrill, 1867
  - Echinodiadema coronata (Verrill, 1867), extant
- Echinothrix Peters, 1853
  - Echinothrix calamaris (Pallas, 1774), extant
  - Echinothrix diadema (Linnaeus, 1758), extant
- Eodiadema, Lower Jurassic
- Eremopyga Agassiz & Clark, 1908
  - Eremopyga denudata (De Meijere, 1904), extant
- Goniodiadema Mortensen, 1939
  - Goniodiadema mauritiense (Mortensen, 1939), extant
- Kamptosoma Mortensen, 1903, extant
- Palaeodiadema (Pomel, 1887), Santonian, Maastrichtian, Danian
- Pedinothuria Louis, 1897
  - Pedinothuria cidaroides (Gregory, 1897), Callovian, Oxfordian

== Senses ==
Like other sea urchins diadematids are sensitive to touch, light, and chemicals; additionally they do have eyes (eye spots) which is in contrast to other sea urchins. Because of this they can follow a threat with their spines.

== Images ==
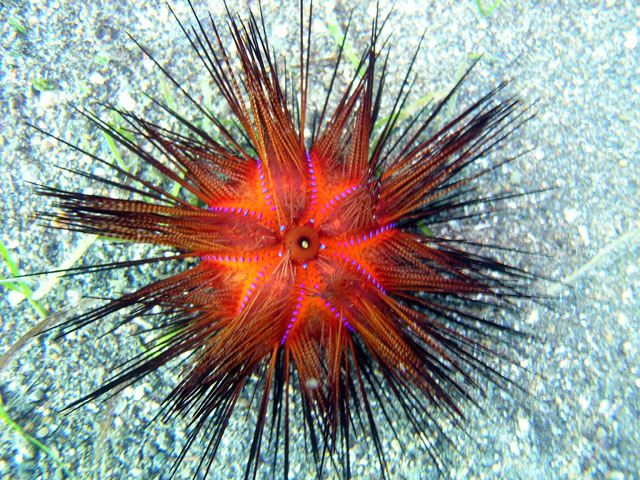
Astropyga radiata.

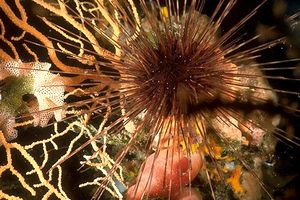
Centrostephanus longispinus.

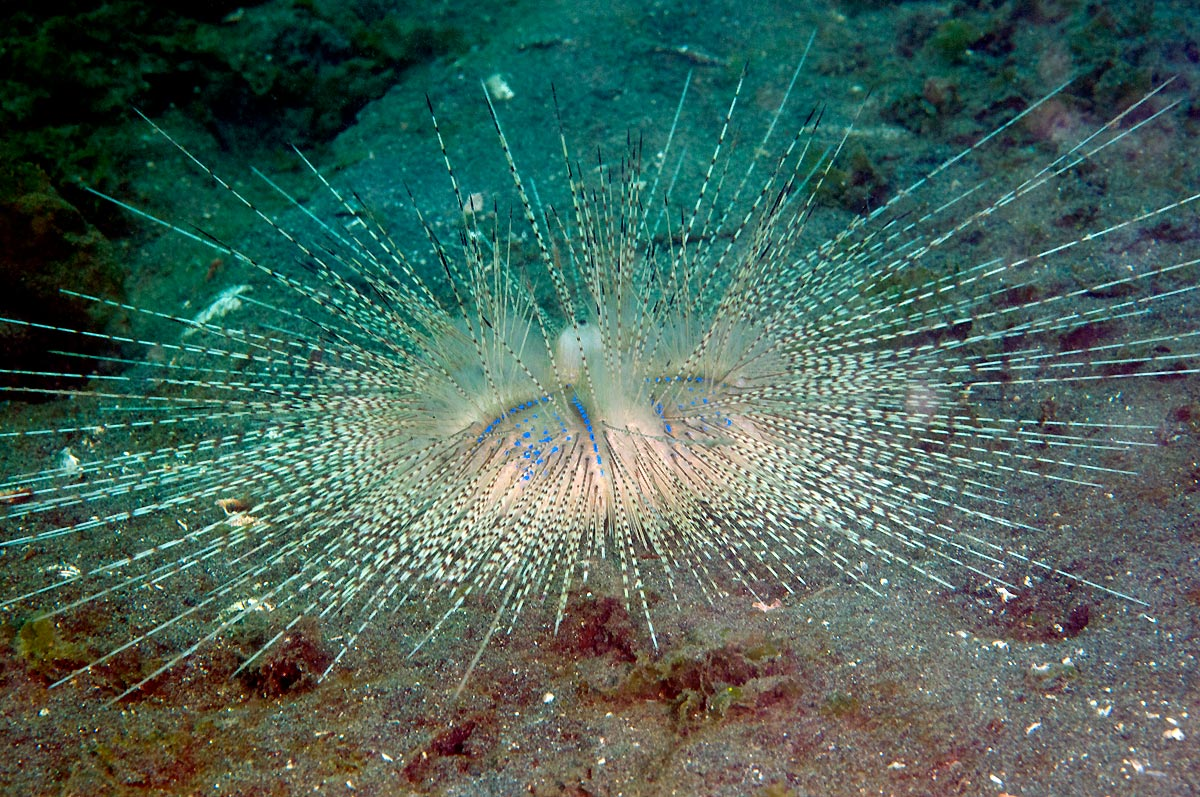
Chaetodiadema granulatum

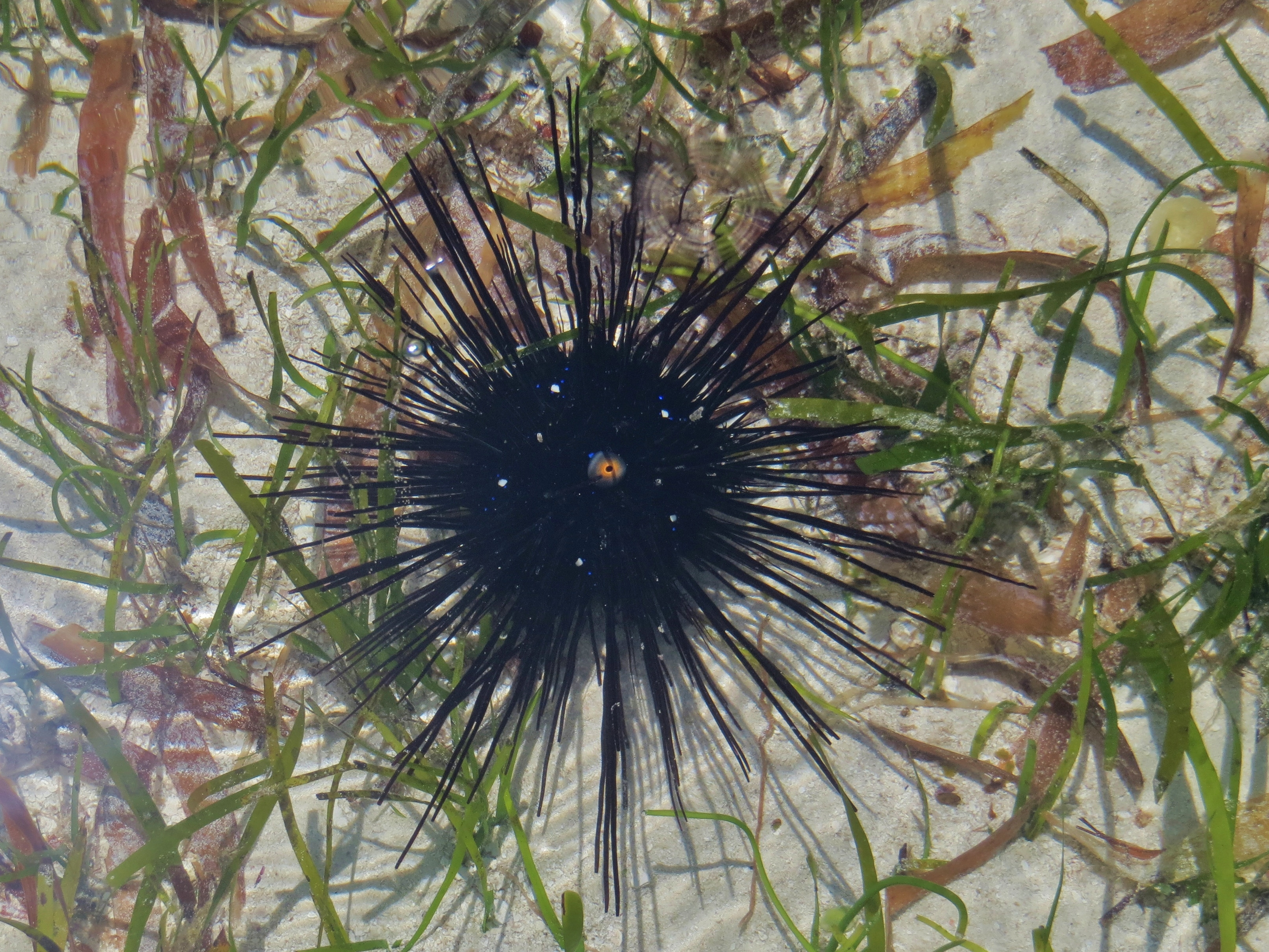
Diadema setosum.

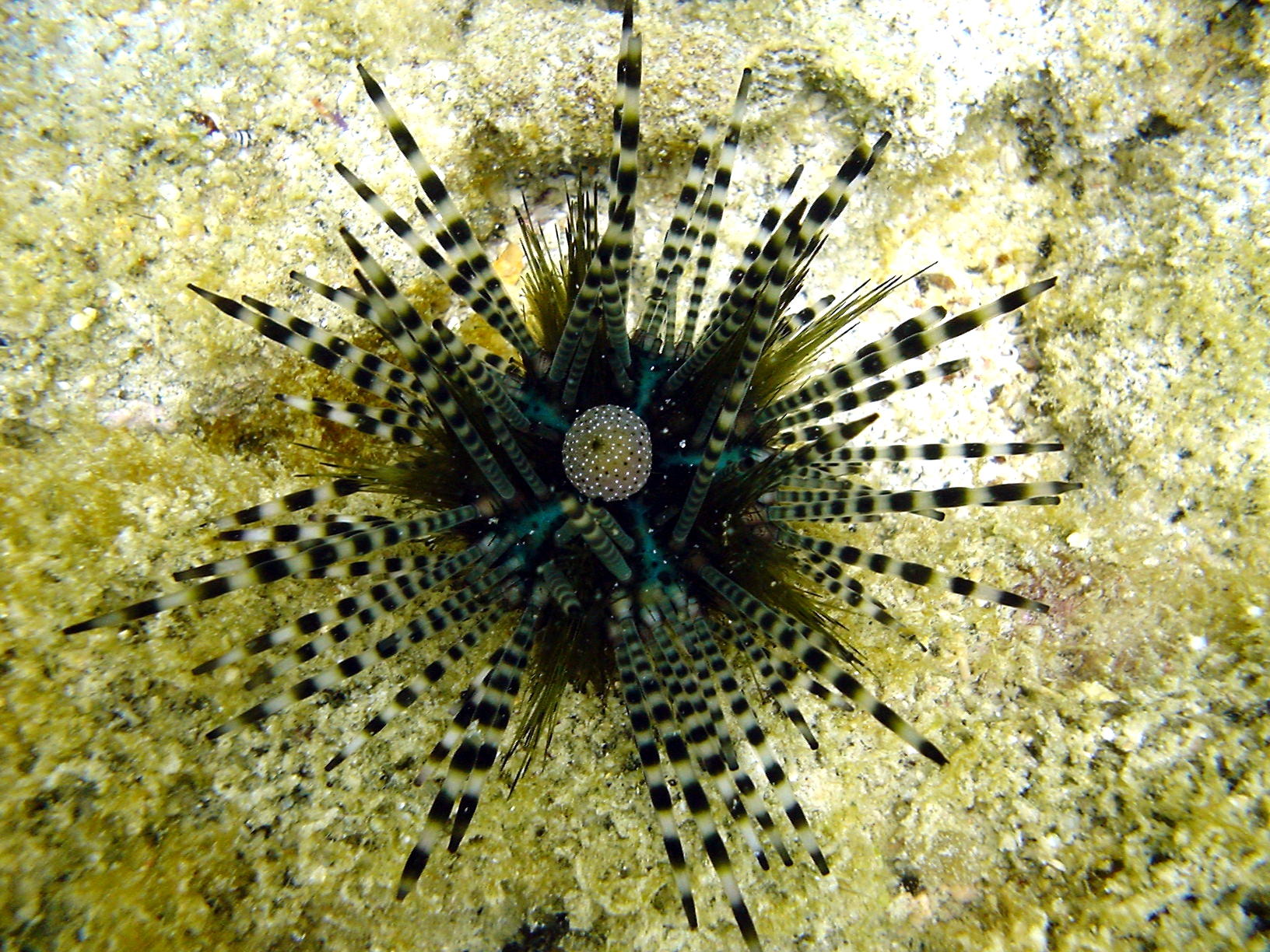
Echinothrix calamaris.
