= Hubert Lyman Clark =

American zoologist (1870–1947)

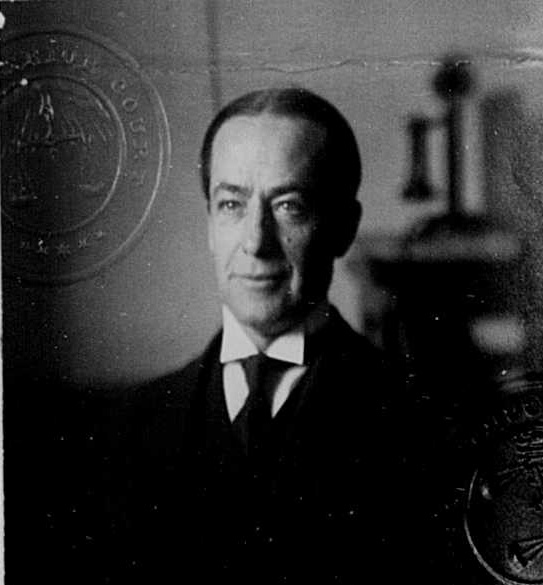
- Clark circa 1916
- Born: January 9, 1870; Amherst, Massachusetts
- Died: July 31, 1947 (aged 77); Cambridge, Massachusetts
- Resting place: Amherst West Cemetery
- Education: Amherst College; Johns Hopkins University
- Scientific career
- Fields: Zoology; Echinoderms; Marine invertebrates
- Workplaces: Museum of Comparative Zoology at Harvard University
- Doctoral advisor: William Keith Brooks
- Author abbrev. (zoology): H.L. Clark

Hubert Lyman Clark (January 9, 1870 – July 31, 1947) was an American zoologist. He received the Clarke Medal from the Royal Society of New South Wales in 1947. A son of UMass Amherst president William Smith Clark, he spent more than 40 years as a professor and curator at the Museum of Comparative Zoology at Harvard University.

== Life and career ==
Clark was born on January 9, 1870, in Amherst, Massachusetts, to William Smith Clark, president of Massachusetts Agricultural College, and Harriet Kapuolani (née Richards). He attended Amherst College (A.B., 1892) and Johns Hopkins University (Ph.D., 1897), where he studied with William Keith Brooks and became interested in marine biology. After graduation, he taught biology for two years at Amherst College and subsequently served as professor of biology at Olivet College in Michigan from 1899 to 1905.

In 1905, Clark joined the Museum of Comparative Zoology at Harvard University as an assistant in invertebrate zoology. In 1910 Clark became curator of echinoderms and in 1927 curator of marine invertebrates and associate professor of zoology, retiring from the classroom in 1935 and retiring as curator by August 1946. Through collecting trips to Caribbean and Australia, he grew the museum's collections of sea stars, brittle stars, sea lilies, and sea cucumbers. He was acting professor at Williams College in 1929, acting associate professor at Stanford University in 1936, and research associate at the Allan Hancock Foundation at the University of Southern California in 1946–47.

Clark cultivated a wide range of research interests, but after 1910 his chief research interest lay with Australian fauna. In 1947, he received the Clarke Medal from the Royal Society of New South Wales "in recognition of his distinguished contributions to natural science, particularly in regard to the elucidation of Echinodermata of Australia." Olivet College awarded him an honorary Doctor of Science degree in 1927.

In 1899, Clark married Frances Lee (née Snell), who accompanied him on many of his field trips and sketched specimens to illustrate his scientific writings. He died at Mount Auburn Hospital in Cambridge, Massachusetts, on July 31, 1947, at the age of 77.

== Work ==
Clark conducted field research in California, Jamaica, Bermuda, Tobago, the Galápagos Islands, the Pacific coasts of South and Central America, and Australia, where he collected in 1913, 1929, and 1932. He published many papers dealing with echinoderms (100+ articles) birds (20 articles), snakes, butterflies, and flowers. His publications include:

- The Birds of Amherst and Vicinity (1887)
- The Echinoderms of Porto Rico (1901)
- A New Ophiuran from the West Indies (1910)
- North Pacific Ophiurans in the Collection of the United States National Museum (1911)
- The Echinoderm Fauna of Australia, Its Composition and Its Origin (1946) (recording all known species including fossils)

He also contributed to The New International Encyclopaedia and the Dictionary of American Biography.

Awards
Preceded by John McConnell Black	Clarke Medal; 1947	Succeeded by Arthur Bache Walkom
