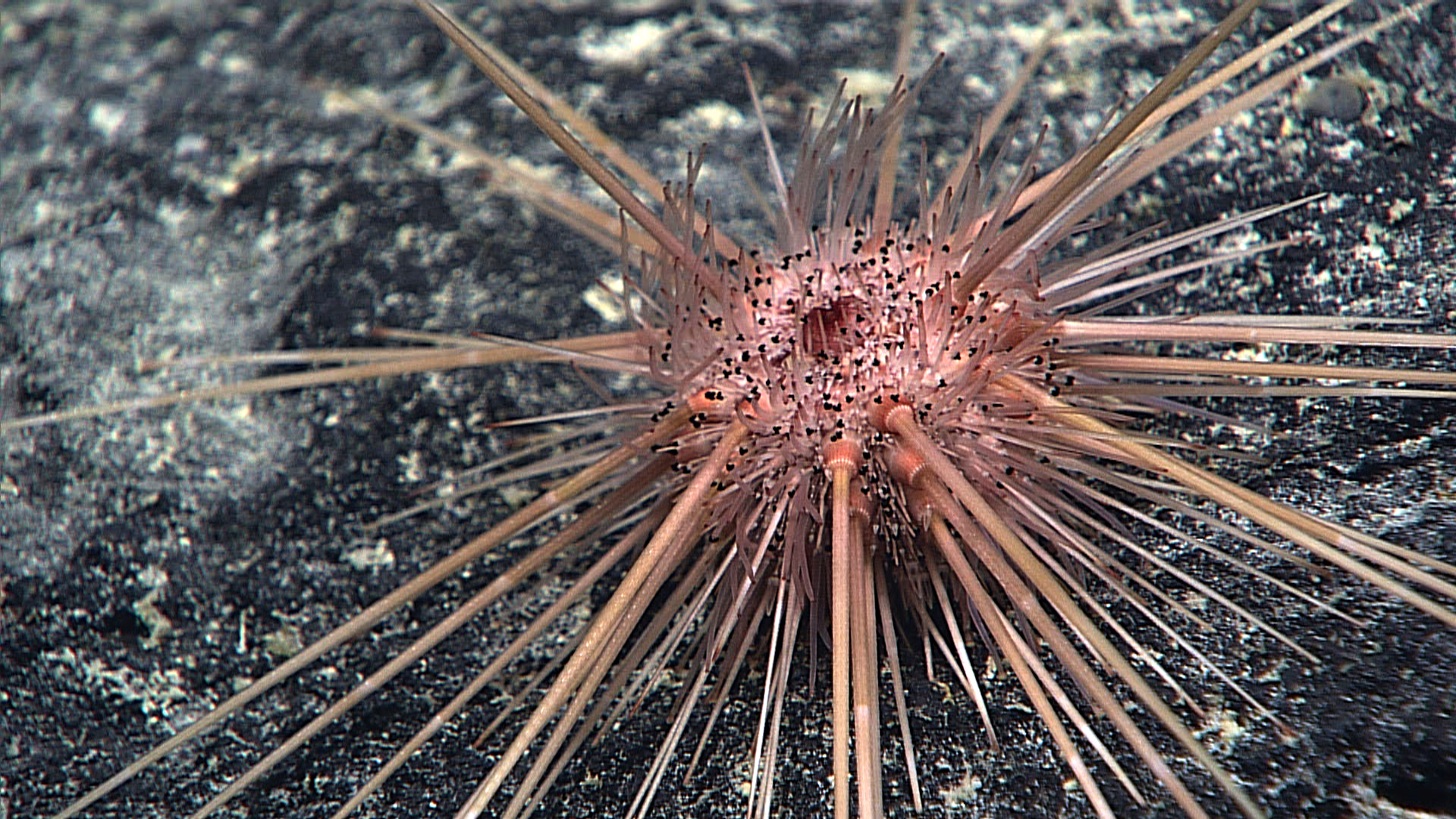
- Caenopedina cf. hawaiiensis seen off Hawaii by NOAAS Okeanos Explorer mission

Scientific classification
- Kingdom: Animalia
- Phylum: Echinodermata
- Class: Echinoidea
- Order: Pedinoida
- Family: Pedinidae; Pomel, 1883

Genera
- †Archaeodiadema Gregory, 1896 (nomen dubium); Caenopedina A. Agassiz, 1869; †Diademopsis Desor, 1855; †Echinopedina Cotteau, 1866; †Hemipedina Wright, 1855; †Leiopedina Cotteau, 1866; †Leptocidaris Quenstedt, 1858; †Orthocidaris Cotteau, 1862; †Palaeopedina Lambert, 1900; †Pedina L. Agassiz, 1838; †Phymopedina Pomel, 1883; †Polypedina Lambert, 1933; †Pseudopedina Cotteau, 1858; †Thieulinipedina Vadet, Nicolleau & Pineau, 1996

= Pedinidae =

Family of sea urchins

Pedinidae is a family of echinoderms.
