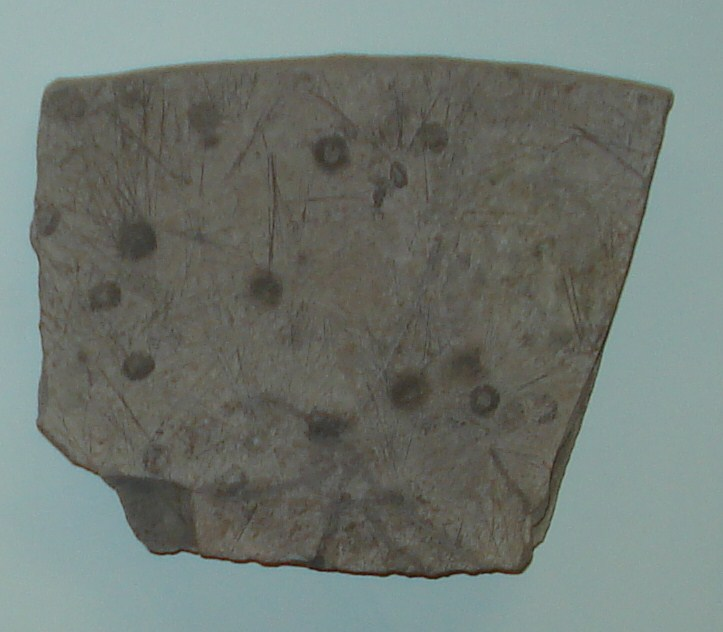
- Diademopsis crinifera fossils

Scientific classification
- Kingdom: Animalia
- Phylum: Echinodermata
- Class: Echinoidea
- Subclass: Euechinoidea
- Infraclass: Acroechinoidea
- Order: Pedinoida; Mortensen, 1939

= Pedinoida =

Pedinoida Temporal range: Early Triassic–Recent

Order of sea urchins

Pedinoida is an order of sea urchins, containing the family Pedinidae with a single living genus, Caenopedina. The group was much more diverse during the Mesozoic, and represents the oldest surviving order of euechinoid sea urchins.

They are distinguished from other sea urchins by the presence of a rigid test with tessellated plates. While their primary spines are solid, the smaller ones may be hollow, further distinguishing them from the closely related orders Diadematoida and Echinothurioida, which possess only hollow spines.
