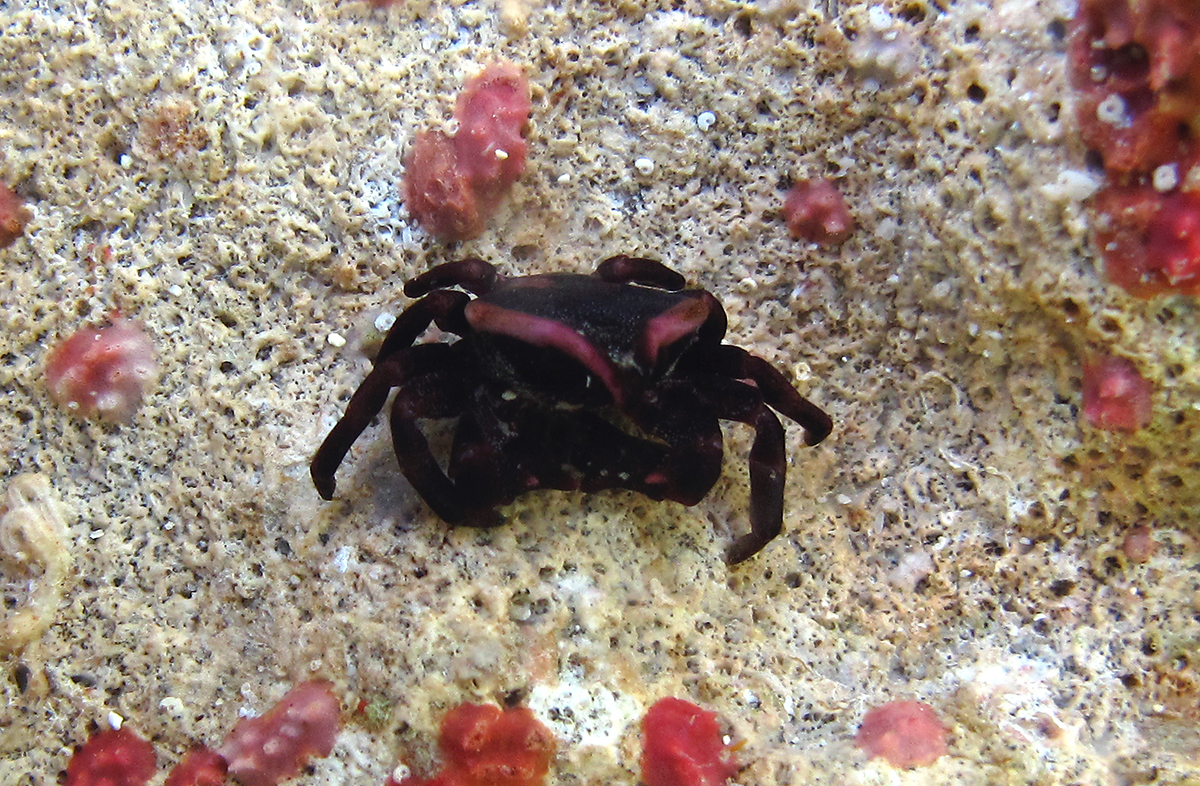
- Echinoecus pentagonus

Scientific classification
- Domain: Eukaryota
- Kingdom: Animalia
- Phylum: Arthropoda
- Class: Malacostraca
- Order: Decapoda
- Suborder: Pleocyemata
- Infraorder: Brachyura
- Family: Pilumnidae
- Genus: Echinoecus; Rathbun, 1894

Type species
- Echinoecus pentagonus Rathbun, 1894

Synonyms
- Proechinoecus Ward, 1934

= Echinoecus =

Genus of crabs

Echinoecus is a genus of crabs that live in association with sea urchins. Formerly considered monotypic, the genus is now thought to contain three species:

- Echinoecus nipponicus Miyake, 1939 – Japan, on Heliocidaris crassispina (Echinometridae) and Pseudocentrotus depressus (Strongylocentrotidae)
- Echinoecus pentagonus (A. Milne-Edwards, 1879) – East Africa and Red Sea to Hawaii and French Polynesia, on Diadema savignyi, D. setosum, Echinothrix calamaris and E. diadema (Diadematidae), Heterocentrotus mammillatus (Echinometridae) and Pseudocentrotus depressus (Strongylocentrotidae)
- Echinoecus sculptus (Ward, 1934) – Christmas Island, on Colobocentrotus atratus (Echinometridae)
