= Pilumnus novaezealandiae =

Scientific classification
- Kingdom: Animalia
- Phylum: Arthropoda
- Clade: Pancrustacea
- Class: Malacostraca
- Order: Decapoda
- Suborder: Pleocyemata
- Infraorder: Brachyura
- Family: Pilumnidae
- Genus: Pilumnus
- Species: P. novaezealandiae

Binomial name
- Pilumnus novaezealandiae Filhol, 1886

Species of crab

Pilumnus novaezealandiae is a species of crab in the Pilumnoidea superfamily. It is endemic to New Zealand.

== Description ==
This species of crab is unique within the Brachyura family because the Zoea larvae stage is passed through with in the egg and development is abbreviated. The common name of this species is 'bristled black-finger crab’.
