= Hairy crab =

Hairy crab may refer to:

- Pilumnus hirtellus, a species of European crab
- Chinese mitten crab, also known as Shanghai hairy crab and used in cuisine
