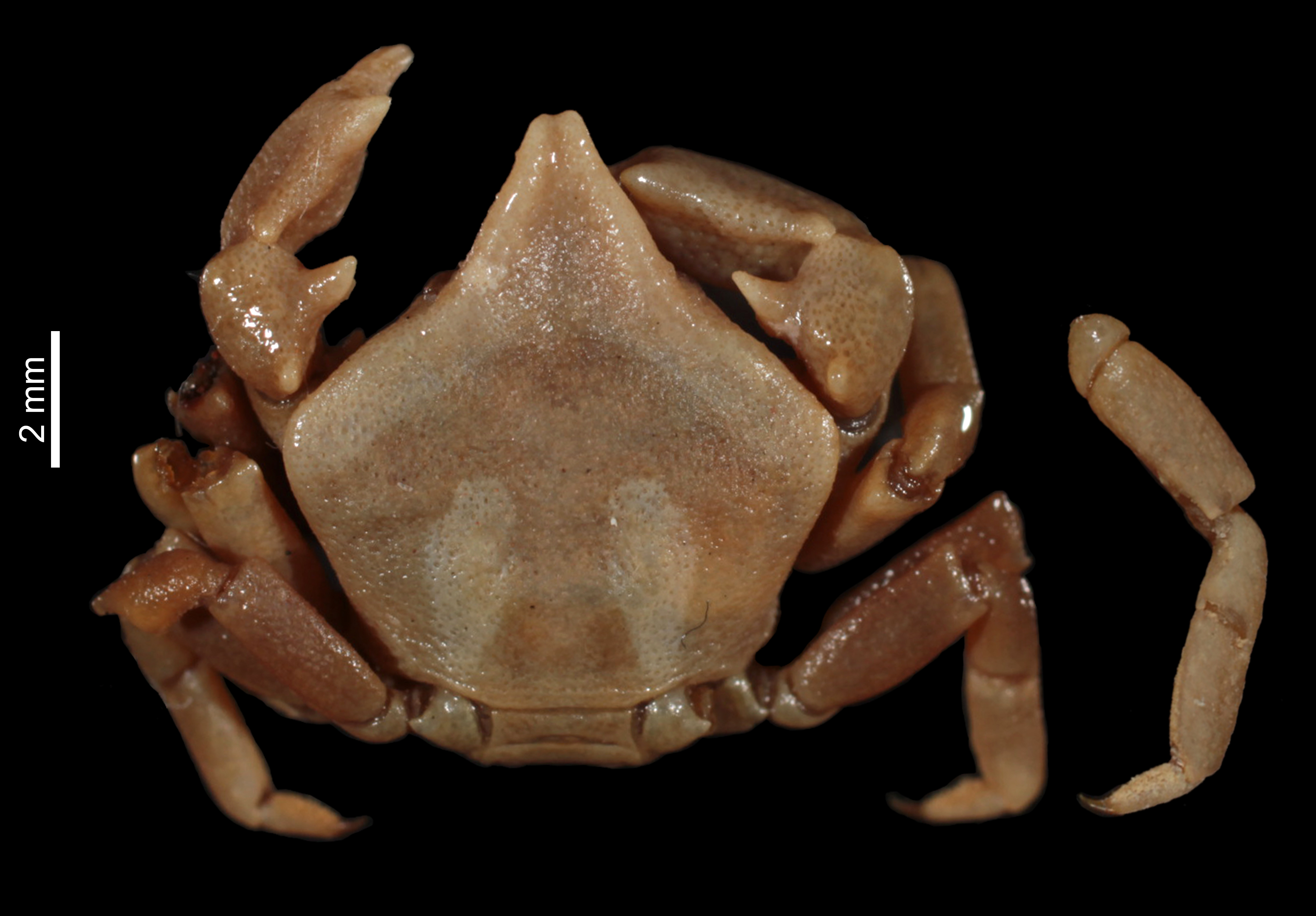

Scientific classification
- Kingdom: Animalia
- Phylum: Arthropoda
- Clade: Pancrustacea
- Class: Malacostraca
- Order: Decapoda
- Suborder: Pleocyemata
- Infraorder: Brachyura
- Family: Pilumnidae
- Genus: Echinoecus
- Species: E. pentagonus

Binomial name
- Echinoecus pentagonus (A. Milne-Edwards, 1879)

= Echinoecus pentagonus =

Species of crab

Echinoecus pentagonus, the sea urchin crab, is a species of crab in the family Pilumnidae found from the Red Sea and East Africa to French Polynesia and the Hawaiian Islands. This crab is a parasite that lives in the rectum of a sea urchin. In Hawaii, it chooses only Echinothrix calamaris, leaving few of these urchins unpopulated. Its curved and pointed carapace reaches only 0.5 inches (1.3 cm) in width.

Taxonomic synonyms of E. pentagonus include:

- Echinoecus klunzingeri Miyake, 1939
- Echinoecus pentagonus Rathbun, 1894
- Echinoecus rathbunae Miyake, 1939
- Eumedon convictor Bouvier & Seurat, 1906
- Eumedon pentagonus A. Milne-Edwards, 1879
- Eumedonus petiti Gravier, 1922
- Liomedon pentagonus Klunzinger, 1906
