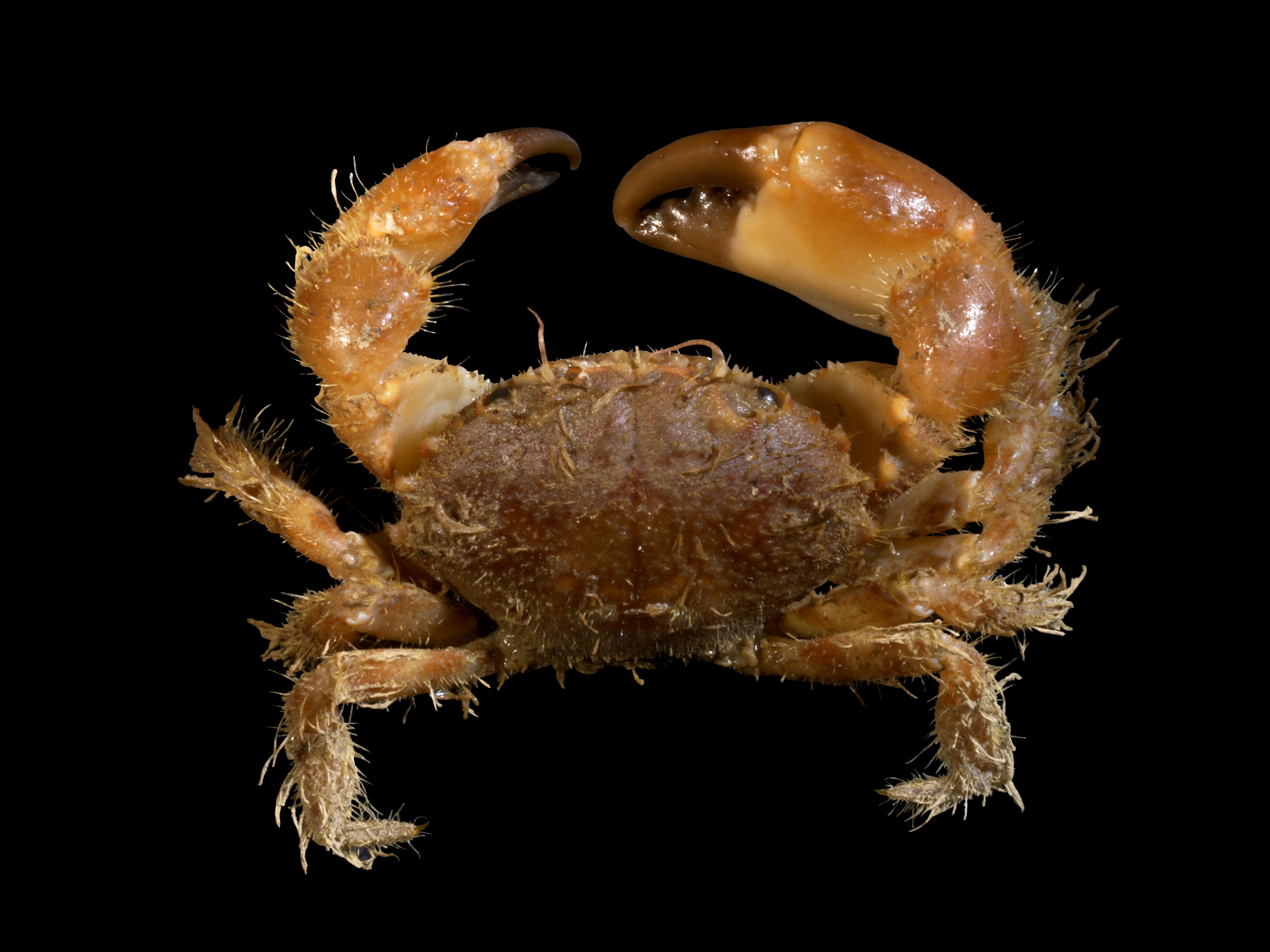
- Pilumnus hirtellus

Scientific classification
- Kingdom: Animalia
- Phylum: Arthropoda
- Class: Malacostraca
- Order: Decapoda
- Suborder: Pleocyemata
- Infraorder: Brachyura
- Subsection: Heterotremata
- Superfamily: Pilumnoidea; Samouelle, 1819

Families
- Galenidae; Pilumnidae; Tanaochelidae

= Pilumnoidea =

Pilumnoidea Temporal range: Maastrichtian–Recent

Superfamily of crabs

Pilumnoidea is a superfamily of crabs, whose members were previously included in the Xanthoidea. The three families are unified by the free articulation of all the segments of the male crab's abdomen and by the form of the gonopods. The earliest fossils assigned to this group are of Eocene age.

== Classification ==
Pilumnidae is by far the largest of the three families, with 73 of the 78 genera:

Pilumnidae Samouelle, 1819

- Subfamily Calmaniinae Števčić, 1991
  - Calmania Laurie, 1906
- Subfamily Pilumninae Samouelle, 1819
  - Actumnus Dana, 1851
  - Aniptumnus Ng, 2002
  - Bathypilumnus Ng & L. W. H. Tan, 1984
  - Benthopanope Davie, 1989
  - Budapanopeus † Müller & Collins, 1991
  - Cryptopilumnus Hsueh, Huang & Ng, 2009
  - Danielum Vázquez-Bader & Gracia, 1995
  - Eohalimede † Blow & Manning, 1996
  - Eopilumnus † Beschin et al., 2002
  - Eumorphactaea † Bittner, 1875
  - Eurycarcinus A. Milne-Edwards, 1867
  - Galenopsis † A. Milne-Edwards, 1865
  - Glabropilumnus Balss, 1932
  - Gorgonariana Galil & Takeda, 1988
  - Heteropanope Stimpson, 1858
  - Heteropilumnus De Man, 1895
  - Latopilumnus Türkay & Schuhmacher, 1985
  - Lentilumnus Galil & Takeda, 1988
  - Lobogalenopsis † Müller & Collins, 1991
  - Lobopilumnus A. Milne-Edwards, 1880
  - Lophopilumnus Miers, 1886
  - Nanopilumnus Takeda, 1974
  - Neoactumnus T. Sakai, 1965
  - Parapleurophrycoides Nobili, 1906
  - Pilumnopeus A. Milne-Edwards, 1867
  - Pilumnus Leach, 1816
  - Priapipilumnus Davie, 1989
  - Pseudactumnus Balss, 1933
  - Serenepilumnus Türkay & Schuhmacher, 1985
  - Serenolumnus Galil & Takeda, 1988
  - Takedana Davie, 1989
  - Viaderiana Ward, 1942
  - Xestopilumnus Ng & Dai, 1997
  - Xlumnus Galil & Takeda, 1988
- Subfamily Eumedoninae Dana, 1853
  - Ceratocarcinus Adams & White in White, 1847
  - Echinoecus Rathbun, 1894
  - Eumedonus H. Milne Edwards, 1837
  - Gonatonotus Adams & White, in White, 1847
  - Hapalonotus Rathbun, 1897
  - Harrovia Adams & White, 1849
  - Permanotus D. G. B. Chia & Ng, 1998
  - Rhabdonotus Milne-Edwards, 1879
  - Santeella † Blow & Manning, 1996
  - Tauropus D. G. B. Chia & Ng, 1998
  - Tiaramedon D. G. B. Chia & Ng, 1998
  - Viacarcinus † Blow & Manning, 1996
  - Zebrida White, 1847
  - Zebridonus D. G. B. Chia, Ng & Castro, 1995
- Subfamily Rhizopinae Stimpson, 1858
  - Caecopilumnus Borradaile, 1902
  - Camptoplax Miers, 1884
  - Ceratoplax Stimpson, 1858
  - Cryptocoeloma Miers, 1884
  - Cryptolutea Ward, 1936
  - Itampolus Serène & Peyrot-Clausade, 1977
  - Lophoplax Tesch, 1918
  - Luteocarcinus Ng, 1990
  - Mertonia Laurie, 1906
  - Paranotonyx Nobili, 1905
  - Paraselwynia Tesch, 1918
  - Peleianus Serène, 1971
  - Pronotonyx Ward, 1936
  - Rhizopa Stimpson, 1858
  - Pseudocryptocoeloma Ward, 1936
  - Pseudolitochira Ward, 1942
  - Rhizopoides Ng, 1987
  - Ser Rathbun, 1931
  - Typhlocarcinops Rathbun, 1909
  - Typhlocarcinus Stimpson, 1858
  - Zehntneria Takeda, 1972
- Subfamily Xenopthalmodinae Števčić, 2005
  - Arges † De Haan, 1835
  - Xenopthalmodes Richters, 1880

Galenidae Alcock, 1898

- Dentoxanthus Stephensen, 1946
- Galene De Haan, 1833
- Halimede De Haan, 1835
- Parapanope De Man, 1895

Tanaochelidae Ng & P. F. Clark, 2000

- Tanaocheles Kropp, 1984

== Gallery ==
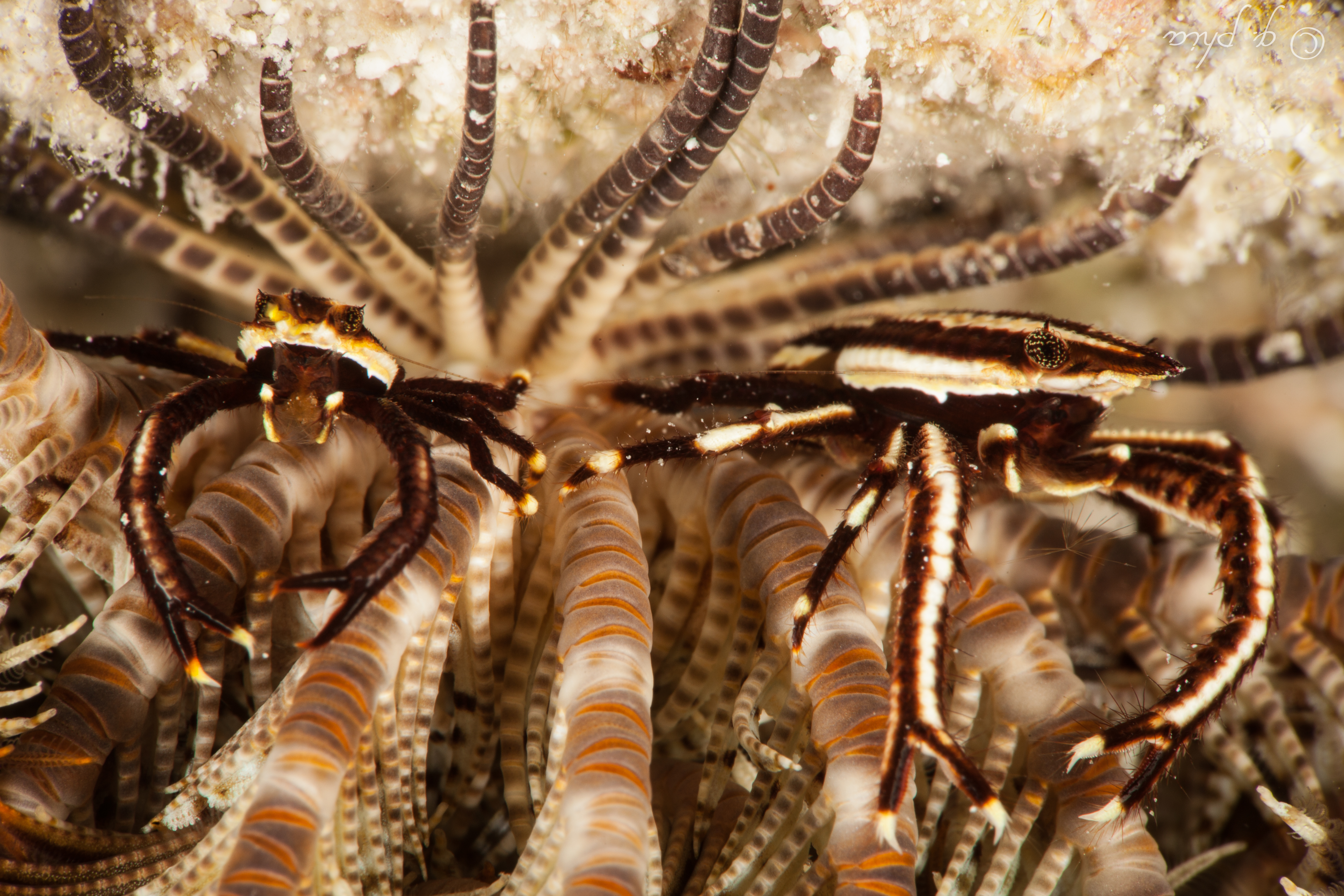
Crinoid crab one of Pilumnidae Family at Wakatobi National Park, 2018

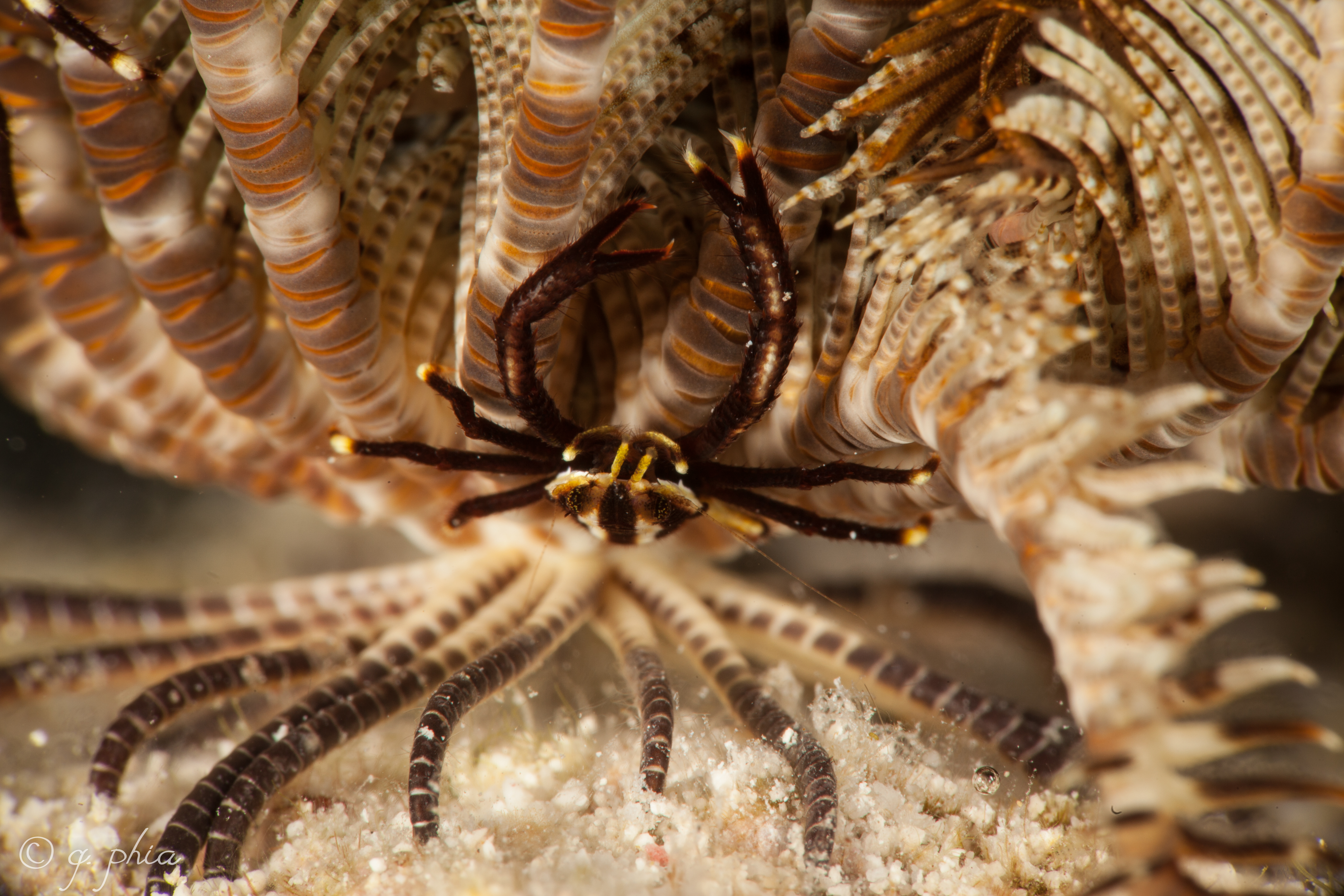
Crinoid crab at Wakatobi National Park, 2018

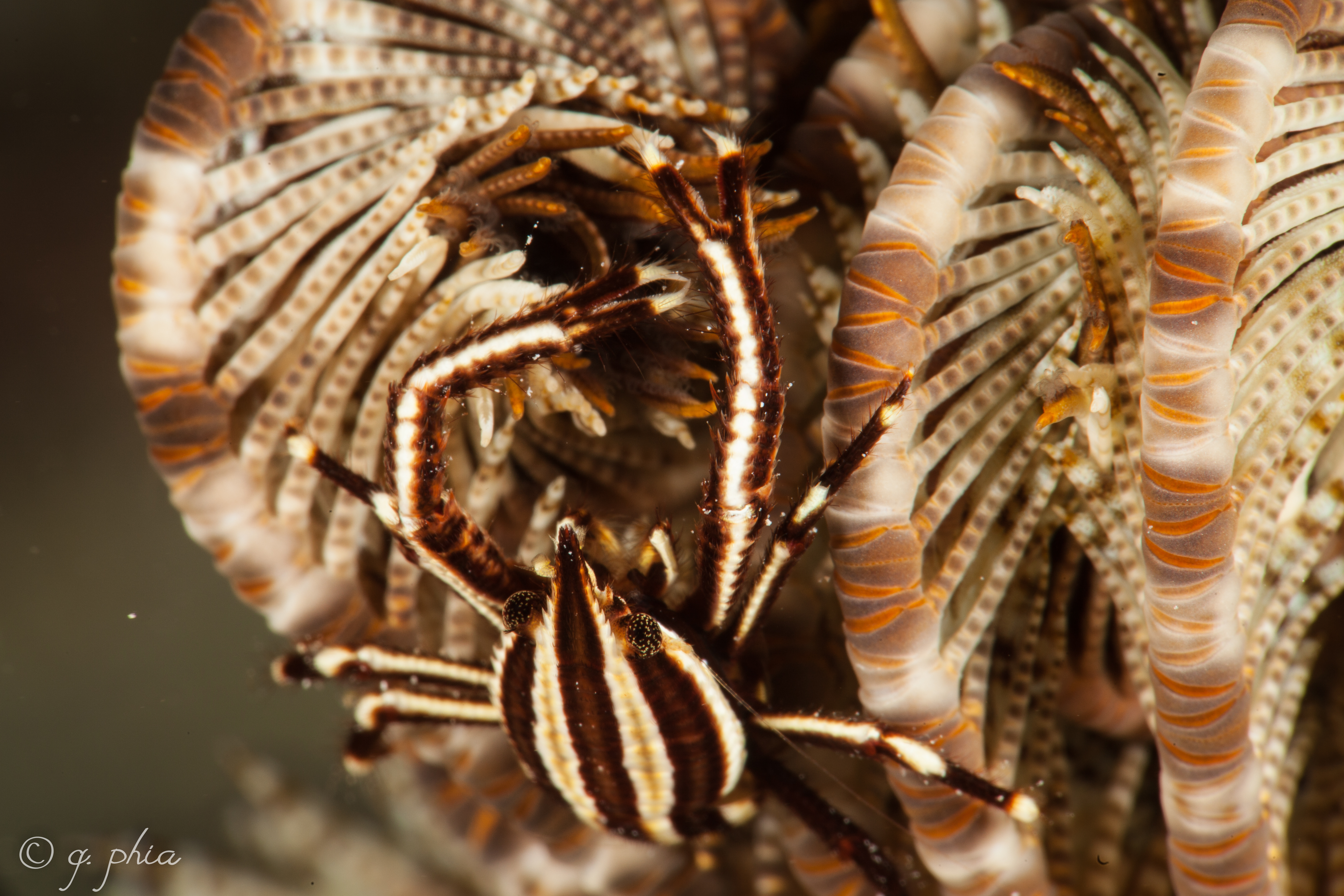
Crinoid crab at Wakatobi National Park, 2018
