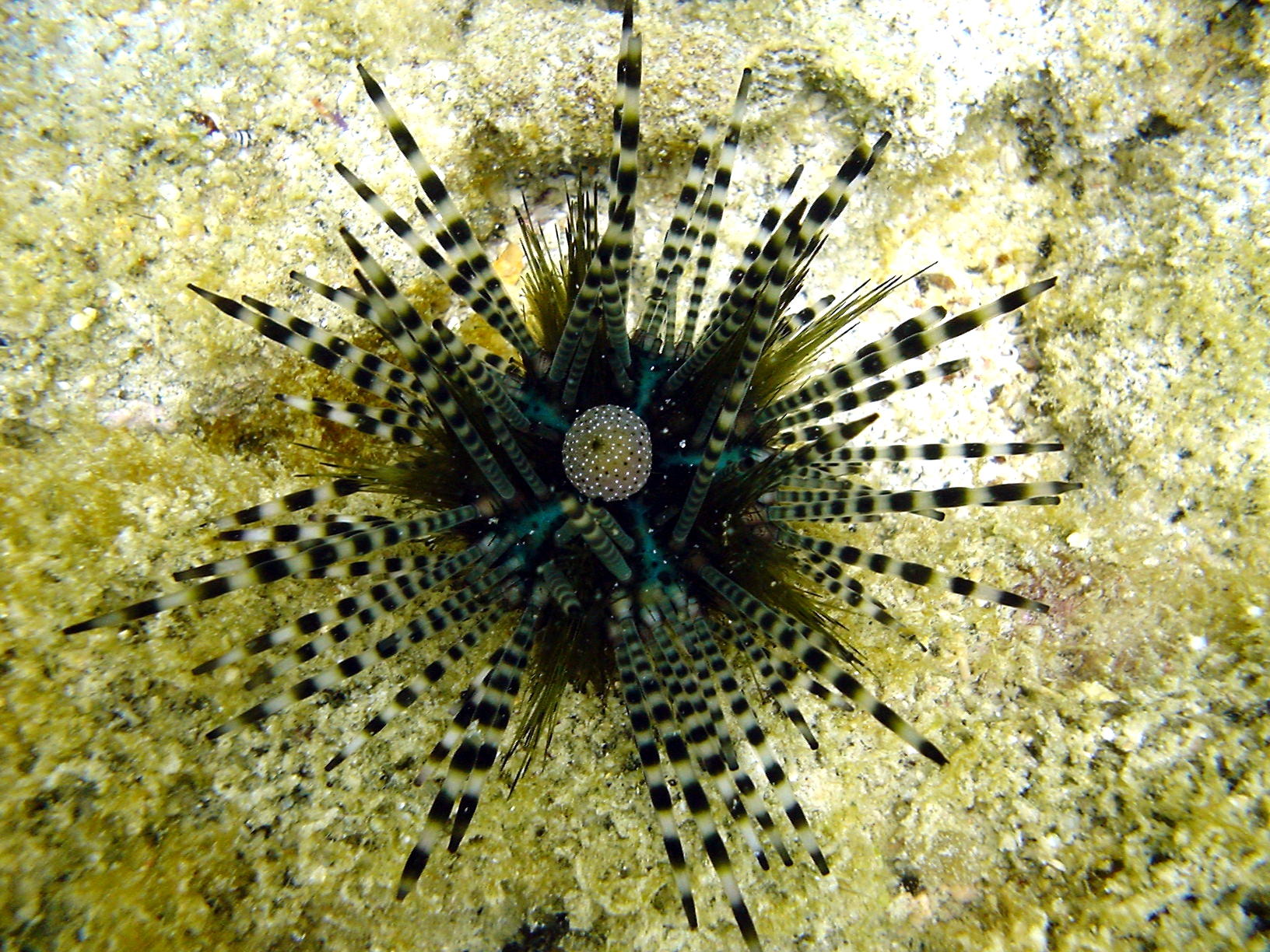
- Echinothrix calamaris

Scientific classification
- Domain: Eukaryota
- Kingdom: Animalia
- Phylum: Echinodermata
- Class: Echinoidea
- Order: Diadematoida
- Family: Diadematidae
- Genus: Echinothrix; Peters, 1853

Species
- Echinothrix diadema; Echinothrix calamaris

= Echinothrix =

Genus of sea urchins

Echinothrix is a genus of sea urchins which was first described in 1853 by Wilhelm Peters, a German naturalist and explorer.

== Description and characteristics ==
The genus contains two species, E. diadema and E. calamaris. These can be distinguished by the fact that E. diadema has fully black spines whereas E. calamaris has striped spines. Both of these species are found in the Indo-Pacific region, living on coral reefs.

== Taxonomy ==
According to World Register of Marine Species :

Image	Scientific name	Distribution
	Echinothrix diadema (Linnaeus, 1758)	Indo-Pacific coral reefs, from the Red Sea to Hawaii
	Echinothrix calamaris (Pallas, 1774)	Indo-Pacific region, from eastern coast of Africa to French Polynesia, including Hawaii and the Red Sea
