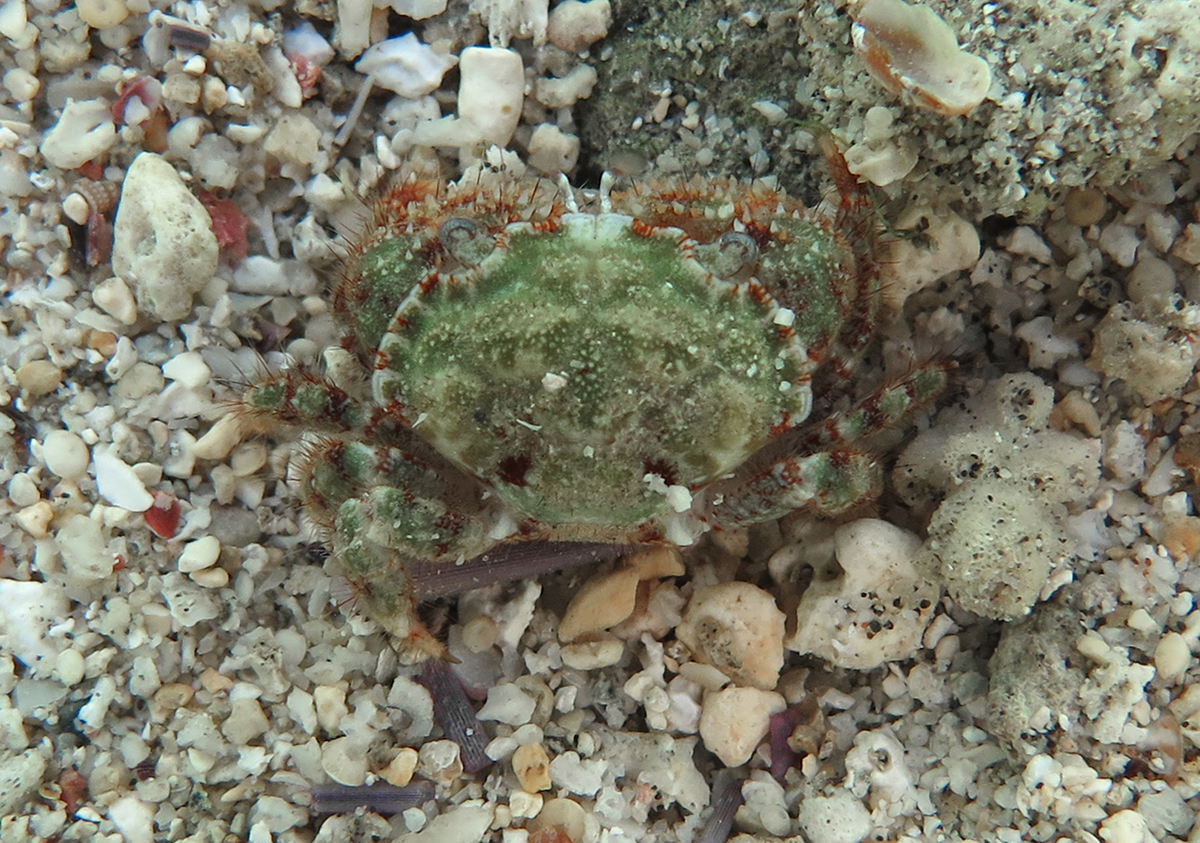
- Actumnus digitalis

Scientific classification
- Kingdom: Animalia
- Phylum: Arthropoda
- Clade: Pancrustacea
- Class: Malacostraca
- Order: Decapoda
- Suborder: Pleocyemata
- Infraorder: Brachyura
- Family: Pilumnidae
- Genus: Actumnus; Dana, 1851

Type species
- Actumnus tomensotus Dana, 1852

= Actumnus =

Actumnus Temporal range: Miocene–Recent

Genus of crabs

Actumnus is a genus of crabs in the family Pilumnidae. Alongside the 28 extant species, it has a fossil record extending back into the Miocene.

== Species ==
Actumnus contains 28 extant species:

- Actumnus amirantensis Rathbun, 1911
- Actumnus anthelmei Ward, 1942
- Actumnus arbutum Alcock, 1898
- Actumnus asper (Rüppell, 1830)
- Actumnus calypso (Herbst, 1801)
- Actumnus davoensis Ward, 1941
- Actumnus digitalis (Rathbun, 1907)
- Actumnus dorsipes (Stimpson, 1858)
- Actumnus elegans De Man, 1888
- Actumnus fissifrons Alcock, 1898
- Actumnus forficigerus (Stimpson, 1858)
- Actumnus globulus Heller, 1891
- Actumnus granotuberosus Garth & Kim, 1983
- Actumnus griffini Takeda & Webber, 2006
- Actumnus intermedius Balss, 1922
- Actumnus margarodes MacGilchrist, 1905
- Actumnus marissinicus Takeda & Miyake, 1977
- Actumnus miliaris A. Milne-Edwards, 1865
- Actumnus obesus Dana, 1852
- Actumnus parvulus A. Milne-Edwards, 1865
- Actumnus setifer (De Haan, 1835)
- Actumnus setosiareolatus Takeda, 1977
- Actumnus similis Takeda & Miyake, 1969
- Actumnus simplex Rathbun, 1911
- Actumnus squamosus (De Haan, 1835)
- Actumnus taiwanicus Ho, Yu & Ng, 2001
- Actumnus targionii Cano, 1889
- Actumnus tesselatus Alcock, 1898

Two further species are known only from fossils.
