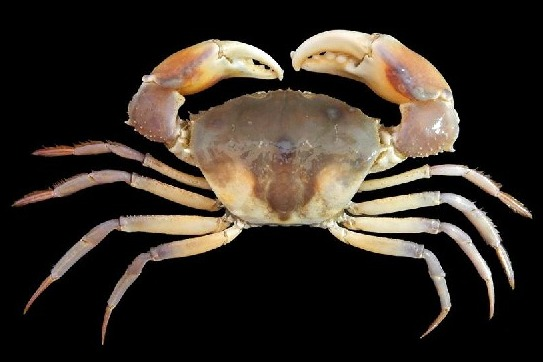
- Galene bispinosa

Scientific classification
- Domain: Eukaryota
- Kingdom: Animalia
- Phylum: Arthropoda
- Class: Malacostraca
- Order: Decapoda
- Suborder: Pleocyemata
- Infraorder: Brachyura
- Section: Eubrachyura
- Subsection: Heterotremata
- Superfamily: Pilumnoidea
- Family: Galenidae; Alcock, 1898

Genera
- 4, see text

= Galenidae =

Family of crabs

Galenidae is a family of crabs, one of three in the superfamily Pilumnoidea. It contains four genera, three of which are monotypic. At present five species have been described in this family.

== Genera ==
- Dentoxanthus Stephensen, 1946
- Galene De Haan, 1833
- Halimede De Haan, 1835
- Parapanope De Man, 1895
