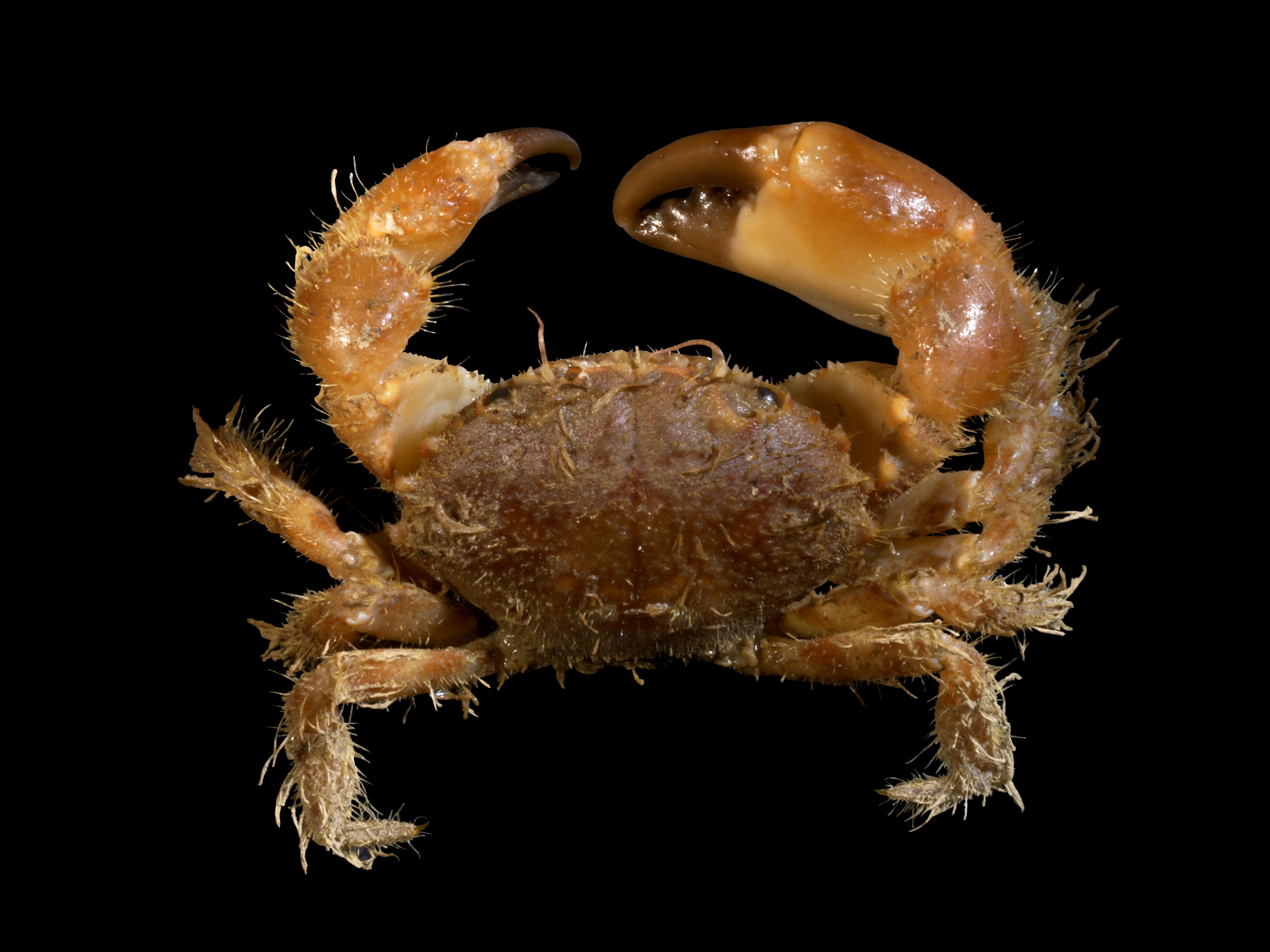
- Pilumnus hirtellus

Scientific classification
- Domain: Eukaryota
- Kingdom: Animalia
- Phylum: Arthropoda
- Class: Malacostraca
- Order: Decapoda
- Suborder: Pleocyemata
- Infraorder: Brachyura
- Family: Pilumnidae
- Genus: Pilumnus; Leach, 1816

Synonyms
- Acanthus Lockington, 1877

= Pilumnus (crab) =

Genus of crabs

Pilumnus is a genus of crabs, containing the following species:

- Pilumnus acanthosoma Ng, 2000
- Pilumnus acer Rathbun, 1923
- Pilumnus acutifrons Rathbun, 1906
- Pilumnus affinis de Brito Capello, 1875
- Pilumnus amamensis Takeda & Miyake, 1968
- Pilumnus armatus Komai & Motoh, 2012
- Pilumnus australis Whitelegge, 1900
- Pilumnus balssi Takeda & Miyake, 1972
- Pilumnus bleekeri Miers, 1880
- Pilumnus bohol Komai & Motoh, 2012
- Pilumnus braueri Balss, 1933
- Pilumnus caerulescens A. Milne-Edwards, 1873
- Pilumnus calculosus Dana, 1852
- Pilumnus capillatus Ng, Dai & Yang, 1997
- Pilumnus caribaeus Desbonne in Desbonne & Schramm, 1867
- Pilumnus ceylonicus Deb, 1987
- Pilumnus chani Ng & Ho, 2003
- Pilumnus comatus Ng, Dai & Yang, 1997
- Pilumnus contrarius Rathbun, 1923
- Pilumnus cucaoensis Feldmann, Schweitzer & Encinas, 2005 †
- Pilumnus cursor A. Milne-Edwards, 1873
- Pilumnus curvipenis Komai & Motoh, 2012
- Pilumnus danai Stimpson, 1907
- Pilumnus dasypodus Kingsley, 1879
- Pilumnus deflexus A. Milne-Edwards, 1867
- Pilumnus depressus Stimpson, 1871
- Pilumnus digitalis Rathbun, 1923
- Pilumnus diomedeae Rathbun, 1894
- Pilumnus dofleini Balss, 1933
- Pilumnus elegans De Man, 1888
- Pilumnus etheridgei Rathbun, 1923
- Pilumnus eudaemoneus Nobili, 1906
- Pilumnus fernandezi Garth, 1973
- Pilumnus fissifrons Stimpson, 1858
- Pilumnus floridanus Stimpson, 1871
- Pilumnus fookimensis Collins, Lee & Noad, 2003 †
- Pilumnus gemmatus Stimpson, 1860
- Pilumnus gonzalensis Rathbun, 1894
- Pilumnus gracilipes A. Milne-Edwards, 1880
- Pilumnus granti Montgomery, 1931
- Pilumnus guinotae Takeda & Miyake, 1968
- Pilumnus habei Takeda & Miyake, 1972
- Pilumnus haswelli De Man, 1888
- Pilumnus hilarulus De Man, 1928
- Pilumnus hirsutissimus Takeda & Komatsu, 2020
- Pilumnus hirtellus (Linnaeus, 1761)
- Pilumnus holosericus Rathbun, 1898
- Pilumnus humilis Miers, 1884
- Pilumnus ikedai Takeda & Miyake, 1968
- Pilumnus incanus (Forskål, 1775)
- Pilumnus indicus (Deb, 1987)
- Pilumnus inermis A. Milne-Edwards & Bouvier, 1894
- Pilumnus integrifrontus Shen, 1948
- Pilumnus investigatoris Deb, 1987
- Pilumnus karachiensis Deb, 1987
- Pilumnus kempi Deb, 1987
- Pilumnus kingstoni (Rathbun, 1923)
- Pilumnus koepckei Türkay, 1967
- Pilumnus lacteus Stimpson, 1871
- Pilumnus laevigatus (Rathbun, 1911)
- Pilumnus lanatus Latreille, 1825
- Pilumnus levimanus Rathbun, 1933
- Pilumnus limosus Smith, 1869
- Pilumnus longicornis Hilgendorf, 1879
- Pilumnus longleyi Rathbun, 1930
- Pilumnus lumpinus Bennett, 1964
- Pilumnus maccullochi Montgomery, 1931
- Pilumnus maldivensis Borradaile, 1902
- Pilumnus mantelattoi Magalhães & Felder, 2019
- Pilumnus marshi Rathbun, 1901
- Pilumnus mediterraneus (Lőrenthey, 1897) †
- Pilumnus merodentatus Nobili, 1906
- Pilumnus miersii A. Milne-Edwards, 1880
- Pilumnus minutus De Haan, 1835
- Pilumnus monilifera Haswell, 1881
- Pilumnus murphyi Ng, 1988
- Pilumnus neglectus Balss, 1933
- Pilumnus nobilii Garth, 1948
- Pilumnus normani Miers, 1886
- Pilumnus novaezealandiae Filhol, 1885
- Pilumnus nudimanus Rathbun, 1901
- Pilumnus nuttingi Rathbun, 1906
- Pilumnus oahuensis Edmondson, 1931
- Pilumnus ohshimai Takeda & Miyake, 1970
- Pilumnus okutanii Takeda, 2024
- Pilumnus olivellai Müller, 1993 †
- Pilumnus orbitospinis Rathbun, 1911
- Pilumnus pannosus Rathbun, 1896
- Pilumnus parableekeri Ng & Tan, 1984
- Pilumnus parapilumnoides Takeda & Miyake, 1970
- Pilumnus parvulus Nobili, 1906
- Pilumnus parvusi Fahimi, Zolgharnein, Keykhosravi & Naderloo, 2021
- Pilumnus pedemontanus Ceccon & De Angeli, 2019 †
- Pilumnus peronii H. Milne Edwards, 1834
- Pilumnus perrieri A. Milne-Edwards & Bouvier, 1898
- Pilumnus persicus Fahimi, Zolgharnein, Keykhosravi & Naderloo, 2021
- Pilumnus pileiferus Ng & Tan, 1984
- Pilumnus propinquus Nobili, 1905
- Pilumnus prunosus Whitelegge, 1897
- Pilumnus pulcher Miers, 1884
- Pilumnus purpureus A. Milne-Edwards, 1873
- Pilumnus pygmaeus Boone, 1927
- Pilumnus quoii H. Milne Edwards, 1834
- Pilumnus ransoni Forest & Guinot, 1961
- Pilumnus reticulatus Stimpson, 1860
- Pilumnus ristorii De Angeli, Garassino & Pasini, 2009 †
- Pilumnus rotundus Borradaile, 1902
- Pilumnus rubroseta Ng, Dai & Yang, 1997
- Pilumnus rufopunctatus Stimpson, 1858
- Pilumnus ryukyuensis Takeda & Komatsu, 2020
- Pilumnus savignyi Heller, 1860
- Pilumnus sayi Rathbun, 1897
- Pilumnus scaber Gatt & De Angeli, 2010 †
- Pilumnus scabriusculus Adams & White, 1849
- Pilumnus schellenbergi Balss, 1933
- Pilumnus semilanatus Miers, 1884
- Pilumnus semilunaris Ng, Dai & Yang, 1997
- Pilumnus senahai Takeda & Miyake, 1968
- Pilumnus serenei Ng, 1988
- Pilumnus sluiteri De Man, 1892
- Pilumnus spinicarpus Grant & McCulloch, 1906
- Pilumnus spinifer H. Milne Edwards, 1834
- Pilumnus spinifrons Ng & Tan, 1984
- Pilumnus spinohirsutus (Lockington, 1877)
- Pilumnus spinosissimus Rathbun, 1898
- Pilumnus spinosus Filhol, 1885
- Pilumnus spinulosus Kessler, 1861
- Pilumnus spinulus Shen, 1932
- Pilumnus stebbingi Capart, 1951
- Pilumnus stimpsonii Miers, 1886
- Pilumnus subequus Rathbun, 1919 †
- Pilumnus swajayai Ng & Rahayu, 2021
- Pilumnus taeniola Rathbun, 1906
- Pilumnus tahitensis De Man, 1890
- Pilumnus takedai Ng, 1988
- Pilumnus tantulus Rathbun, 1923
- Pilumnus tectus Rathbun, 1933
- Pilumnus teixeiranus de Brito Capello, 1875
- Pilumnus telegdii Müller, 1974 †
- Pilumnus tenellus Dana, 1852
- Pilumnus terraereginae Haswell, 1882
- Pilumnus thoe (Herbst, 1803)
- Pilumnus tomentosus Latreille, 1825
- Pilumnus townsendi Rathbun, 1923
- Pilumnus trispinosus (Sakai, 1965)
- Pilumnus tuantaoensis Shen, 1948
- Pilumnus turgidulus Rathbun, 1911
- Pilumnus verrucimanus Klunzinger, 1913
- Pilumnus vespertilio (Fabricius, 1793)
- Pilumnus vestitus Haswell, 1882
- Pilumnus villosissimus (Rafinesque, 1814)
- Pilumnus vinaceus A. Milne-Edwards, 1880
- Pilumnus woodworthi Rathbun, 1902
- Pilumnus zimmeri Balss, 1933
