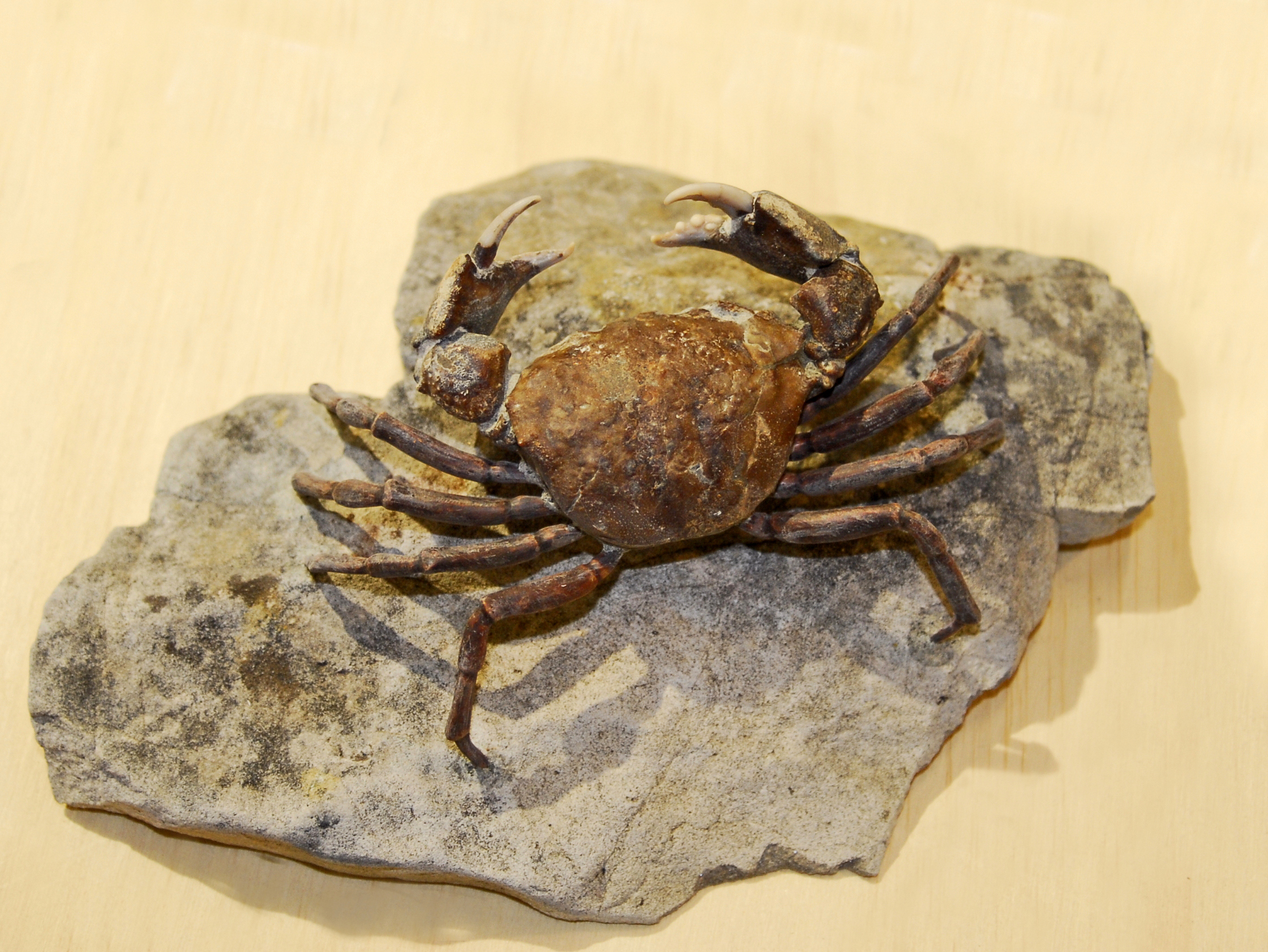
- Fossil of Galene granulifera from Pliocene of Taiwan

Scientific classification
- Domain: Eukaryota
- Kingdom: Animalia
- Phylum: Arthropoda
- Class: Malacostraca
- Order: Decapoda
- Suborder: Pleocyemata
- Infraorder: Brachyura
- Family: Galenidae
- Genus: Galene; De Haan, 1833

= Galene (crab) =

Galene Temporal range: Langhian - Quaternary

Genus of crabs

Galene is a genus of crabs belonging to the family Galenidae.

== Fossil record ==
Fossils of Galene are found in marine strata from the Langhian to Quaternary (age range: from 15.97 to 0.012 million years ago.). Fossils are known from Iran, Malaysia, New Zealand and Taiwan. Recently, a new species of this crab named Galene dashtbani one of the oldest descendants of this genus, which is about 15 million years old, has been identified from Iran.

== Species ==
Species within this genus include:

- Galene bispinosa Herbst 1804
- †Galene dashtbani Erfan Khosravi 2022 from Iran
- †Galene granulifera Lin 1947
- †Galene obscura Milne-Edwards 1865
- †Galene stipata Morris and Collins 1991
