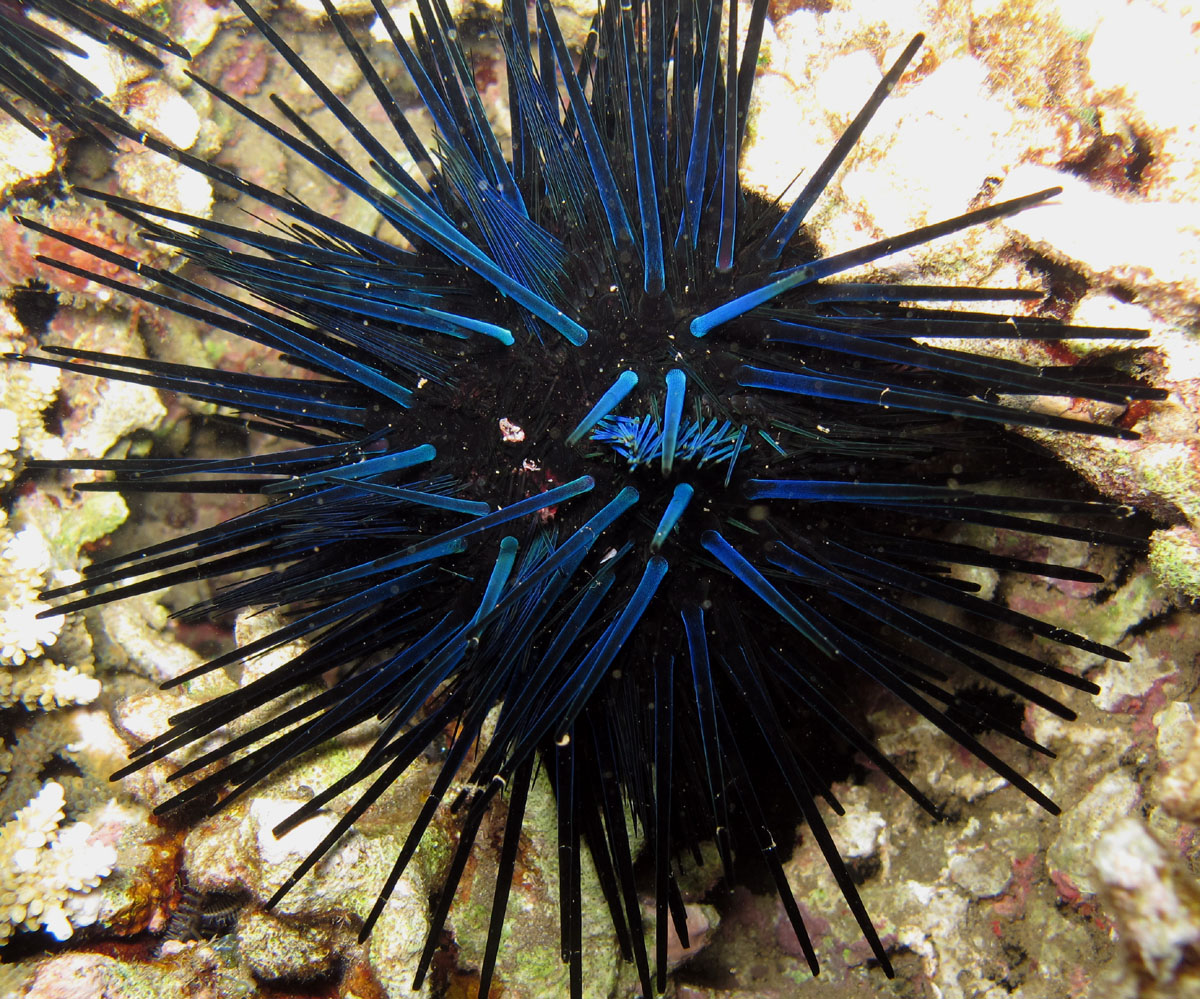

Scientific classification
- Kingdom: Animalia
- Phylum: Echinodermata
- Class: Echinoidea
- Order: Diadematoida
- Family: Diadematidae
- Genus: Echinothrix
- Species: E. diadema

Binomial name
- Echinothrix diadema (Linnaeus, 1758)

= Echinothrix diadema =

Species of sea urchin

The diadema urchin or blue-black urchin (Echinothrix diadema) is a species of tropical sea urchin, member of the Diadematidae family.

== Description and characteristics ==
Echinothrix diadema is a long spined urchin. With its spines, the typical diameter is 10–20 cm (3.9–7.9 in). The internal organs are enclosed in the test, covered by a thin dermis and epidermis. It is generally black or blue-black in colour, and always dark (the spines show a blue sheen in the light). The spines are closed at the tip; the anal sac is small and dark.

It differs from Echinothrix calamaris in that the spines are not banded, except in juveniles, and that its anal sac is small and hardly visible, and the spines show a blue sheen (whereas dark morphs of E. calamaris show a greenish tinge). Another similar species is Diadema setosum, which has longer spines and smaller test, the distinguishing feature being an orange ring around anal sac.

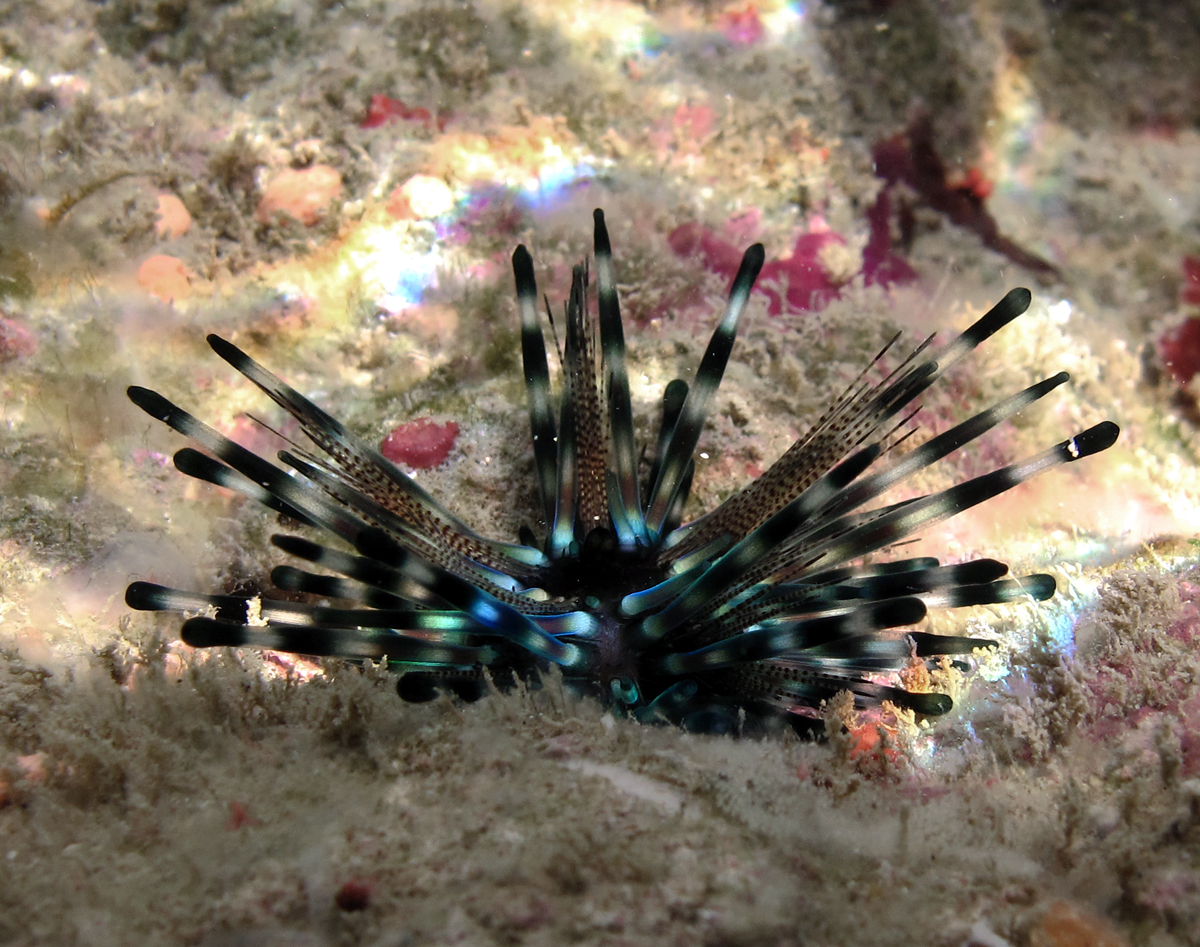
Young individual

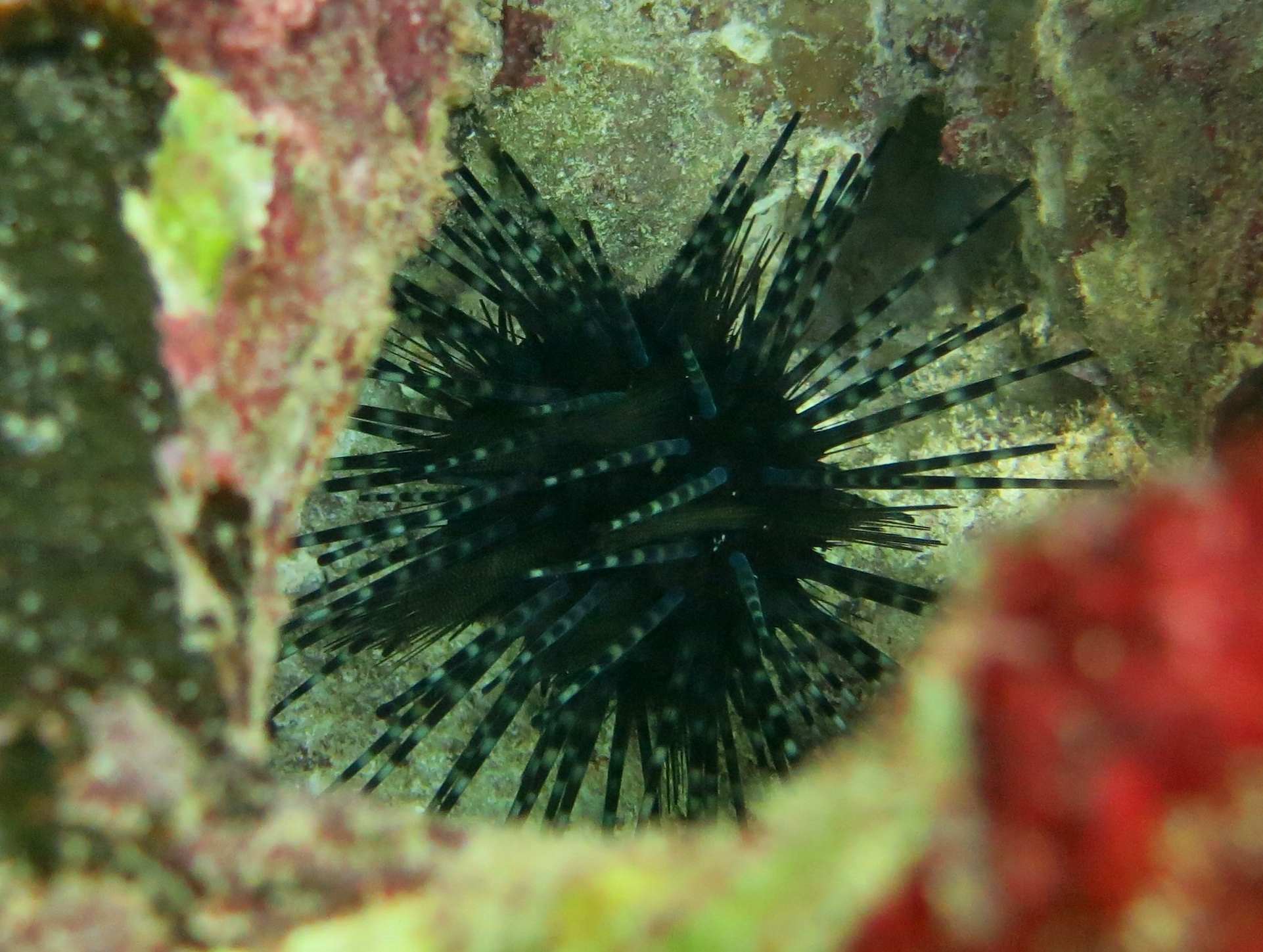
Older juvenile

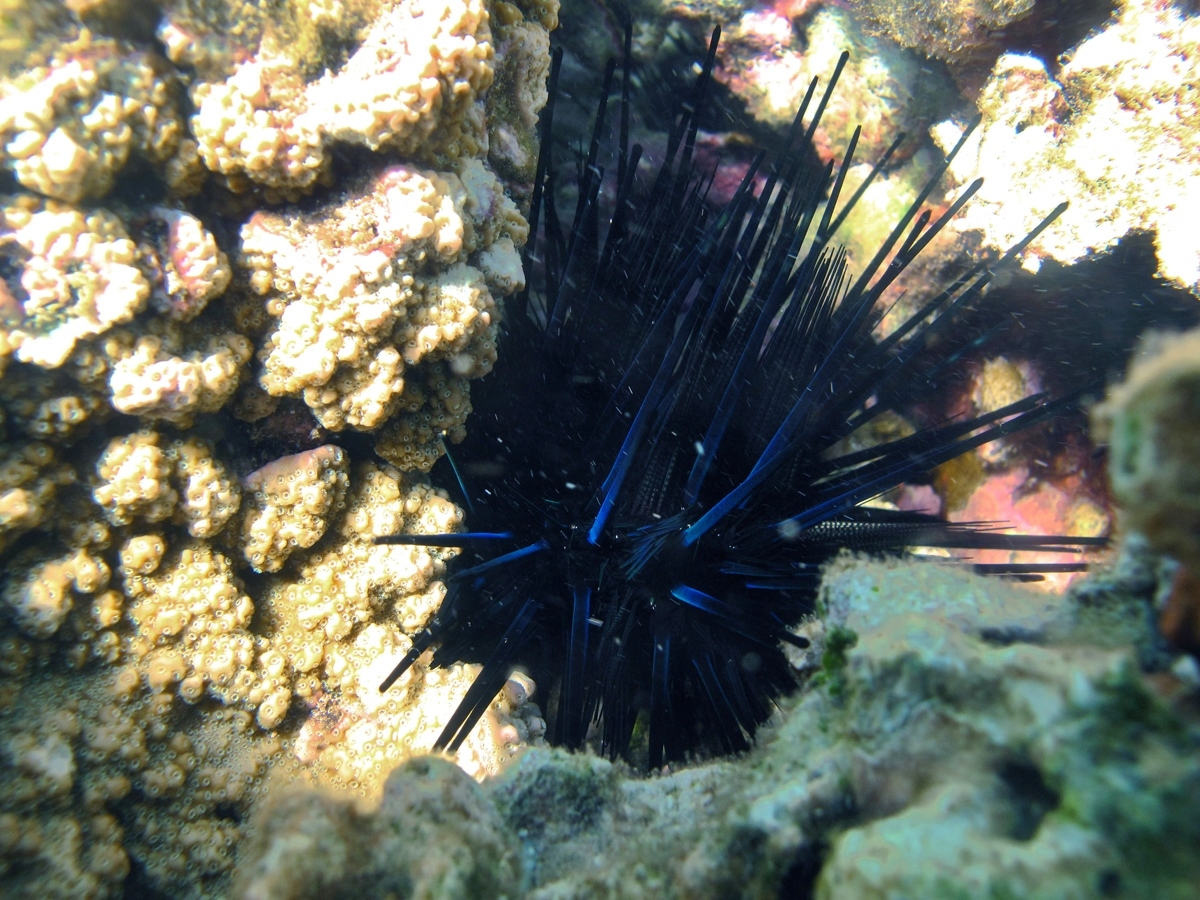
Adult.

== Feeding habits ==
The grazing preferences of Echinothrix diadema in Fiji were found to correlate with its preferred algae/seagrass species, Codium geppiorum. The grazing activity contributes to echinoid bioerosion.

== Distribution and habitat ==
This species can be found throughout all the Indo-Pacific coral reefs, from the Red Sea to Hawaii. It is a shallow waters species, living between the surface and 10m deep, but can eventually be found down to 70m.

== Behaviour ==
It is active at night, hiding in crevices, burrows, and under rocks during the day. Females generally choose low-lying locations, presumably so the tiny larvae can have better protection from predators.

It hosts commensal species like the shrimp Stegopontonia commensalis. Saron marmoratus stays close for protection, like many fish of the families Apogonidae (cardinalfish) and Centriscidae (razorfish and relatives).
