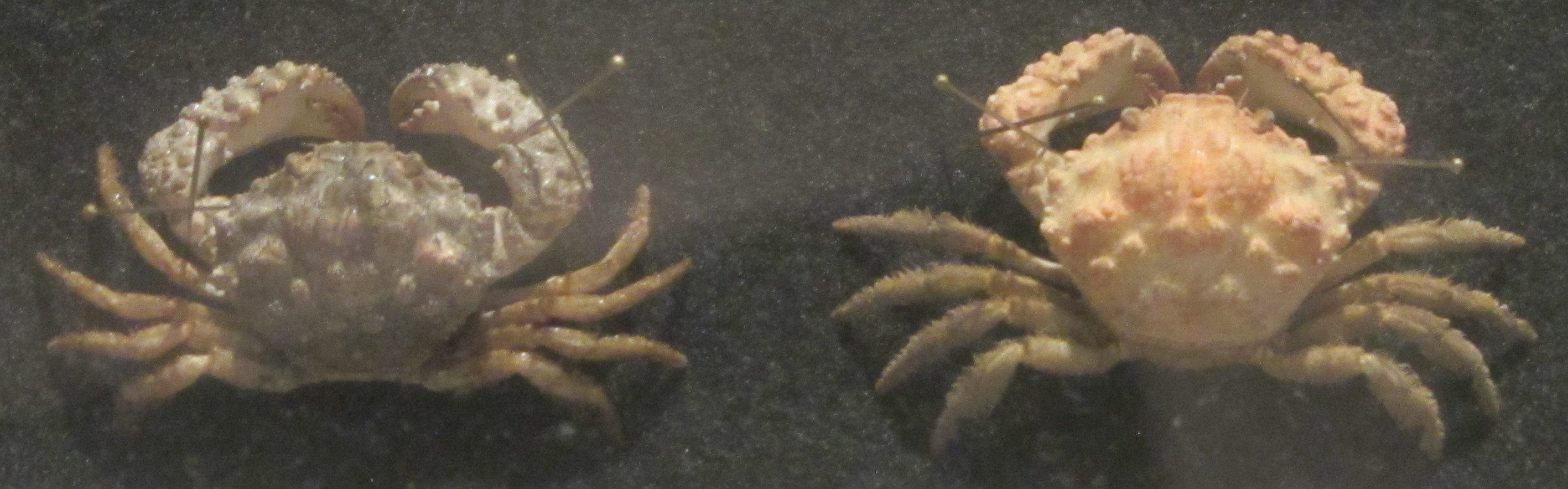
- Halimede tyche

Scientific classification
- Domain: Eukaryota
- Kingdom: Animalia
- Phylum: Arthropoda
- Class: Malacostraca
- Order: Decapoda
- Suborder: Pleocyemata
- Infraorder: Brachyura
- Family: Galenidae
- Genus: Halimede; De Haan, 1835

Synonyms
- Polycremnus Gerstaecker, 1856

= Halimede (crab) =

Genus of crabs

Halimede is a genus of crabs in the family Galenidae, with species occurring in Australia, Africa, and China.

== Species ==
- Halimede coppingeri Miers, 1884
- Halimede fragifer (De Haan, 1835)
- Halimede ochtodes (Herbst, 1783)
- Halimede tyche (Herbst, 1801)
