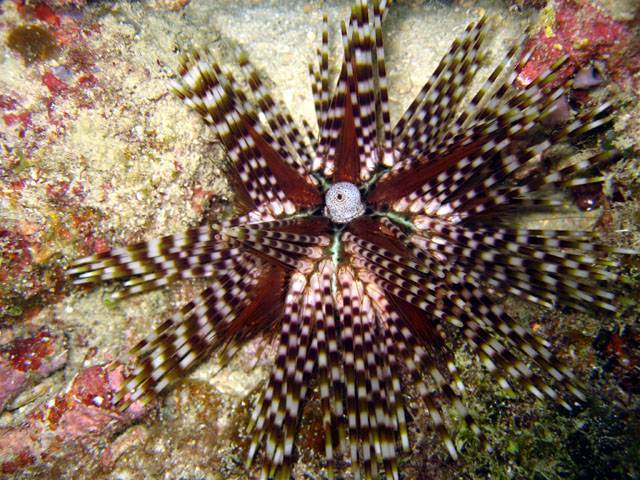

Scientific classification
- Kingdom: Animalia
- Phylum: Echinodermata
- Class: Echinoidea
- Order: Diadematoida
- Family: Diadematidae
- Genus: Echinothrix
- Species: E. calamaris

Binomial name
- Echinothrix calamaris Pallas, 1774

= Echinothrix calamaris =

Double spined urchin

Species of sea urchin

Echinothrix calamaris, known commonly as the banded sea urchin or double spined urchin among other vernacular names, is a species of sea urchin in the family Diadematidae.

== Description ==
The banded sea urchin has a slightly oval test (shell), reaching a diameter of about 5 cm. Like almost all the Diadematidae (but it is in Echinothrix calamaris that it is most obvious) it has two different sets of spines, short and slender closed spines which go from yellow to dark (through brown) in colour and can deliver a nasty sting, and longer and thicker spines that are often banded with light and dark colour (but sometimes all dark or all white), and reaching 10 to 15 cm in length. These radiolas can be blunt, and are hollow. The spines are grouped so as to let appear five naked zones on the central part of the test, in a star pattern (called "iridophores"): this pattern can be colored, often in blue. The anal papilla is big, more or less translucent and very obvious on the aborale face; it is generally whitish and speckled with black and white dots, circled by a ring of visual receptors that grant it rudimentary vision.

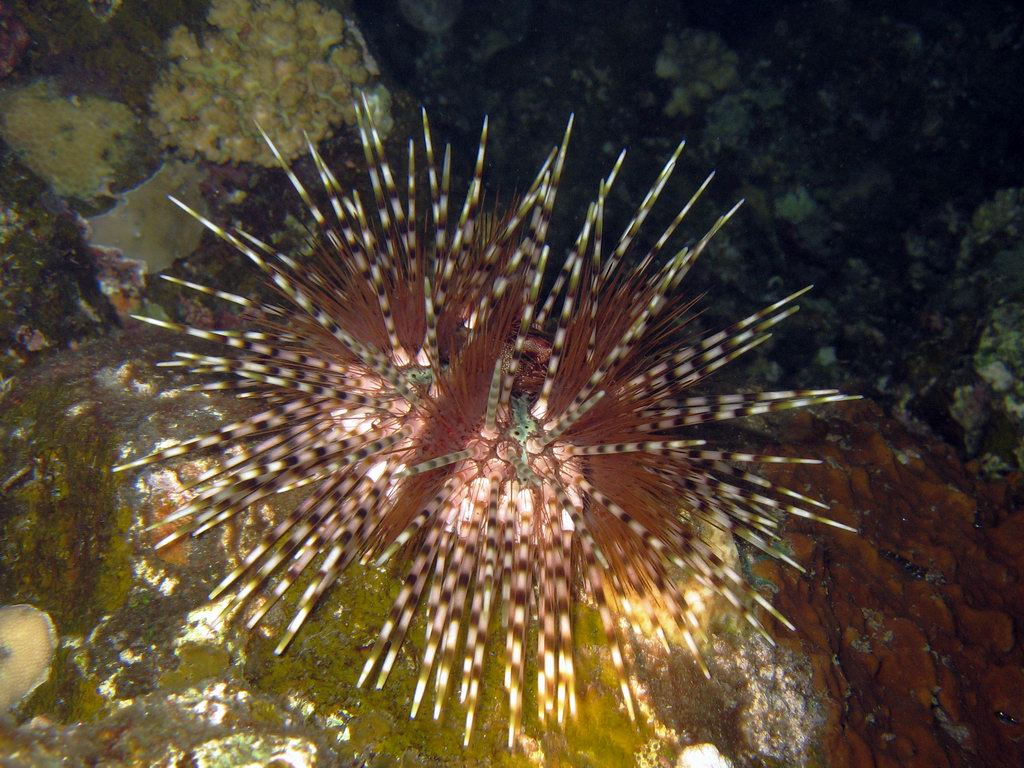
The most common form

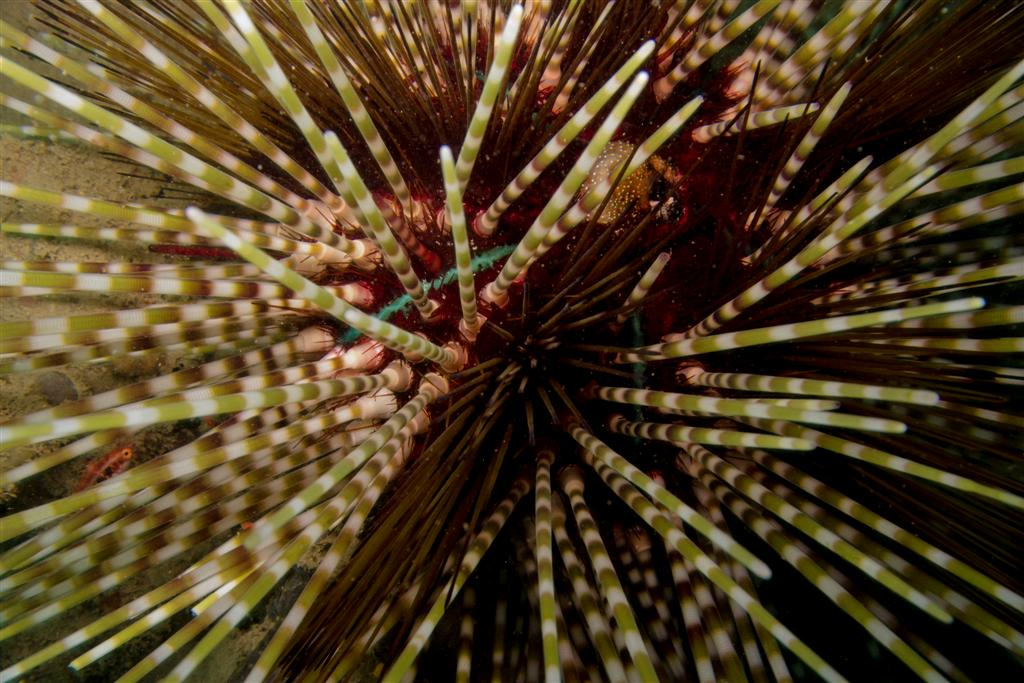
The two types of spines are very different

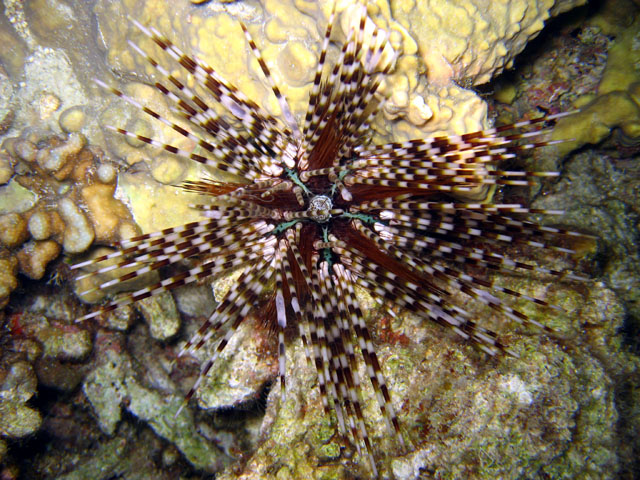
The 5-fold symmetry and blue iridophores are obvious on this picture

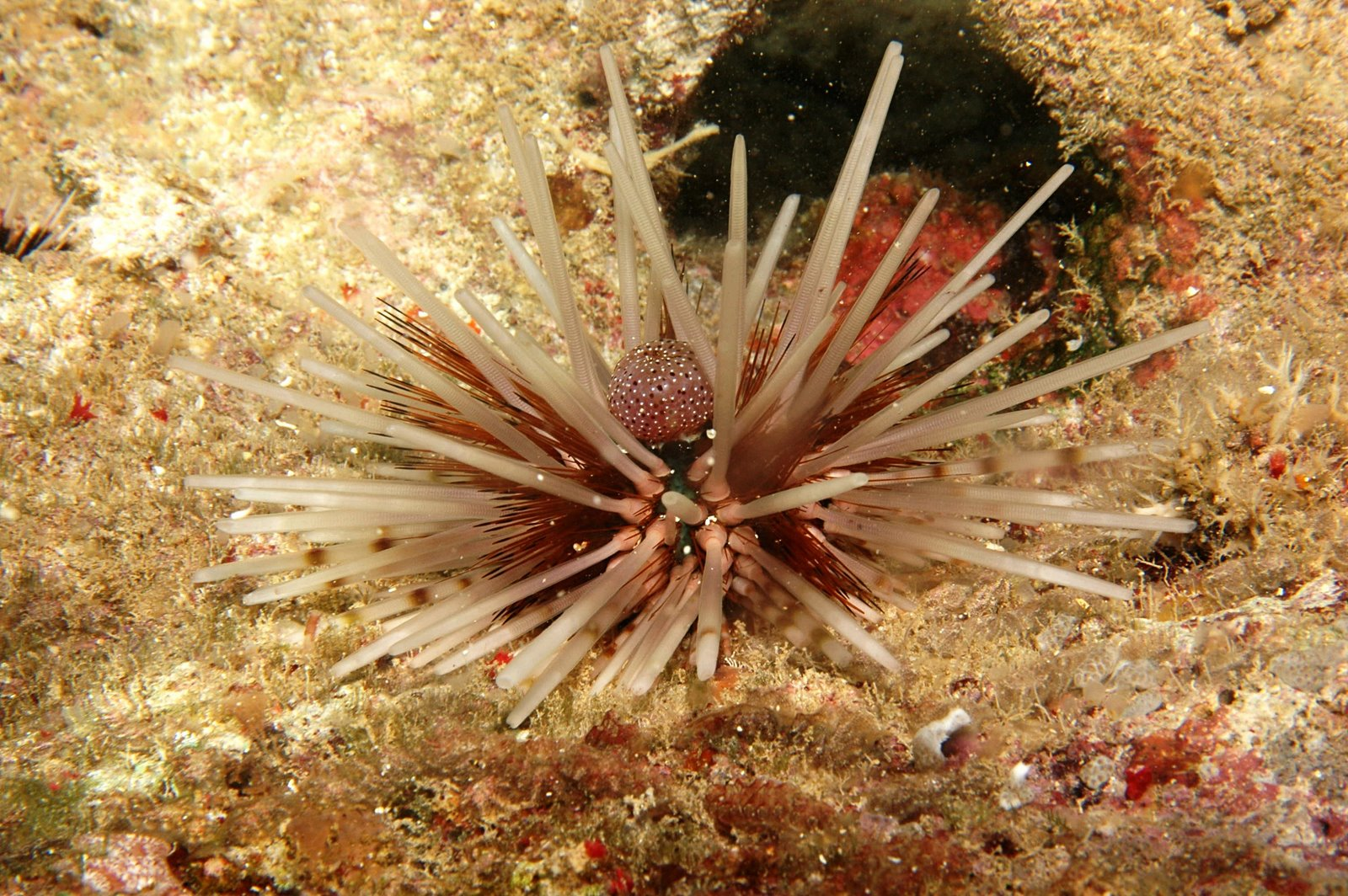
Specimen with white primary spines.

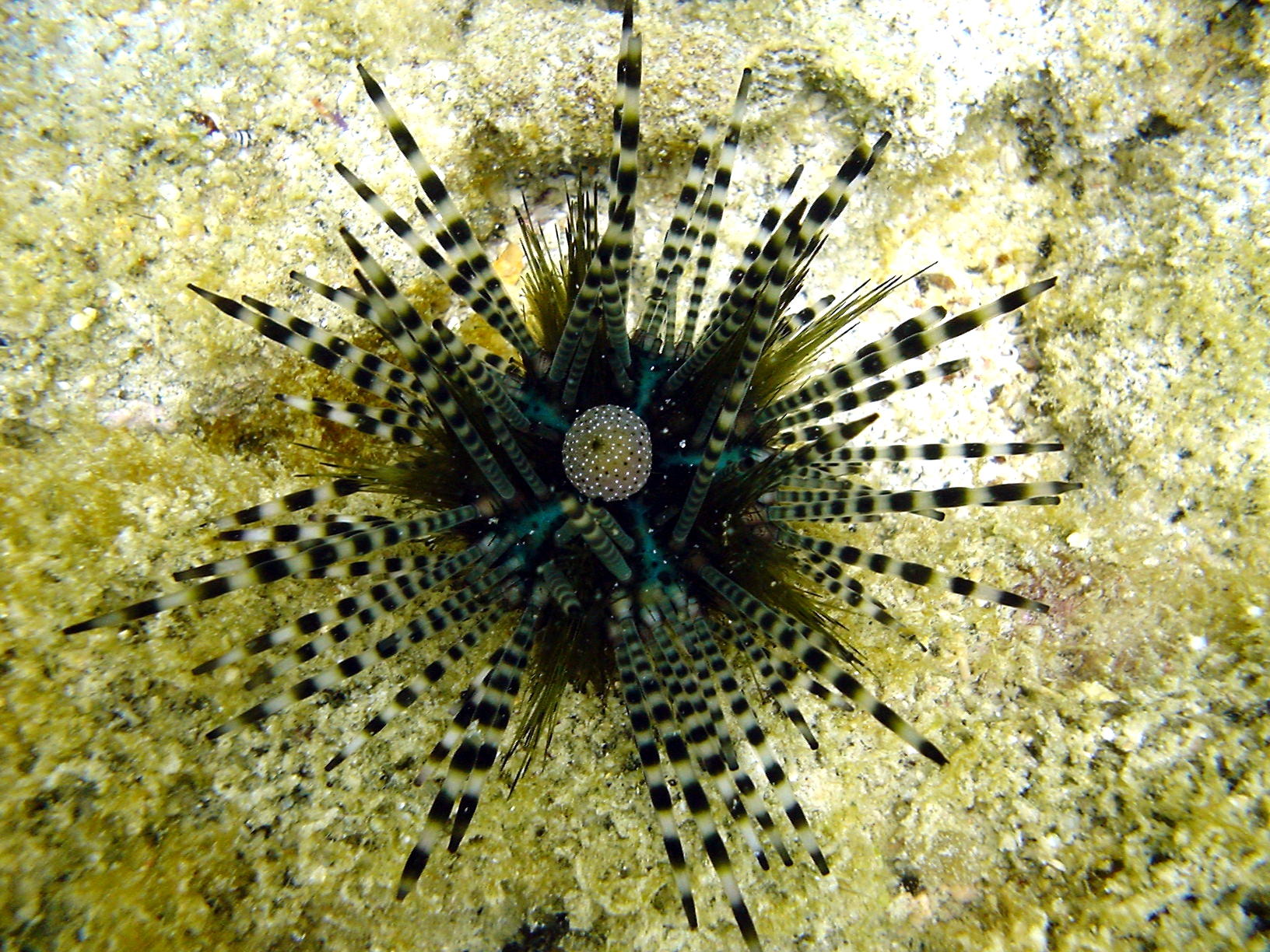
Darker form

In its darkest forms, it can be confused with its cousins Diadema setosum or Diadema savignyi (which can both keep banded radiola when adult); however, the latter is bigger, more uniformly black, has less discernible secondary radioles and is recognizable in five characteristic white points at the top of its test as well as in orange-colored circle around its anus. The most common confusion is with the very close species Echinothrix diadema, which can have banded spines when young. But E. diadema has a very small anal papilla, all black, and the spines have a blue sheen; the primary radiolas of E. calamaris are more fragile too, and can be crushed between two fingers (they are hollow), what is not the case for E. diadema.

=== Dark form ===
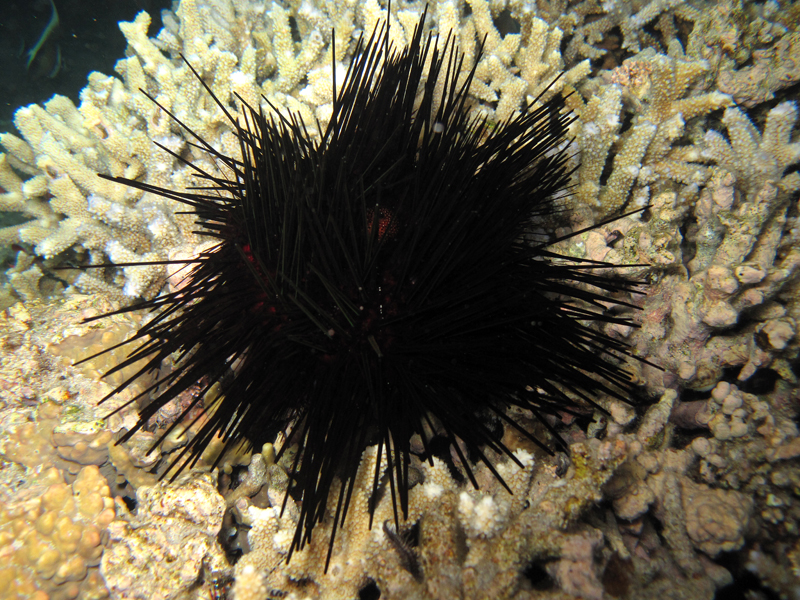
Dark E. calamaris at Réunion island

A dark form of this sea urchin is reported in Indian Ocean (Red Sea, Mascarene Islands, Seychelles, the Maldive Islands), with very dark radioles, often not banded, presenting generally a green sheen, and more or less reddish test (sometimes completely red, especially in the Red Sea). The anal papilla is black, more or less punctuated with white, but sometimes punctuated only with black which makes the distinction with Echinothrix diadema particularly difficult, as well as the absence of iridophores. The spines are also sharper and more solid, and cannot be crushed between two fingers. This could be a subspecies or even a separate species, especially as their ecological niche seems slightly différent.

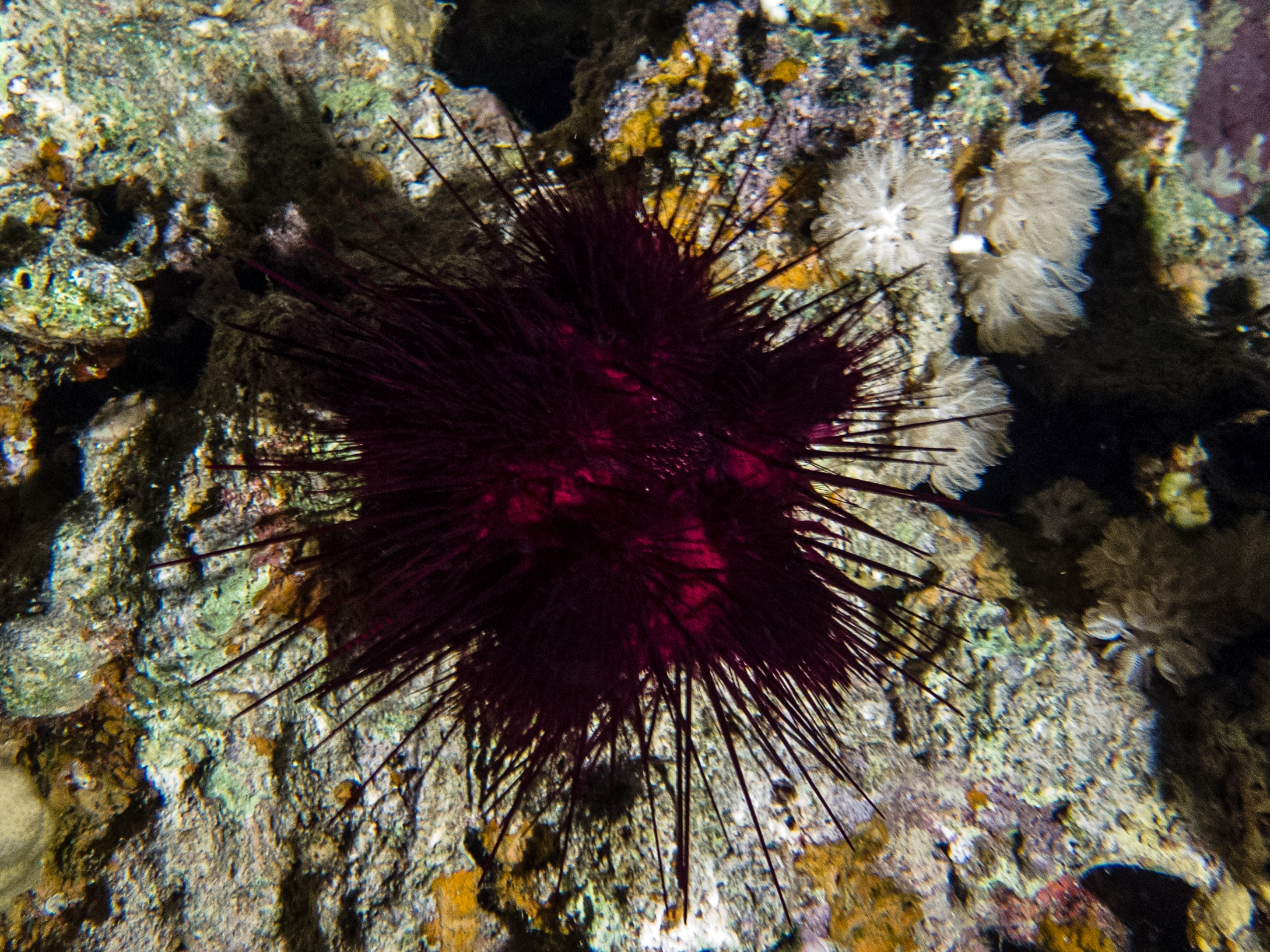
Dark-red specimen in Red Sea.

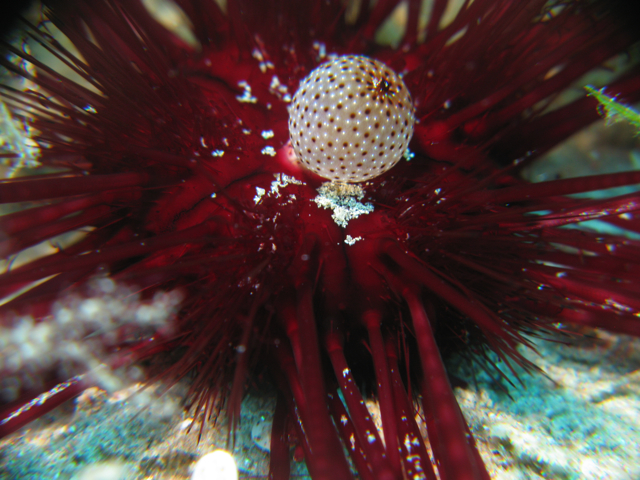
All red form in Egypt.

== Distribution and habitat ==
The banded sea urchin is widespread throughout the tropical waters of the Indo-Pacific region, from the eastern coast of Africa to French Polynesia, including Hawaii and the Red Sea.

It occurs from the surface to 70 metres (230 ft) depth and can be found in lagoons, external reef slopes and channels.

== Behavior ==
This sea urchin is active at night, hiding in crevices or under rocks during the day.

The thinner spines are venomous (but not dangerous).

== Miscellaneous notes ==
Many juvenile fish of the family Apogonidae (cardinal fish) may hide in the spines for protection.

In Hawaii, E. calamaris is often host to a symbiotic crab, Echinoecus pentagonus.
