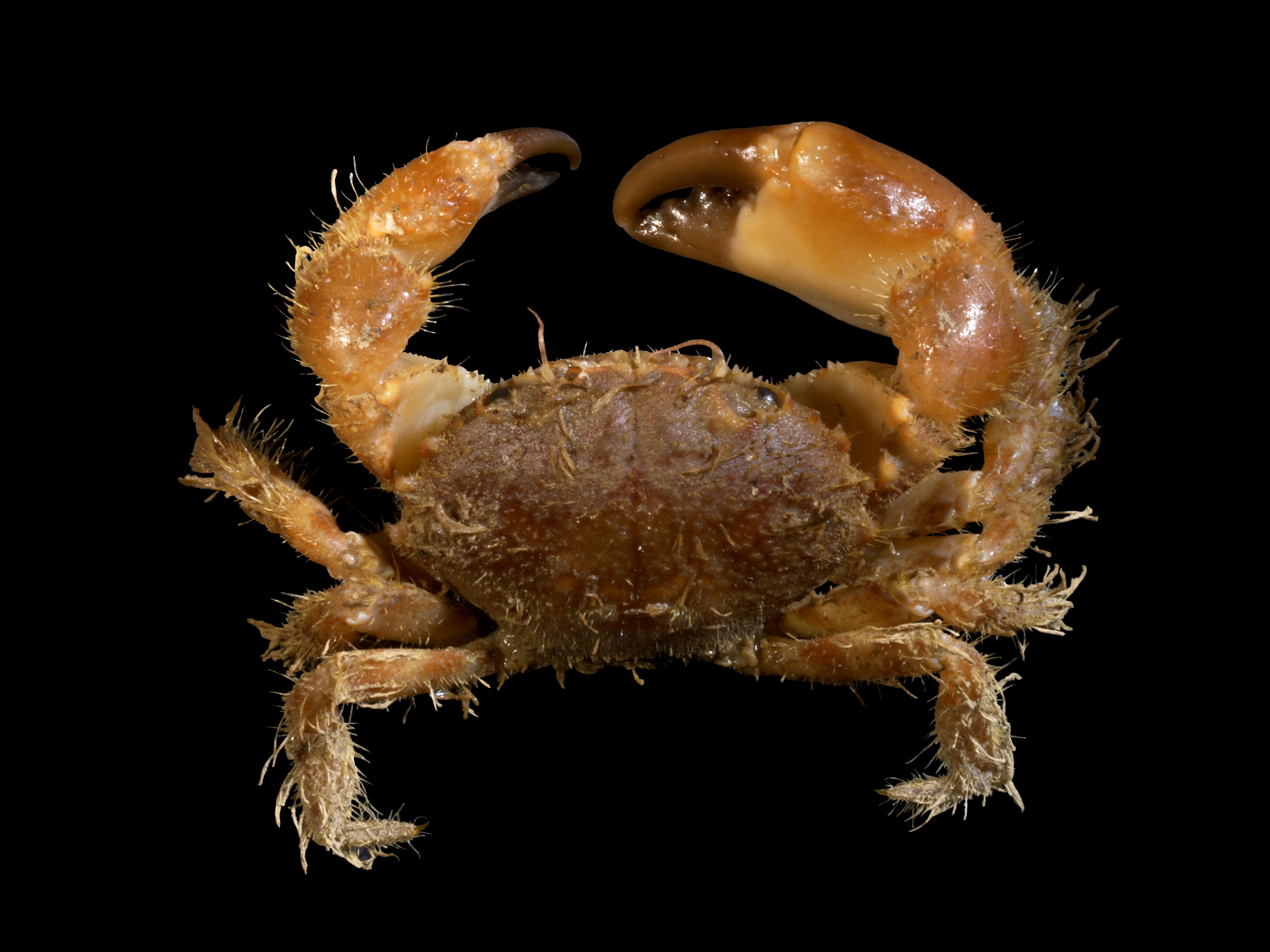

Scientific classification
- Kingdom: Animalia
- Phylum: Arthropoda
- Class: Malacostraca
- Order: Decapoda
- Suborder: Pleocyemata
- Infraorder: Brachyura
- Family: Pilumnidae
- Genus: Pilumnus
- Species: P. hirtellus

Binomial name
- Pilumnus hirtellus (Linnaeus, 1761)

Synonyms
- Cancer hirtellus Linnaeus, 1761

= Pilumnus hirtellus =

Species of crustacean

Pilumnus hirtellus, the bristly crab or hairy crab, is a species of European crab. It is less than 1 inch (25 mm) long and covered in hair. It lives in shallow water and feeds on carrion.

== Description ==
Pilumnus hirtellus is a small crab, with a carapace up to 28 millimetres (1.1 in) wide and 20 millimetres (0.79 in) long. The carapace and legs are reddish brown or purple, with the inner surfaces of the legs orange or paler. Both the carapace and the walking legs have a dense covering of setae. The first pair of legs bear large chelae (claws), of which one, usually the right claw, is larger than the other, and the fingers of both claws are brown. The claws are smaller and less hairy in females. Young crabs are less than 5 millimetres (0.20 in) in size, and are chalky white all over. The front edge of the carapace has five teeth on either side, with the first two being smaller than the others.

== Distribution ==
Pilumnus hirtellus is found from the North Sea to Morocco, the Azores, Madeira, the Canary Islands and the Cape Verde Islands, as well as in the Mediterranean and Black Seas. It is limited by the occurrence of hard frosts, violent storms and pollution. Pilumnus hirtellus is concentrated in regions near the Mediterranean like Sado River estuary, Portugal.

== Relatives ==
Pilumnus hirtellus is closely related to Pilumnus spinifer, and intermediates have been reported, although in other locations, the two species have been observed living in sympatry without any intermediates being observed.

== Ecology ==
Pilumnus hirtellus lives at depths of up to 80 metres (260 ft), preferring areas shallower than 10 metres (33 ft). It can be found on various substrates, including muddy, sandy and rocky bottoms, under stones and even among the holdfasts of seaweeds. In the Black Sea, this species prefers stony areas with abundant algae and mussels. The diet consists mainly of carrion.

== Life cycle ==
Between April and August, females may carry up to 4000 eggs. These are released between May and September, as planktonic zoea larvae, which develop into megalopa larvae before maturing into the adult form.
