= List of the Cenozoic life of North Carolina =

This list of the Cenozoic life of North Carolina contains the various prehistoric life-forms whose fossilized remains have been reported from within the US state of North Carolina and are between 66 million and 10,000 years of age.

== A ==
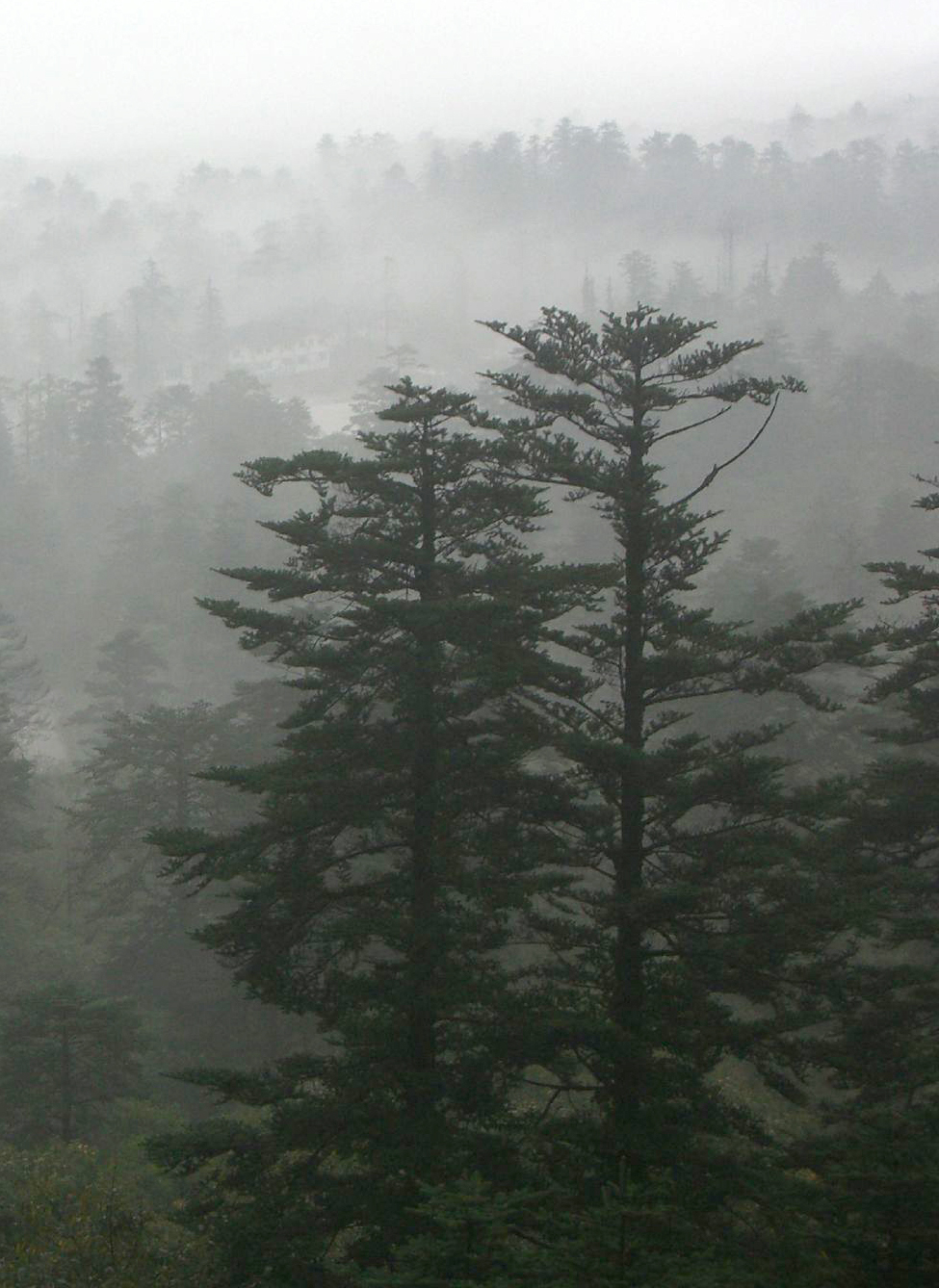
- Living Abies, or fir trees
  Abies
- †Abra
  - †Abra aequalis
  - †Abra subreflexa
- Acanthocybium
  - †Acanthocybium solandri
- †Acantholambrus
  - †Acantholambrus baumi
- †Acarinina
  - †Acarinina perclara
- †Achrochordiella – type locality for genus
  - †Achrochordiella vokesi – type locality for species
- Acipenser
  - †Acipenser oxyrhynchus – or unidentified comparable form
- Acrosterigma
- Acteocina
  - †Acteocina canaliculata
  - †Acteocina candei
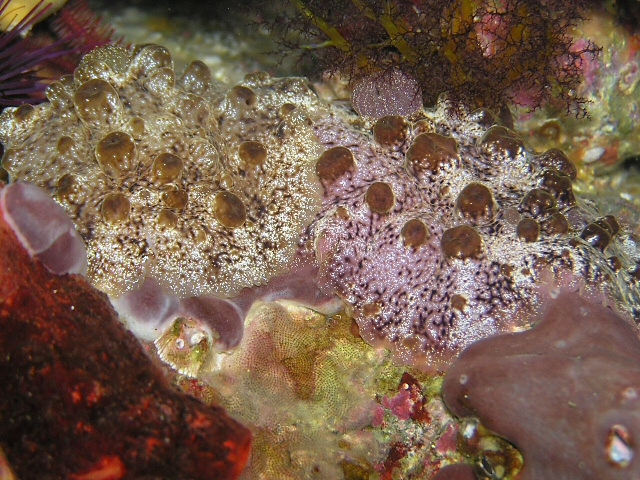
- A living Actinocyclus sea slug
  †Actinocyclus
  - †Actinocyclus elipticus
  - †Actinocyclus ingens
  - †Actinocyclus octonarius
  - †Actinocyclus tenellus
- Actinocythereis
  - †Actinocythereis captionis
  - †Actinocythereis dawsoni
  - †Actinocythereis gosportensis
  - †Actinocythereis marylandica
  - †Actinocythereis mundorffi
- †Actinoptychus
  - †Actinoptychus marylandicus
  - †Actinoptychus senarius
  - †Actinoptychus virginicus
- †Acuticythereis
  - †Acuticythereis lavissima
- Aequipecten
  - †Aequipecten eboerus
  - †Aequipecten eboreus
- Aesopus
  - †Aesopus gardnerae
  - †Aesopus stearnsii
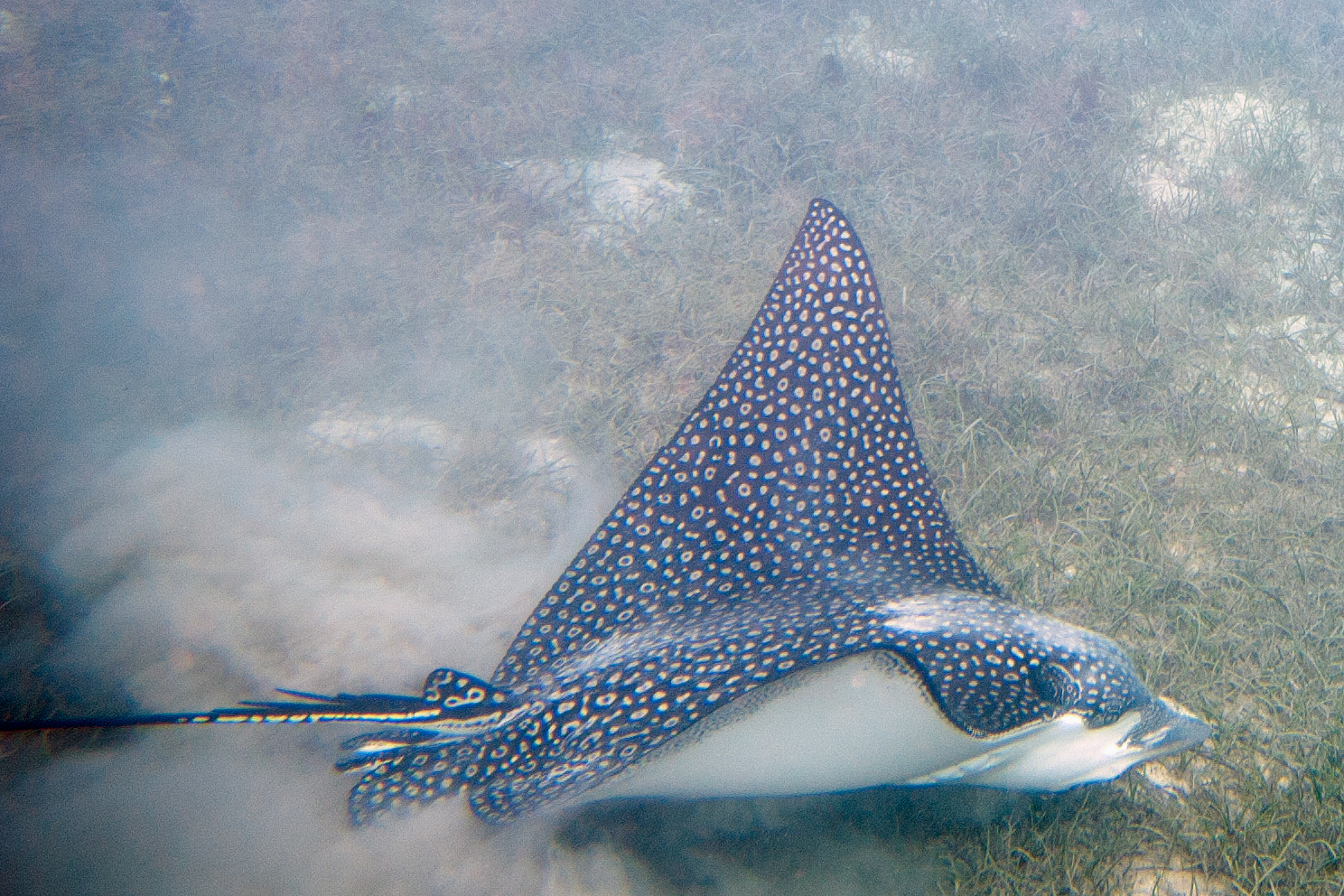
- A living Aetobatus eagle ray
  Aetobatus
- Agaronia
- Agassizia
  - †Agassizia scrobiculata
  - †Agassizia wilmingtonensis
  - †Agassizia wilmingtonica
- Agatrix
  - †Agatrix mississippiensis
- †Akleistostoma
  - †Akleistostoma carolinensis
  - †Akleistostoma pilsbryi – type locality for species
- Alabamina
  - †Alabamina wilcoxensis
- †Albertella
  - †Albertella aberta
- †Albertocetus – type locality for genus
  - †Albertocetus meffordorum – type locality for species
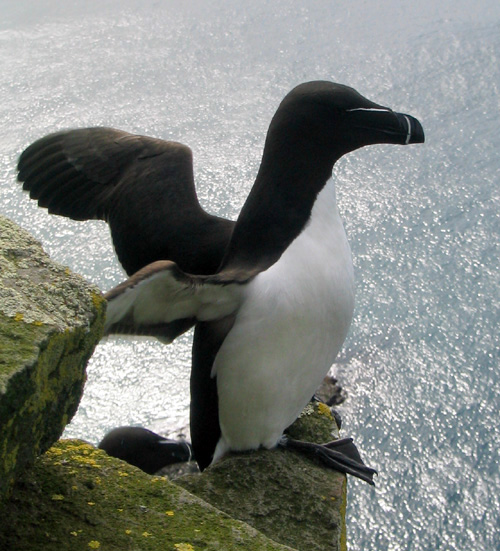
- A living Alca, or razorbill
  Alca
  - †Alca ausonia
  - †Alca carolinensis – type locality for species
  - †Alca grandis – type locality for species
  - †Alca minor – type locality for species
  - †Alca olsoni – type locality for species
  - †Alca torda – or unidentified related form
- Aligena
  - †Aligena rhomboidea
  - †Aligena striata
- Alnus
- Alopias
  - †Alopias superciliosus
  - †Alopias vulpinus
- Alosa
  - †Alosa sapidissima – or unidentified comparable form
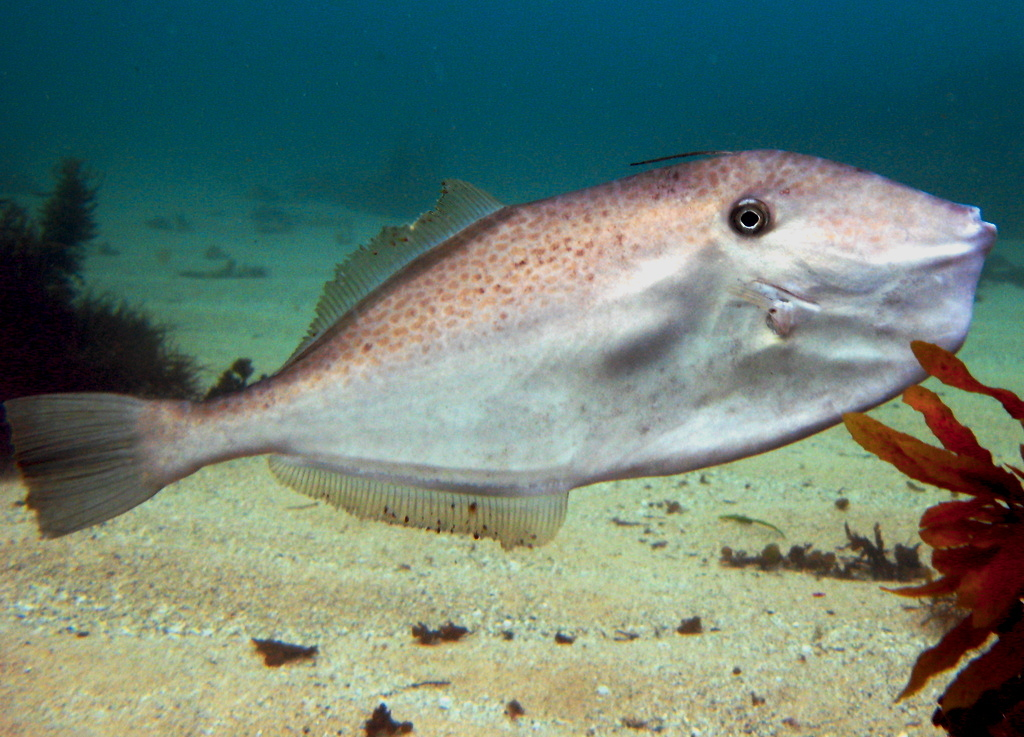
- A living Aluterus filefish
  Aluterus
- †Ambrosia
- Americardia
  - †Americardia media
- Ammodytes
  - †Ammodytes hexapterus
- Amusium
  - †Amusium mortoni
- †Anabernicula
  - †Anabernicula minuscula – or unidentified comparable form
- Anachis
  - †Anachis aurora
  - †Anachis avara
  - †Anachis milleri
  - †Anachis styliola
- Anadara
  - †Anadara aequicostata
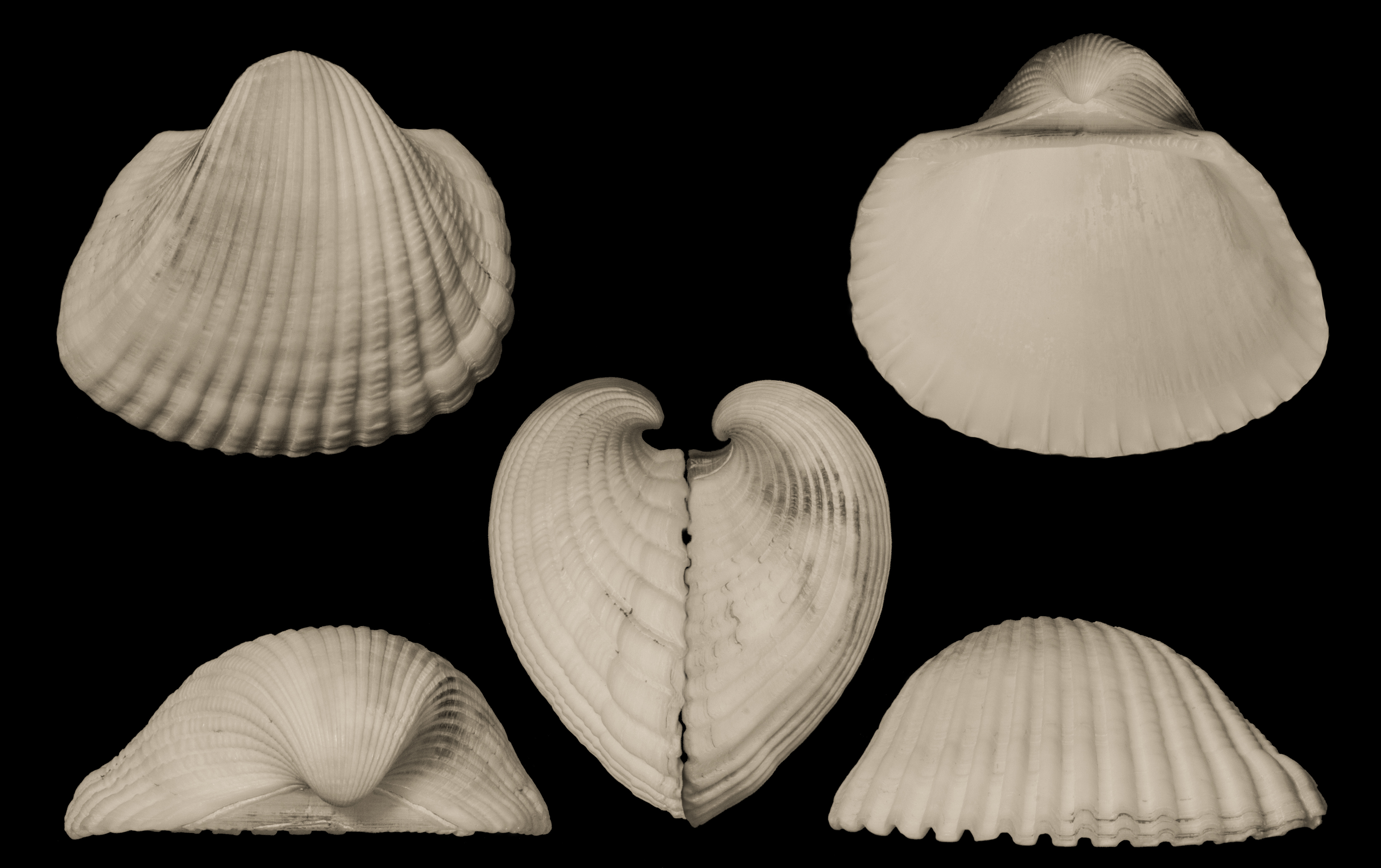
  - Shell in multiple views of an Anadara brasiliana, or incongruous ark clam
    †Anadara brasiliana
  - †Anadara callicestosa
  - †Anadara floridana
  - †Anadara lienosa
  - †Anadara magnoliana
  - †Anadara ovalis
  - †Anadara rustica
  - †Anadara scalaris
  - †Anadara silverdalensis – type locality for species
  - †Anadara transversa
- Anas
  - †Anas acuta
  - †Anas americana
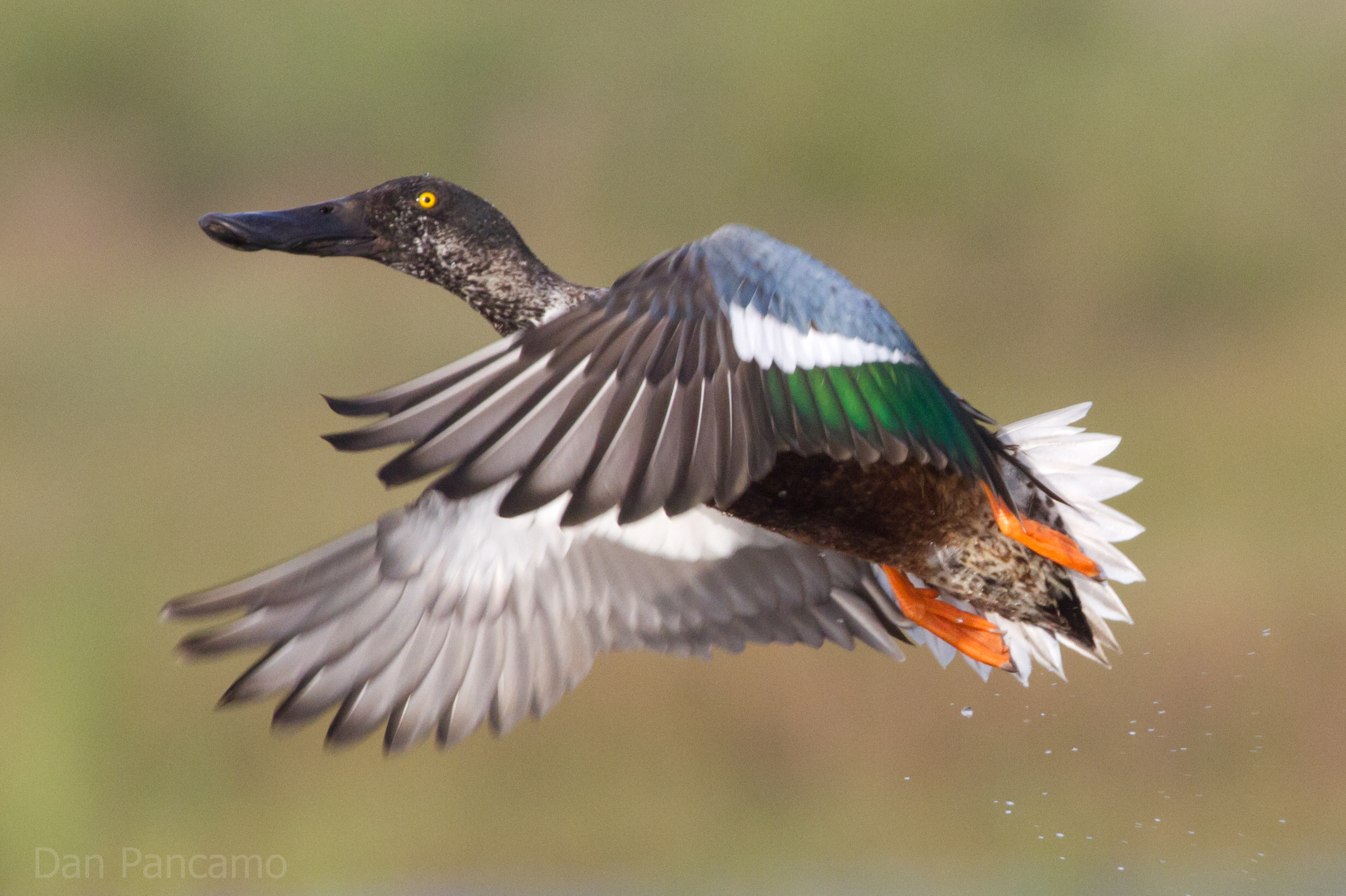
  - A living Spatula clypeata, or northern shoveler
    †Anas clypeata
  - †Anas discors
  - †Anas platyrhynchos
- †Anaulus
  - †Anaulus mediterraneus
- Anchistrocheles
  - †Anchistrocheles c informal
- Angulogerina
  - †Angulogerina occidentalis
- Angulus
  - †Angulus agilis
  - †Angulus texanus
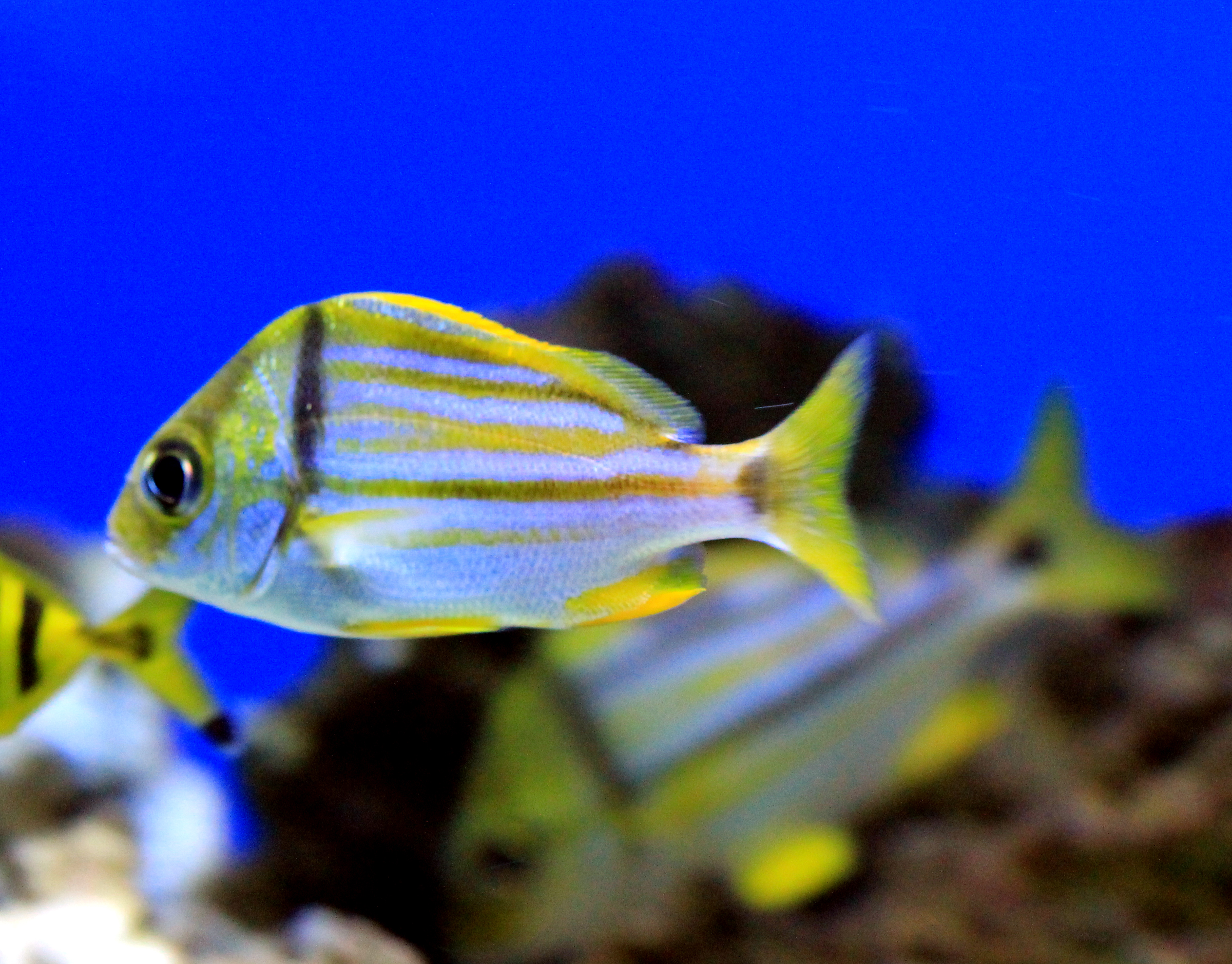
- A living Anisotremus grunt
  Anisotremus
- †Annellus
  - †Annellus californicus
- Anodontia
  - †Anodontia alba
- Anomia
  - †Anomia filamentosa
  - †Anomia ruffini
  - †Anomia simplex
- †Anomotodon
  - †Anomotodon cravenensis – type locality for species
  - †Anomotodon nova
- †Anoplonassa
- Anser
  - †Anser arizonae – or unidentified comparable form
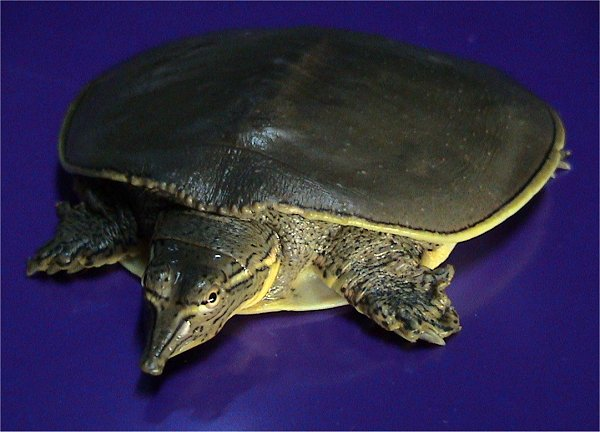
- A living Apalone softshell turtle
  Apalone – or unidentified comparable form
- †Apiocyphraea
- Aprionodon
  - †Aprionodon acuaris
- †Aprixokogia – type locality for genus
  - †Aprixokogia kelloggi – type locality for species
- †Araeodelphis
  - †Araeodelphis natator – or unidentified comparable form
- †Araloselachus
  - †Araloselachus cuspidata
- Arbacia
  - †Arbacia improcera
  - †Arbacia sloani – or unidentified comparable form
- Arca
  - †Arca cancellata – tentative report
- †Archimediella
  - †Archimediella duplinensis
- Architectonica
  - †Architectonica fungina
- †Archosargus
  - †Archosargus probatocephalus – or unidentified comparable form
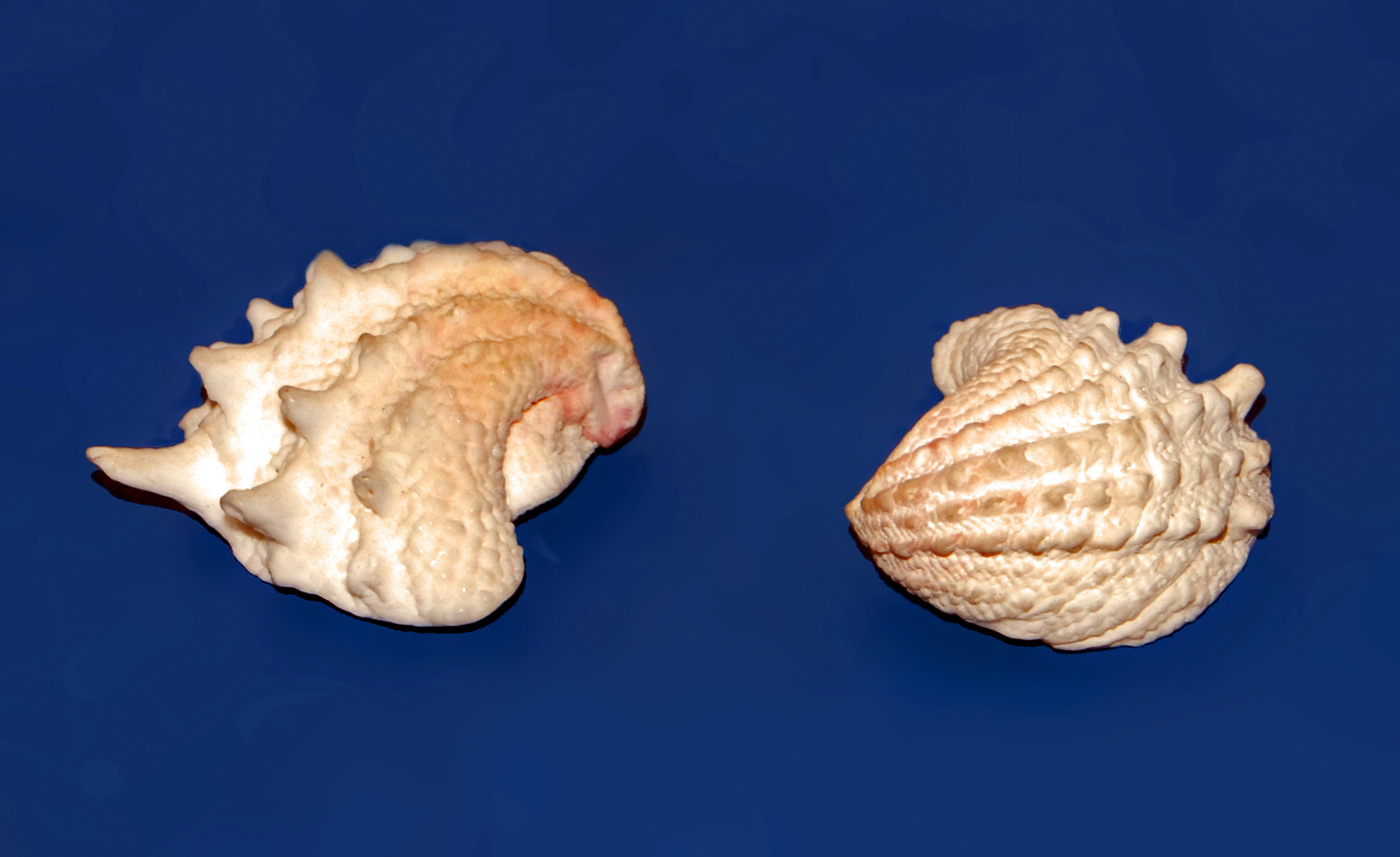
- Shells of Arcinella jewel box clams
  Arcinella
  - †Arcinella cornuta
- Arcopsis
  - †Arcopsis adamsi
- Ardea
  - †Ardea cinerea – or unidentified related form
- Argopecten
  - †Argopecten erboreus
  - †Argopecten gibbus
  - †Argopecten irradians
- Argyrotheca
  - †Argyrotheca quadrata – type locality for species
- Arossia
  - †Arossia aurae
  - †Arossia glyptopoma
- †Artemisia
- Artena
  - †Artena lamellacea – type locality for species
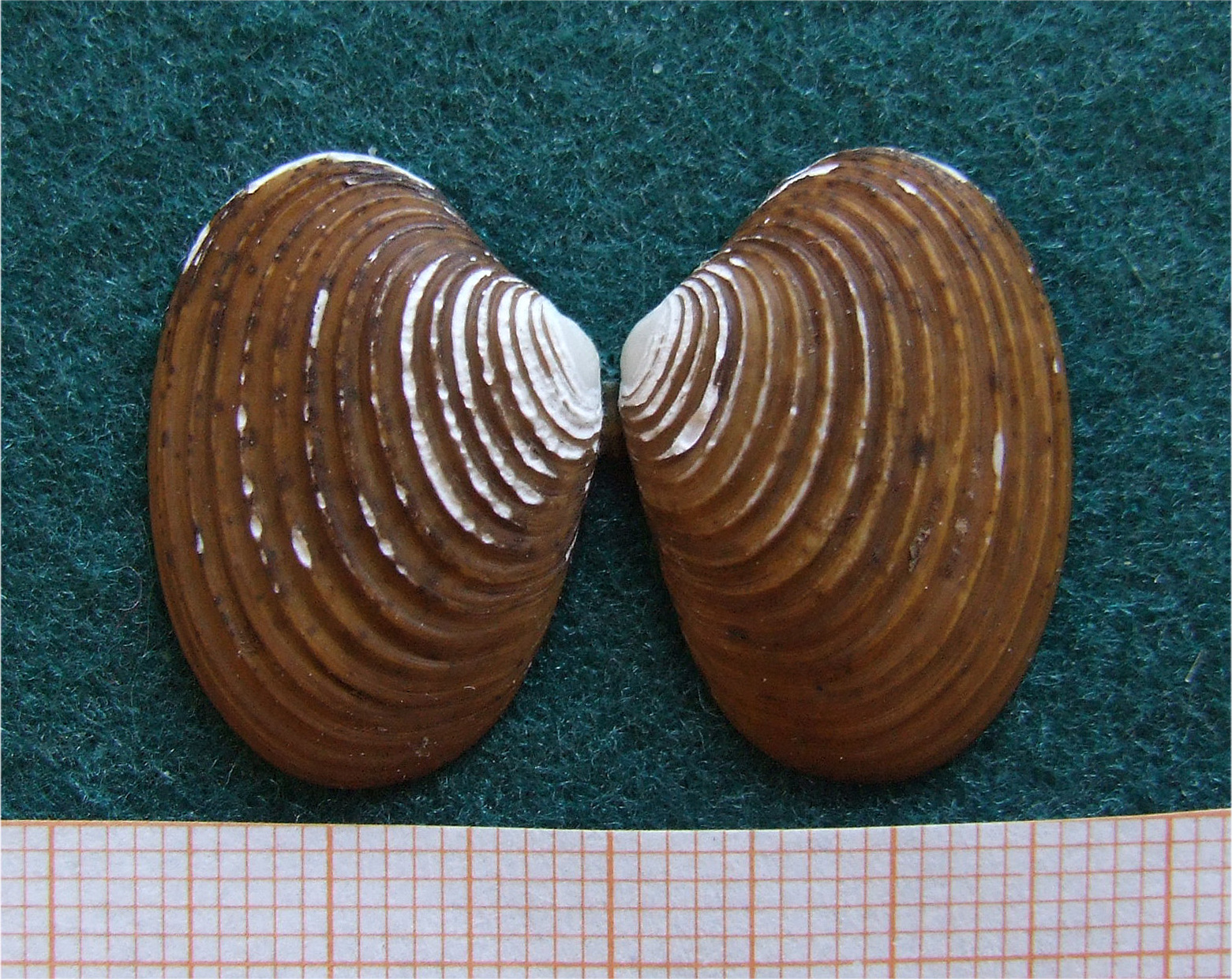
- Shell of a modern Astarte bivalve
  Astarte
  - †Astarte berryi
  - †Astarte claytonrayi
  - †Astarte concentrica
  - †Astarte crenata
  - †Astarte onslowensis – type locality for species
  - †Astarte rappahannockensis
  - †Astarte symmetrica
  - †Astarte thisphila – tentative report
  - †Astarte undulata
- †Asteromphalus
  - †Asteromphalus robustus
- †Astroscopus
- Astyris
  - †Astyris lunata
- Athleta
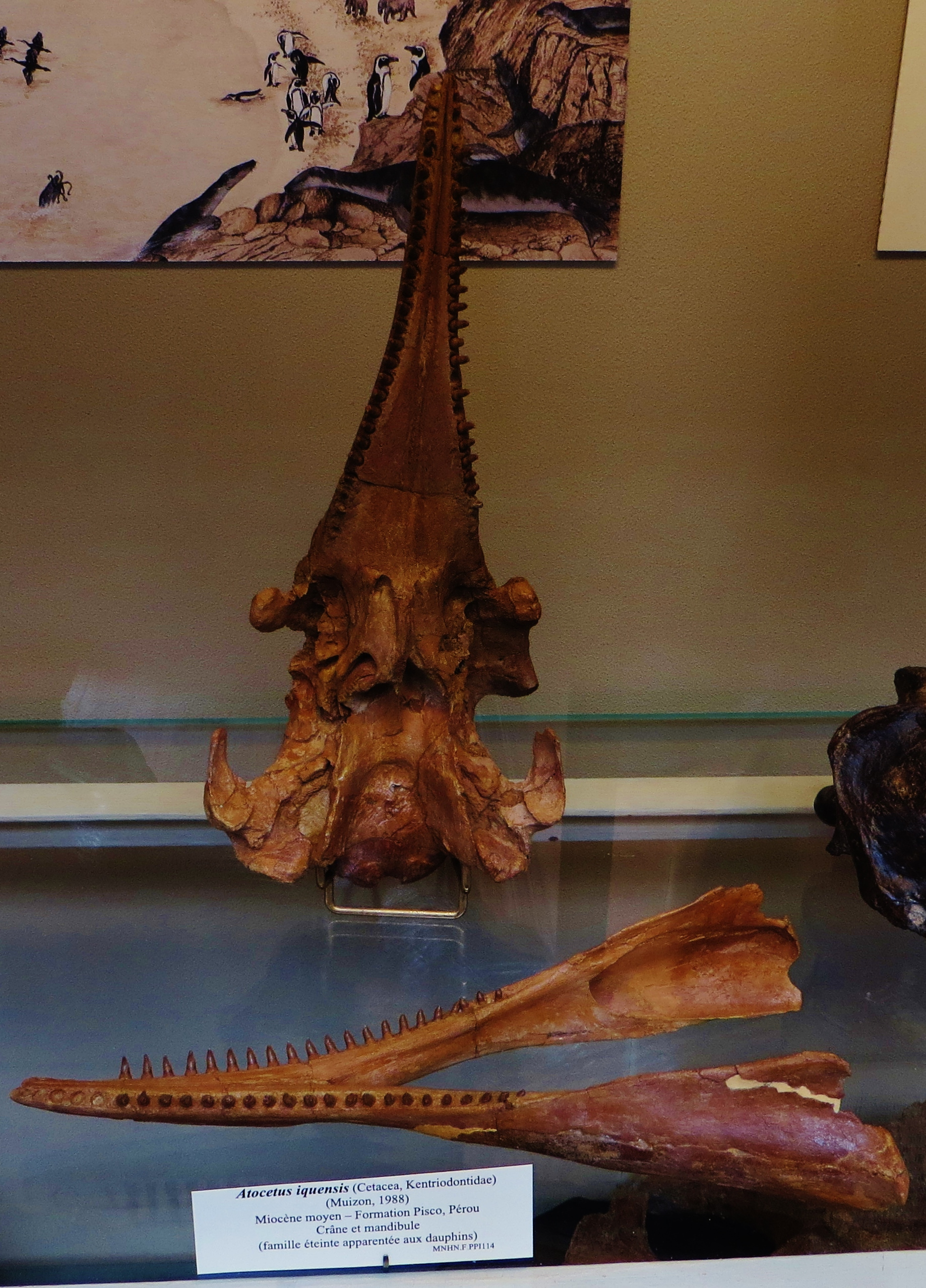
- Fossilized skull of the Miocene dolphin Atocetus
  †Atocetus – or unidentified related form
- Atrina
- †Aturia
  - †Aturia alabamensis
- Aurila
  - †Aurila laevicula
- †Auroracetus – type locality for genus
  - †Auroracetus bakerae – type locality for species
- Auxis
- Axelella
  - †Axelella vokesae – type locality for species
- Aythya
  - †Aythya affinis – or unidentified related form

== B ==
- †Bactronella
  - †Bactronella incrustans – type locality for species
  - †Bactronella womblei – type locality for species
- Bagre
- Bairdia
- Bairdoppilata
  - †Bairdoppilata triangulata
- Balaena
- Balaenoptera
  - †Balaenoptera acutorostrata
  - †Balaenoptera borealina
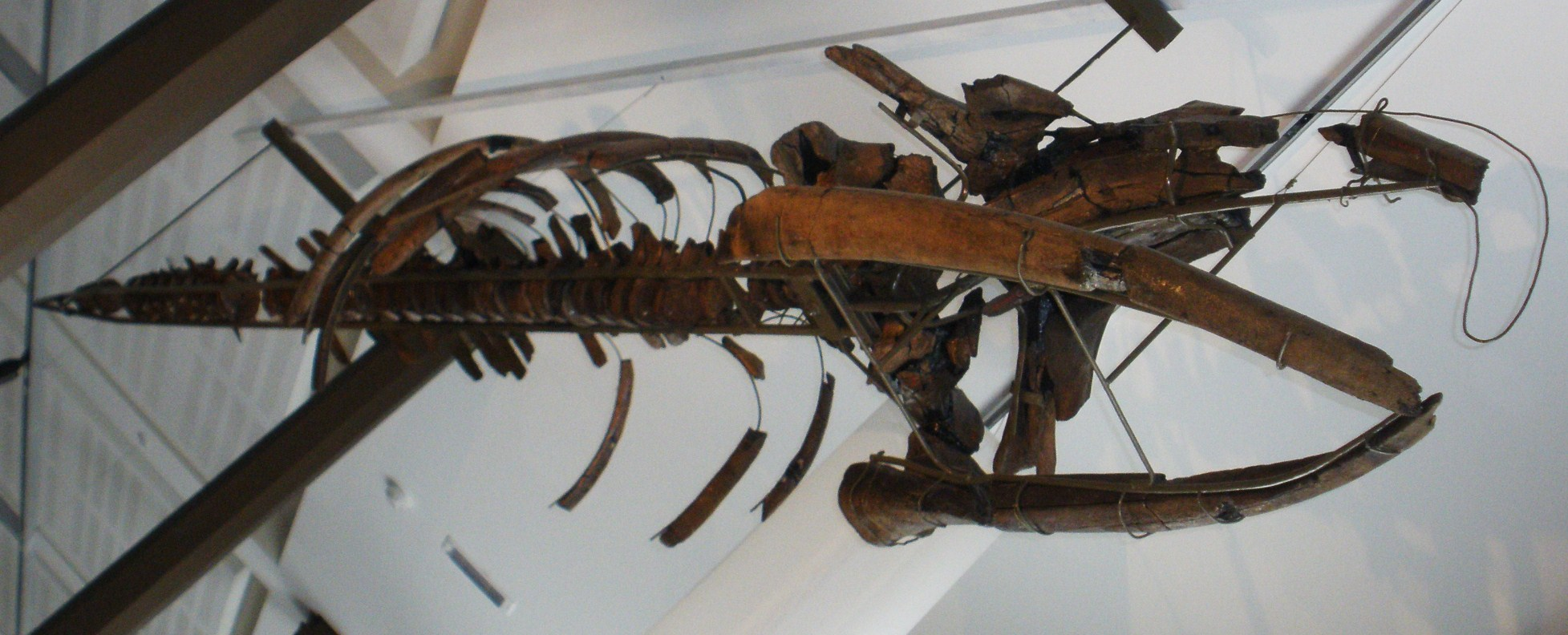
- Mounted fossilized skeleton of the Pliocene whale Balaenula
  †Balaenula
- Balanophyllia
- Balanus
  - †Balanus halosydne
- Balcis
  - †Balcis beufortensis
  - †Balcis biconica
- Balearica – tentative report
- Barbatia
  - †Barbatia carolinensis
  - †Barbatia cuculloides – or unidentified comparable form
- Barnea
  - †Barnea arcuata
  - †Barnea costata
- †Basilotritus
  - †Basilotritus wardii – type locality for species
- Basterotia
  - †Basterotia carolina
  - †Basterotia elliptica
- Bathytormus
  - †Bathytormus flexurus – or unidentified comparable form
  - †Bathytormus protexta
- Bellucina
  - †Bellucina waccamawensis
- †Belosaepia
- Bensonocythere
  - †Bensonocythere blackwelderi
  - †Bensonocythere bradyi
  - †Bensonocythere calverti
  - †Bensonocythere gouldensis
  - †Bensonocythere m informal
  - †Bensonocythere oo informal
  - †Bensonocythere pp informal
  - †Bensonocythere qq informal
  - †Bensonocythere ricespitensis
  - †Bensonocythere rr informal
  - †Bensonocythere rugosa
  - †Bensonocythere trapezoidalis
  - †Bensonocythere whitei
- Betula
- Bicorbula
  - †Bicorbula idonea
- †Biddulphia
  - †Biddulphia aurita
  - †Biddulphia tuomeyii
- Bittium
  - †Bittium podagrinum
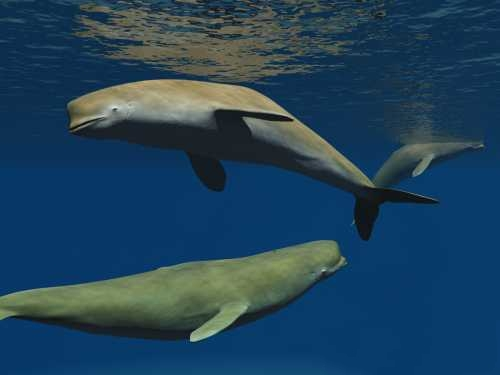
- Life restoration of the Pliocene toothed whale Bohaskaia
  †Bohaskaia
  - †Bohaskaia monodontoides
- Bolivina
  - †Bolivina calvertensis
  - †Bolivina floridana
  - †Bolivina paula
  - †Bolivina plicatella
  - †Bolivina pungoensis
- †Bolivinopsis
  - †Bolivinopsis fairhavenensis
- Boonea
  - †Boonea impressa
  - †Boonea seminuda
- †Bootherium
  - †Bootherium bombifrons
- Boreotrophon – report made of unidentified related form or using admittedly obsolete nomenclature
  - †Boreotrophon tetricus
- Bornia
  - †Bornia bladenensis
  - †Bornia longipes
  - †Bornia triangula
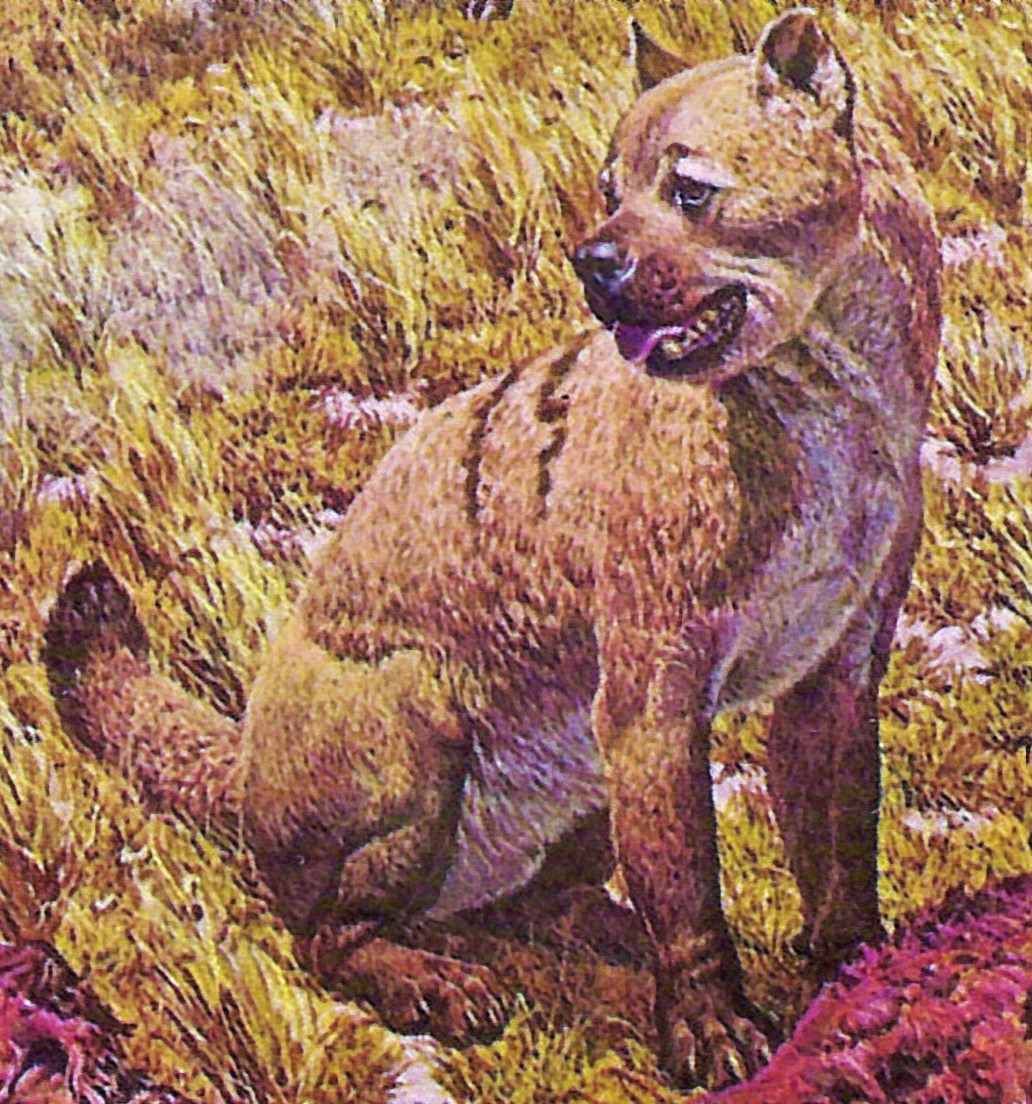
- Restoration of two of the Miocene-Pliocene bone-crushing dog genus Borophagus preying on a camel. Jay Matternes (1964).
  †Borophagus
  - †Borophagus dudleyi – or unidentified comparable form
  - †Borophagus orc – or unidentified comparable form
- Bostrycapulus
  - †Bostrycapulus aculeatus
- Botrychium
  - †Botrychium dissectum – or unidentified comparable form
- †Botryococcus
- Brachidontes
- Branta
  - †Branta bernicla – or unidentified related form
- †Brasenia
- Brizalina
- Brotula
  - †Brotula barbata
- Buccella
  - †Buccella frigida
- †Bucella
  - †Bucella mansfieldi – or unidentified comparable form
- Bucephala
  - †Bucephala albeola – or unidentified related form
  - †Bucephala clangula – or unidentified related form
- Bulimina
  - †Bulimina elongata
- Buliminella
  - †Buliminella elegantissima
- †Bulliminella
  - †Bulliminella elegantissima
- Bulweria – tentative report
- †Burnhamia
  - †Burnhamia daviesi
- Busycon
  - †Busycon adversarius
  - †Busycon amoenum
  - †Busycon aruanum
  - †Busycon bladenense
  - †Busycon carica
  - †Busycon chowanense
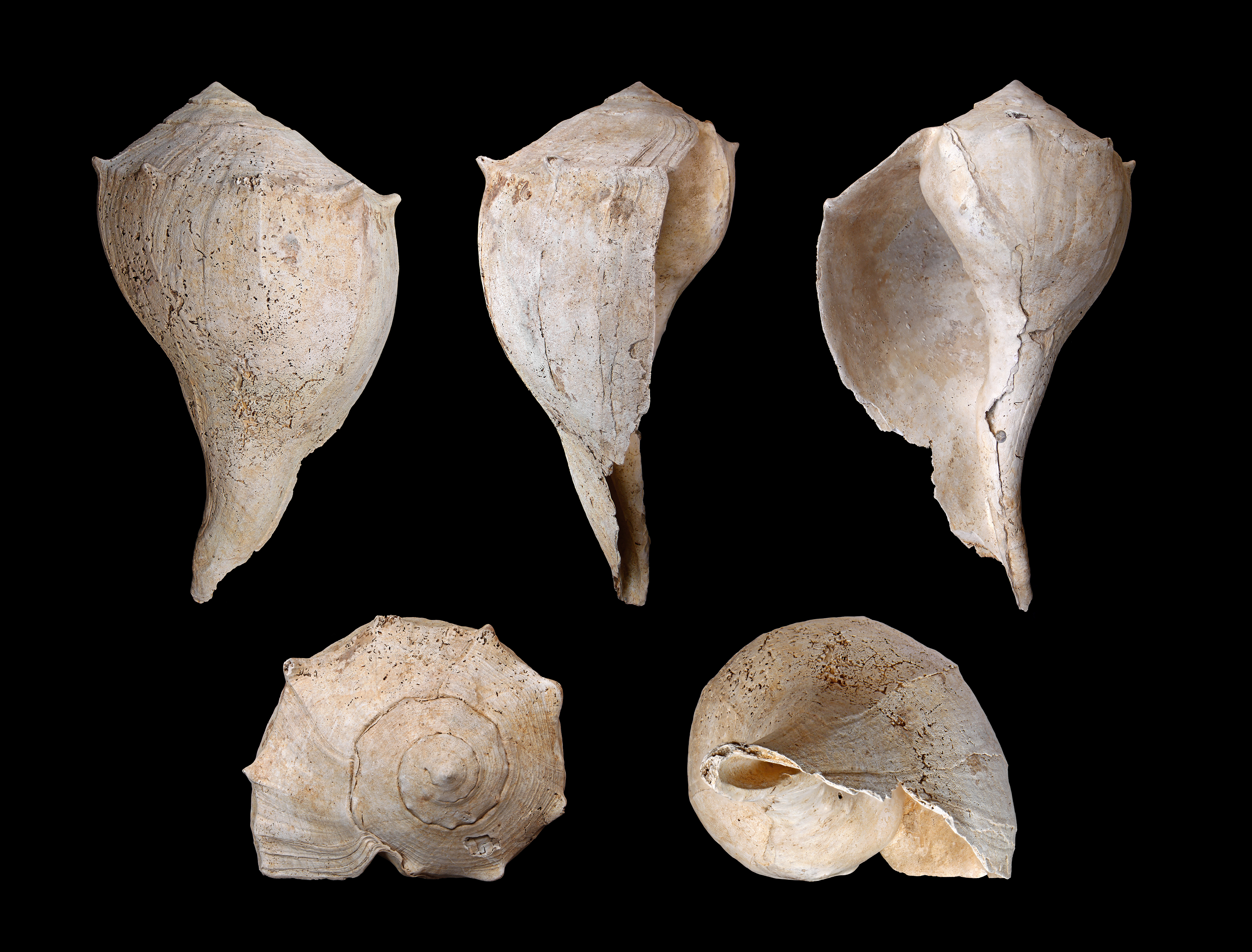
  - Shell in multiple views of a Busycon contrarium whelk
    †Busycon contrarium
  - †Busycon perversum
  - †Busycon spiniger
  - †Busycon willcoxi
  - †Busycon willcoxiana
- Busycotypus
  - †Busycotypus canaliculatus
  - †Busycotypus concinnum
  - †Busycotypus spiratus
- Buteo
  - †Buteo jamaicensis
- Bythocythere
  - †Bythocythere b informal

== C ==
- Cadulus
  - †Cadulus quadridentatus
- Caecum
  - †Caecum beaufortensis
  - †Caecum flemingi
  - †Caecum imbricatum
  - †Caecum pulchellum
  - †Caecum regulare
  - †Caecum stevensoni
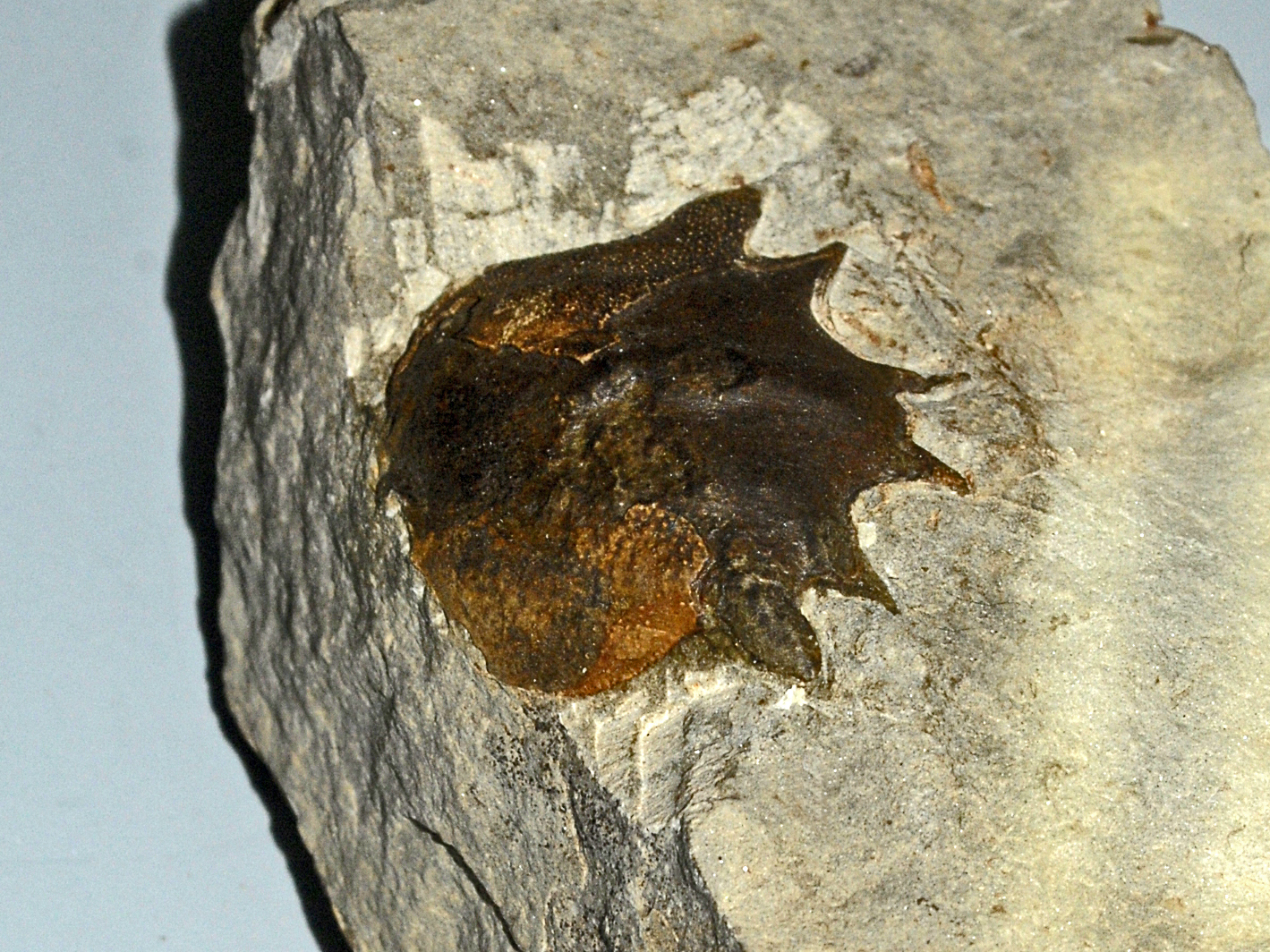
- Fossilized carapace of the Paleocene-Miocene crab Calappilia
  †Calappilia
  - †Calappilia sitzi
- Calidris
  - †Calidris melanotos – or unidentified related form
- Callinectes
  - †Callinectes sapidus
- Calliostoma
  - †Calliostoma bella – or unidentified comparable form
  - †Calliostoma philanthropum
  - †Calliostoma virginicum
  - †Calliostoma willcoxianum
- Callista
  - †Callista neusensis
- Callocardia
  - †Callocardia castoriana
  - †Callocardia chioneformis
- †Callophoca
  - †Callophoca ambigua
  - †Callophoca obscura
- Callucina
  - †Callucina keenae
- Calonectris
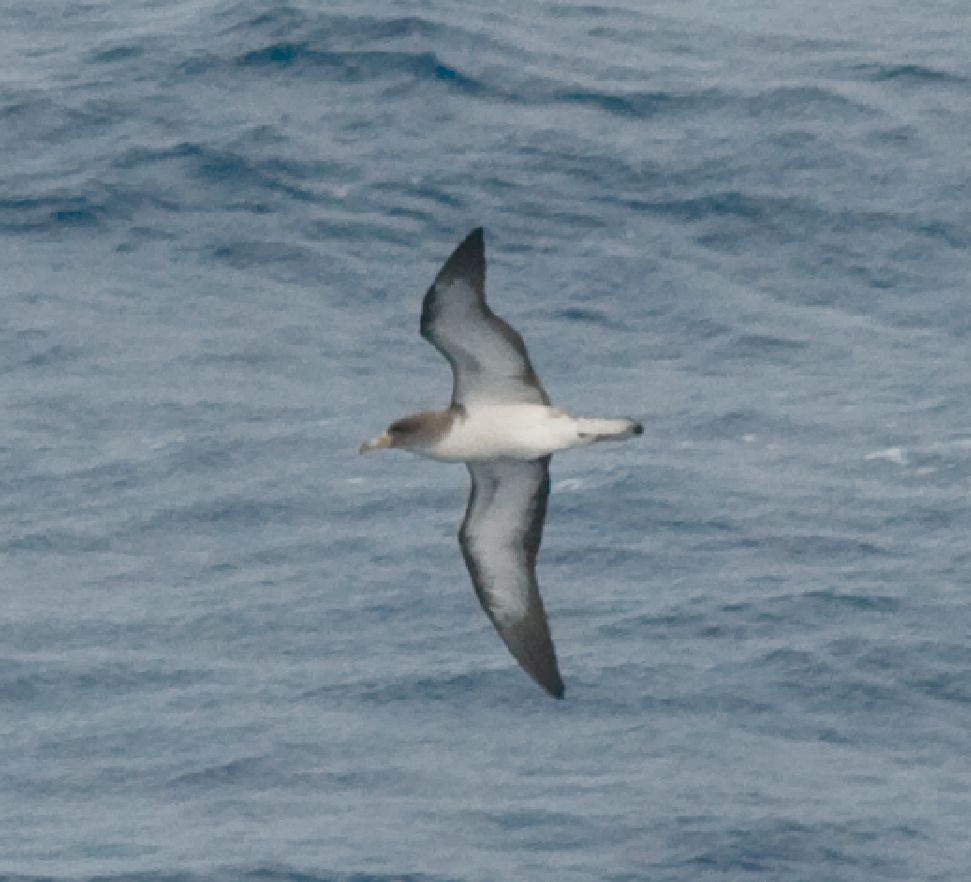
  - A living Calonectris borealis, or Cory's shearwater
    †Calonectris borealis – or unidentified related form
  - †Calonectris diomedea – or unidentified related form
  - †Calonectris krantzi – type locality for species
- Calotrophon
  - †Calotrophon ostrearum
- Calyptraea
  - †Calyptraea centralis
- Campylocythere
  - †Campylocythere laeva
- Cancellaria
  - †Cancellaria rotunda
- †Cannopilus
  - †Cannopilus a informal
  - †Cannopilus b informal
  - †Cannopilus binoculus
  - †Cannopilus haeckelii
  - †Cannopilus hemisphaericus
  - †Cannopilus sphaericus
  - †Cannopilus triommata
- Capella
  - †Capella media – or unidentified related form
- Carcharhinus
  - †Carcharhinus brachyurus
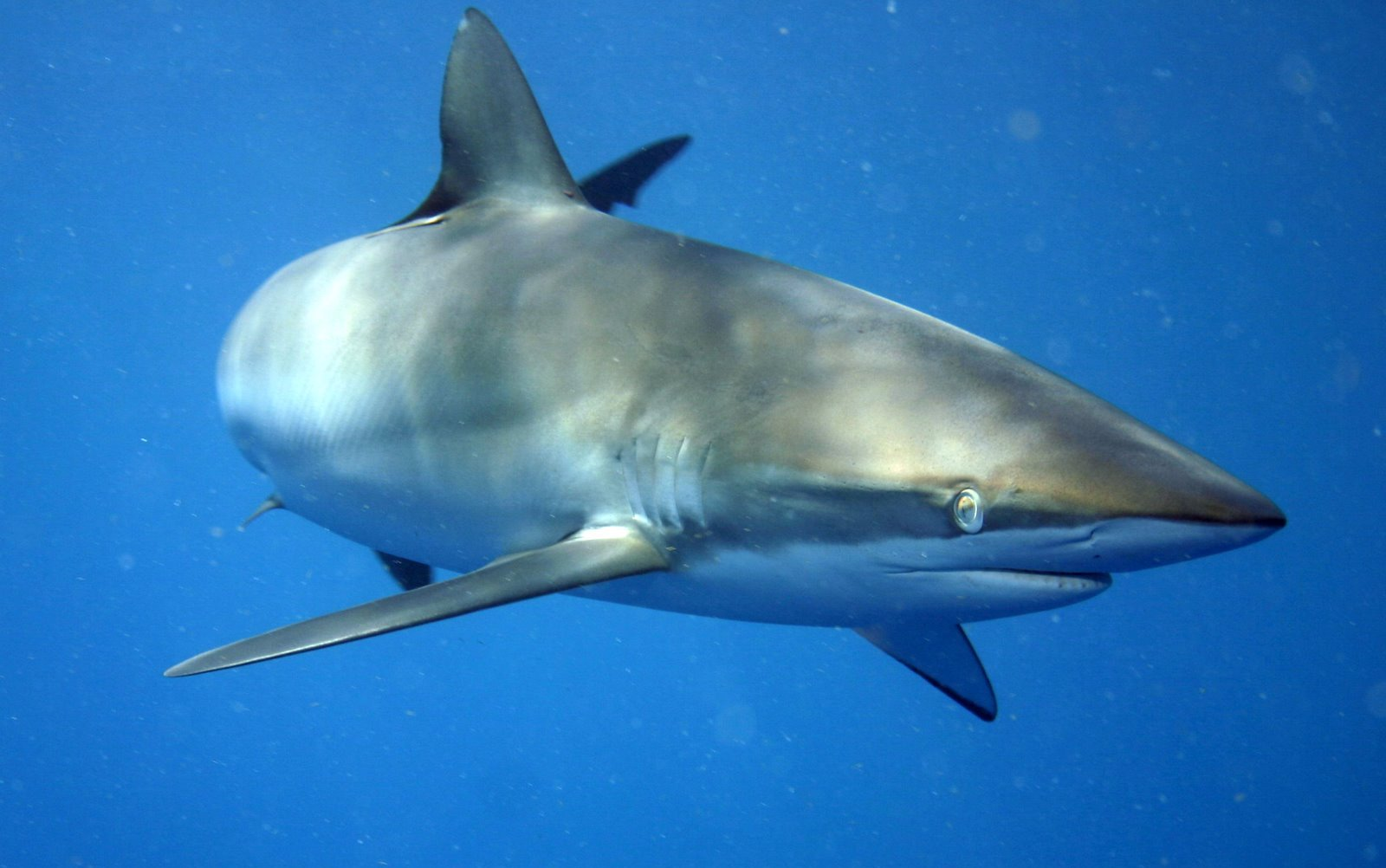
  - A living Carcharhinus falciformis, or silky shark
    †Carcharhinus falciformis
  - †Carcharhinus gibbesi
  - †Carcharhinus leucas
  - †Carcharhinus macloti
  - †Carcharhinus obscurus
  - †Carcharhinus perezi
  - †Carcharhinus plumbeus
  - †Carcharhinus priscus
- Carcharias
  - †Carcharias taurus
- Carcharodon
  - †Carcharodon auriculatus
  - †Carcharodon carcharias
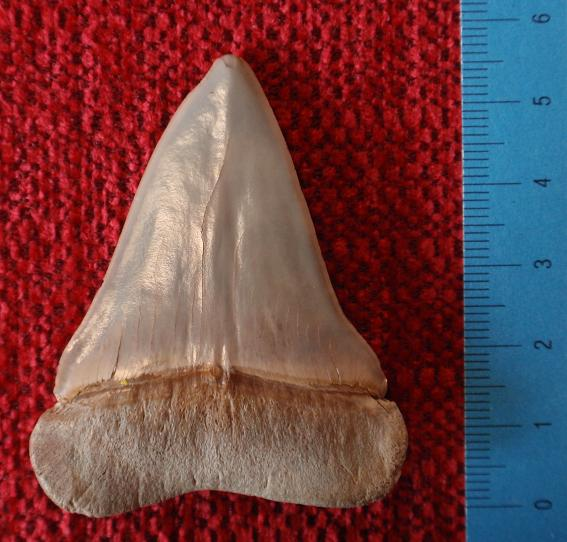
  - Fossilized tooth of the Miocene-Pliocene shark Cosmopolitodus hastalis, or broad-toothed mako
    †Carcharodon hastalis
  - †Carcharodon subauriculatus
- Cardiolucina
  - †Cardiolucina postalveata
- Carditamera
  - †Carditamera arata
  - †Carditamera columbiana
  - †Carditamera floridana
- Cardium
  - †Cardium belgradensis
- Caretta
  - †Caretta patriciae
- †Caricella
- †Carolinapecten
  - †Carolinapecten eboreus
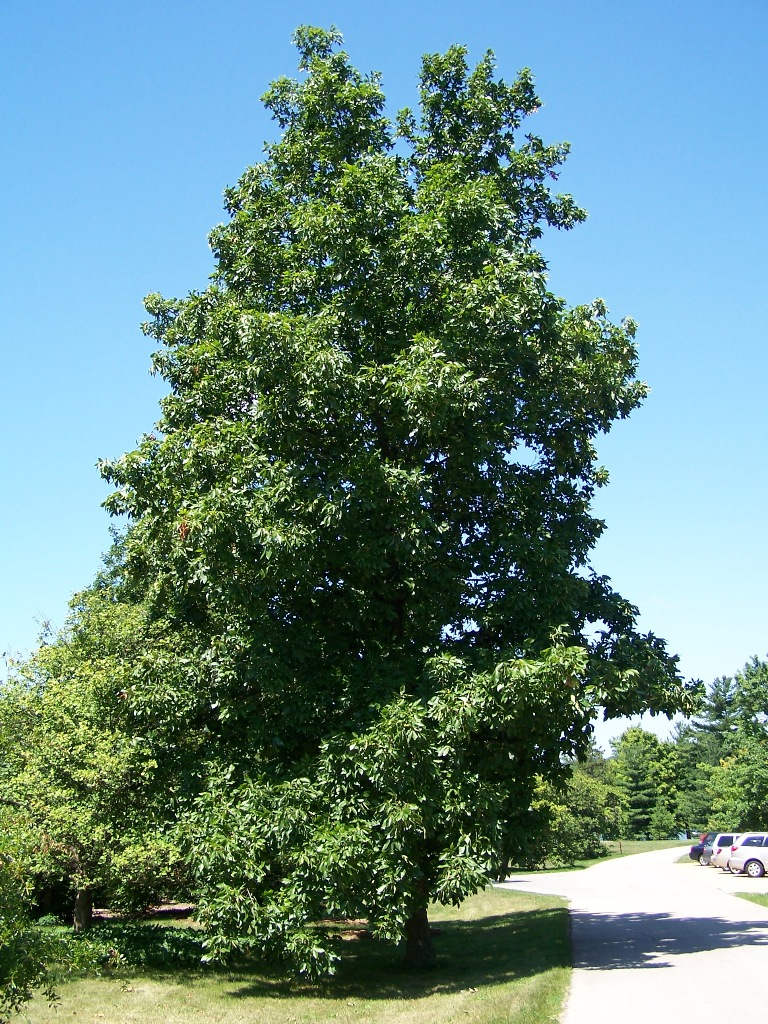
- A living Carya, or hickory tree
  Carya
- Caryocorbula
  - †Caryocorbula auroraensis
  - †Caryocorbula caribaea
  - †Caryocorbula conradi
  - †Caryocorbula contracta
- Cassidulina
  - †Cassidulina laevigata
- †Cassigerinella
  - †Cassigerinella chipolensis
- Cassis
- Castanea
- Catharacta
- Caudites
  - †Caudites paraasymmetricus
- †Caulolatilus
  - †Caulolatilus cyanops – or unidentified comparable form
- Cavilinga
  - †Cavilinga trisulcata
  - †Cavilinga trisulcatus
- †Cavilucina
- Celleporaria
  - †Celleporaria albirostris – or unidentified comparable form
- Centropristis
  - †Centropristis striata – or unidentified comparable form
- Cerastoderma
  - †Cerastoderma acutilaqueatum
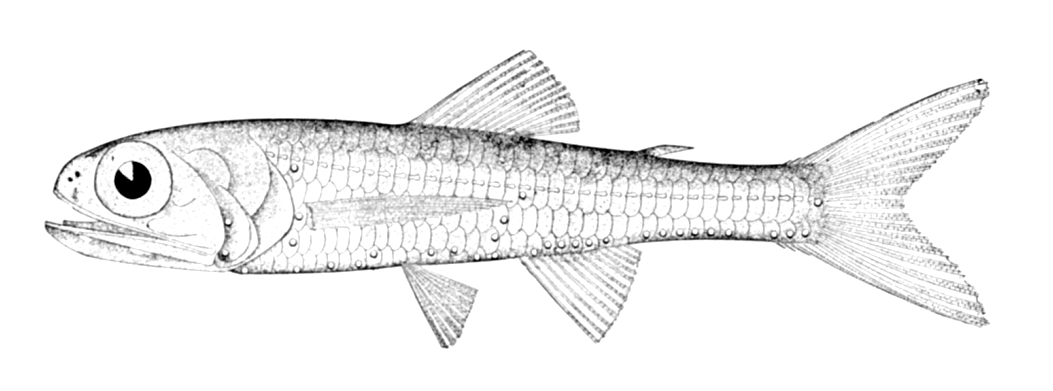
- Illustration of a living Ceratoscopelus lanternfish
  Ceratoscopelus
  - †Ceratoscopelus maderensis
- †Cerberorhaphidites – type locality for genus
  - †Cerberorhaphidites auriformis – type locality for species
- Cerithiopsis
  - †Cerithiopsis vinca
- Cerithium
  - †Cerithium eburneum
- Cerodrillia – report made of unidentified related form or using admittedly obsolete nomenclature
  - †Cerodrillia simpsoni
- †Ceronnectes
  - †Ceronnectes granulosa – type locality for species
- †Cerorhinca
- Cetorhinus
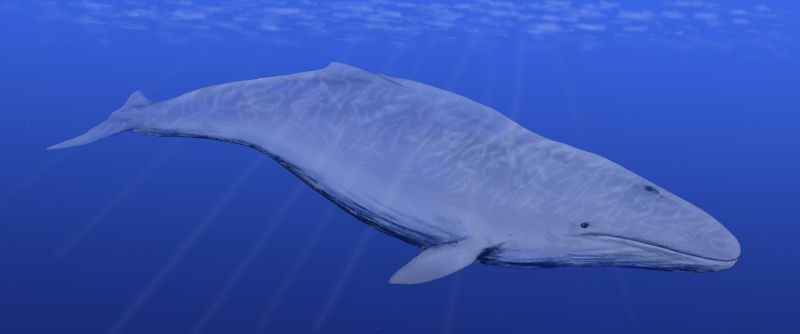
- Life restoration of the Miocene-Pliocene whale Cetotherium
  †Cetotherium
  - †Cetotherium polyporum – type locality for species
- Chaetopleura
- Chama
  - †Chama congregata
  - †Chama gardnerae
  - †Chama macerophylla
  - †Chama richardsi
- Chamelea
  - †Chamelea spada
- Champsodelphis – or unidentified comparable form
- Chelonia – tentative report
- Living Chelonibia acorn barnacles
  Chelonibia
  - †Chelonibia melleni
- Chemnitzia
- †Chesacardium
  - †Chesacardium acutilacqueatum
  - †Chesacardium acutilaqueatum
- †Chesaconcavus
  - †Chesaconcavus proteus
- †Chesapecten
  - †Chesapecten coccymelus
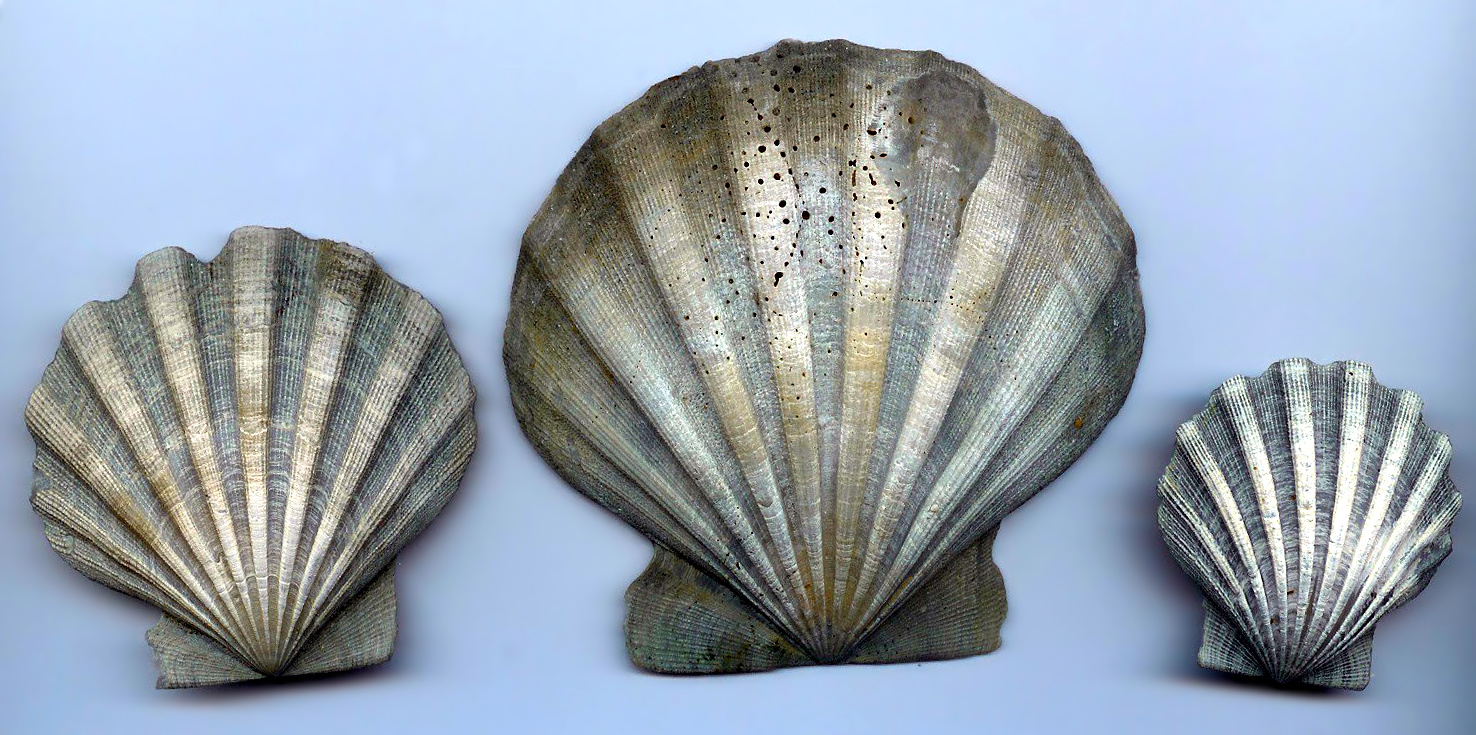
  - Shells of the Pliocene scallop Chesapecten jeffersonius
    †Chesapecten jeffersonius
  - †Chesapecten madisonius
  - †Chesapecten middlesexensis
  - †Chesapecten nefrens – tentative report
- Chilomycterus
  - †Chilomycterus schoepfi
  - †Chilomycterus schoepfii
- Chione
  - †Chione cancellata
  - †Chione cortinaria
  - †Chione cribraria
  - †Chione imitabilis
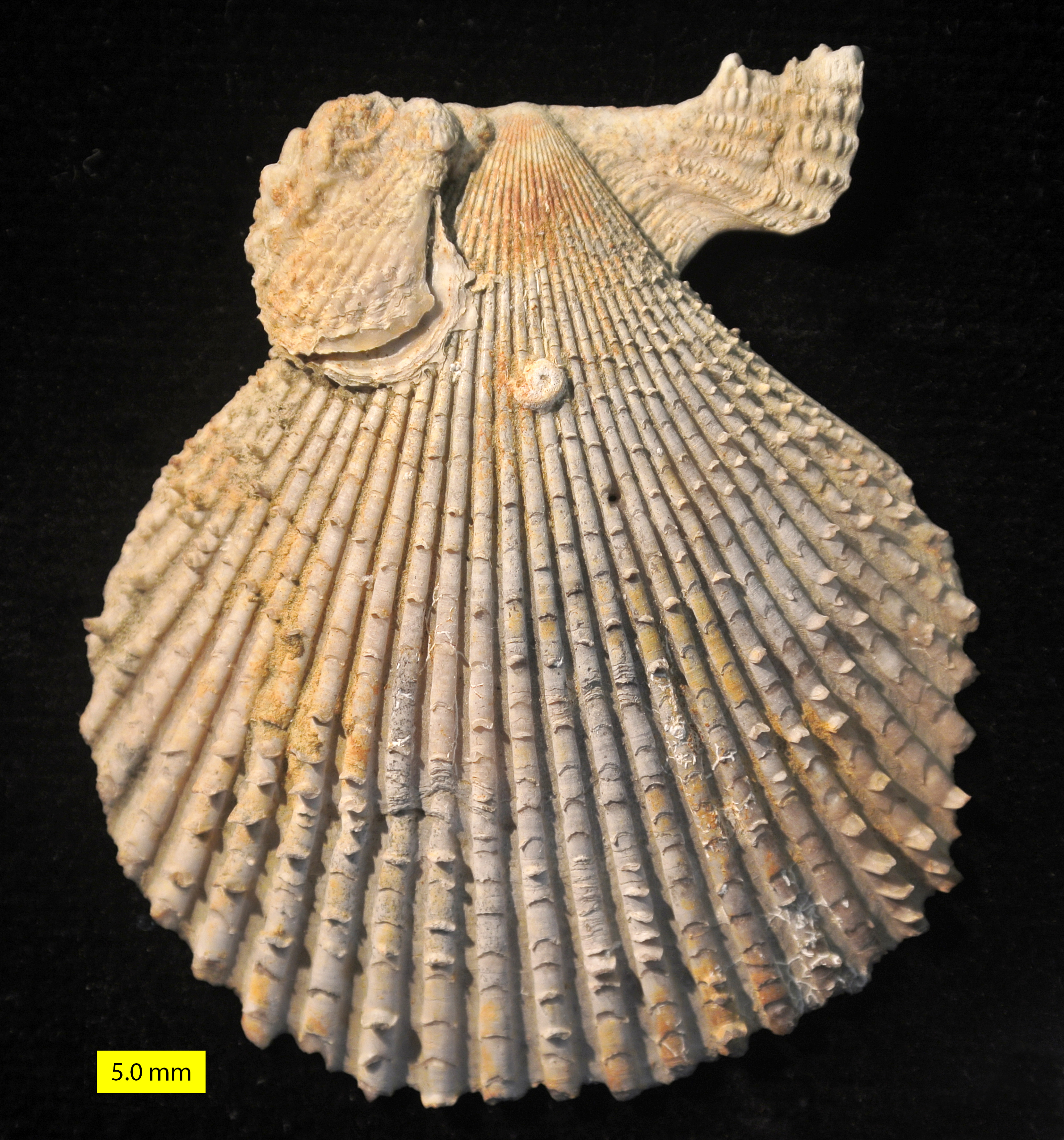
- Fossillized shell of a Chlamys bivalve
  Chlamys
  - †Chlamys biddleana – type locality for species
  - †Chlamys cawcawensis
  - †Chlamys cookei – type locality for species
  - †Chlamys cushmani – type locality for species
  - †Chlamys decemnaria
  - †Chlamys deshayesii
  - †Chlamys membranosa
  - †Chlamys membranosus
- Chrysemys
- Cibicides
  - †Cibicides croatanensis
  - †Cibicides lobatulus
- Cibicidina
  - †Cibicidina blanpiedi
- Cibicidoides
  - †Cibicidoides lawi
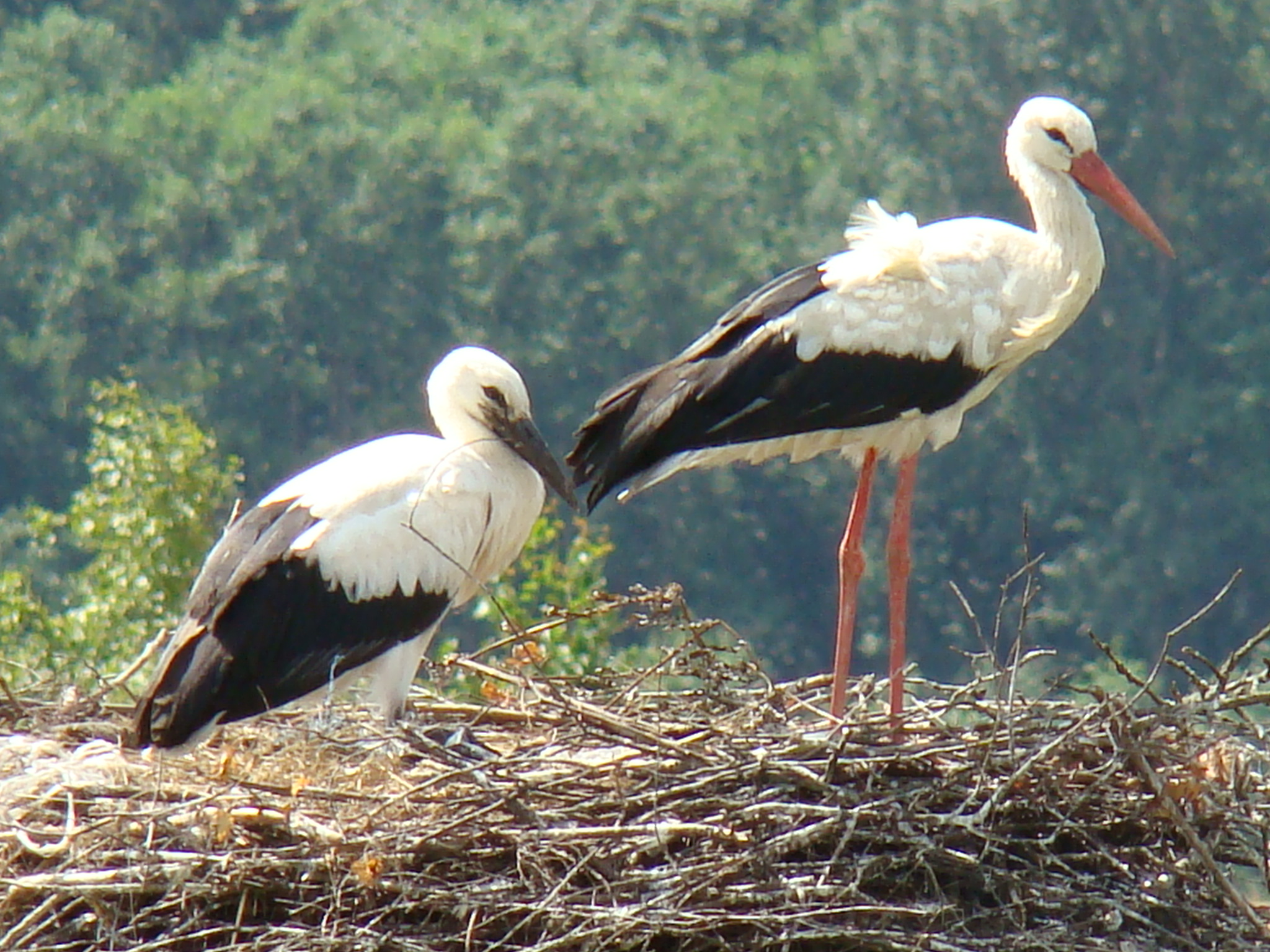
- Living Ciconia storks
  Ciconia
  - †Ciconia speciesone informal
  - †Ciconia speciestwo informal
- Cidaris
  - †Cidaris pratti
- Circulus – report made of unidentified related form or using admittedly obsolete nomenclature
  - †Circulus orbignyi
- Citharichthys
- Cladocora
- †Cladogramma
  - †Cladogramma dubium
- Clathrodrillia – report made of unidentified related form or using admittedly obsolete nomenclature
  - †Clathrodrillia emmonsi
- Clathrus
  - †Clathrus antillarum
- Clavatula
  - †Clavatula cornelliana
- †Clavicula
  - †Clavicula polymorpha
- †Clavidrupa
  - †Clavidrupa anita
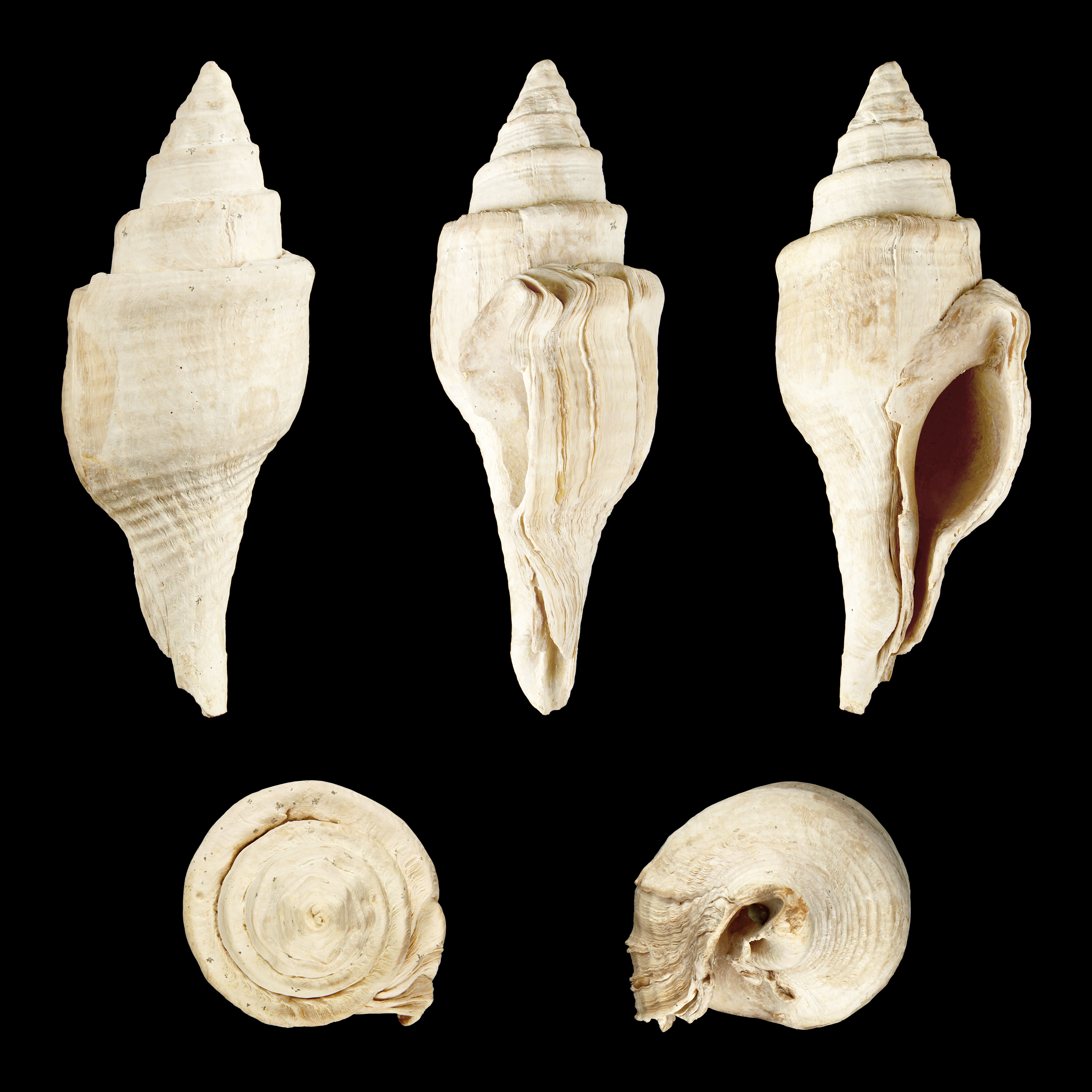
- Multiple views of a fossilized shell of the Paleocene-Pliocene spindle sea snail Clavilithes
  Clavilithes – or unidentified comparable form
  - †Clavilithes abruptus
- Clavus – report made of unidentified related form or using admittedly obsolete nomenclature
  - †Clavus drewi
  - †Clavus polygonalis
- †Claytonia – type locality for genus
  - †Claytonia rayi – type locality for species
- Clidiophora
  - †Clidiophora crassidens
  - †Clidiophora tuomeyi
  - †Clidiophora tuorneyi
- Cliona – tentative report
- Clithrocytheridea
  - †Clithrocytheridea garretti
- Closia
  - †Closia antiqua
- †Cnestocythere – tentative report
- †Cocaia
  - †Cocaia grigsbyi
- Cochliolepis
  - †Cochliolepis holmesi
- Cochlodesma
  - †Cochlodesma emmonsii
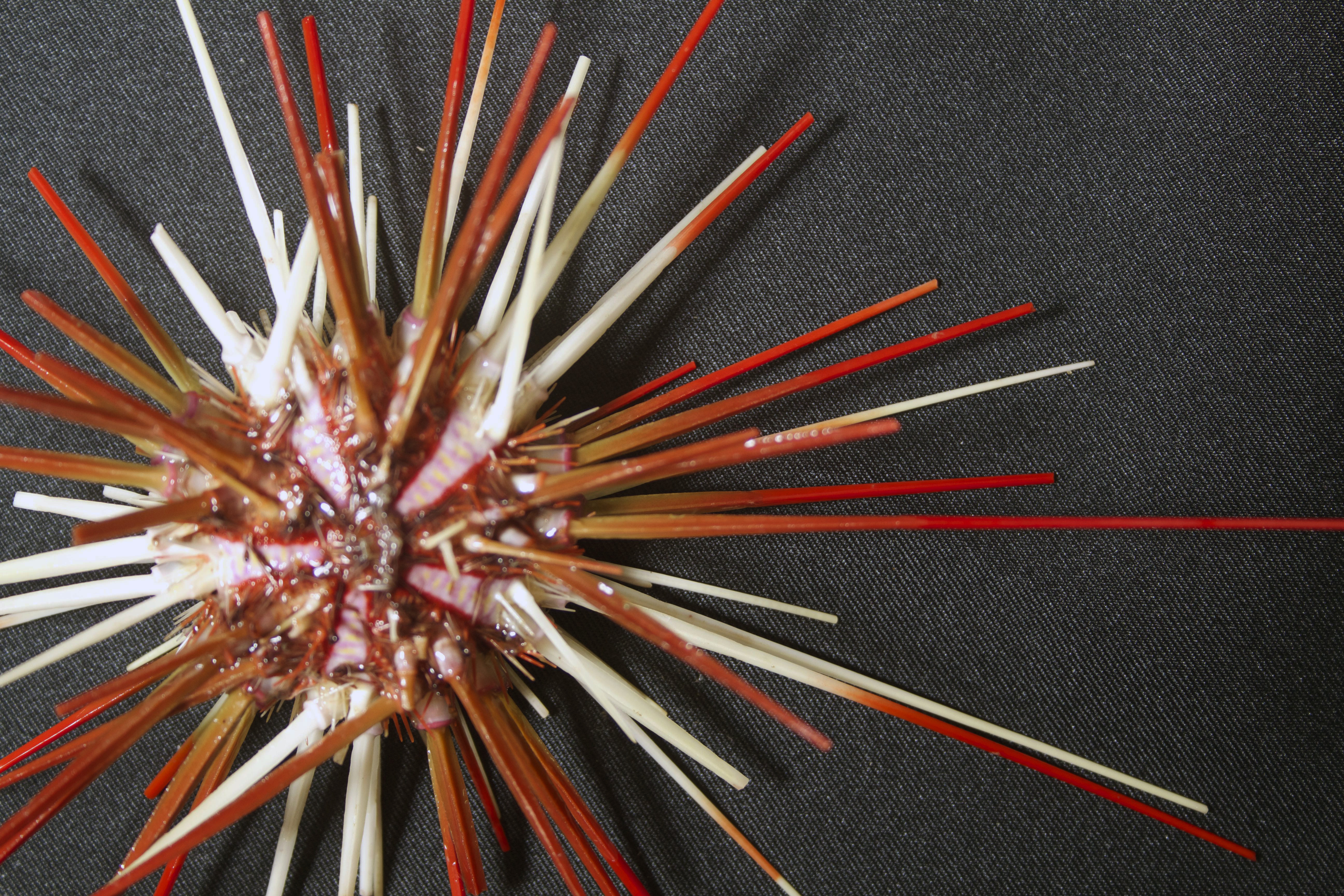
- A Coelopleurus sea urchin
  Coelopleurus
  - †Coelopleurus carolinensis
  - †Coelopleurus infulatus
- Colubraria
  - †Colubraria aclinica
- †Colymboides – tentative report
- Compsodrillia
  - †Compsodrillia chowanensis
- Concavus
  - †Concavus crassostricola
- Conger
  - †Conger oceanicus – or unidentified comparable form
- Congeria
  - †Congeria leucopheatus
- †Conradostrea
  - †Conradostrea lawrencei
  - †Conradostrea sculpturata
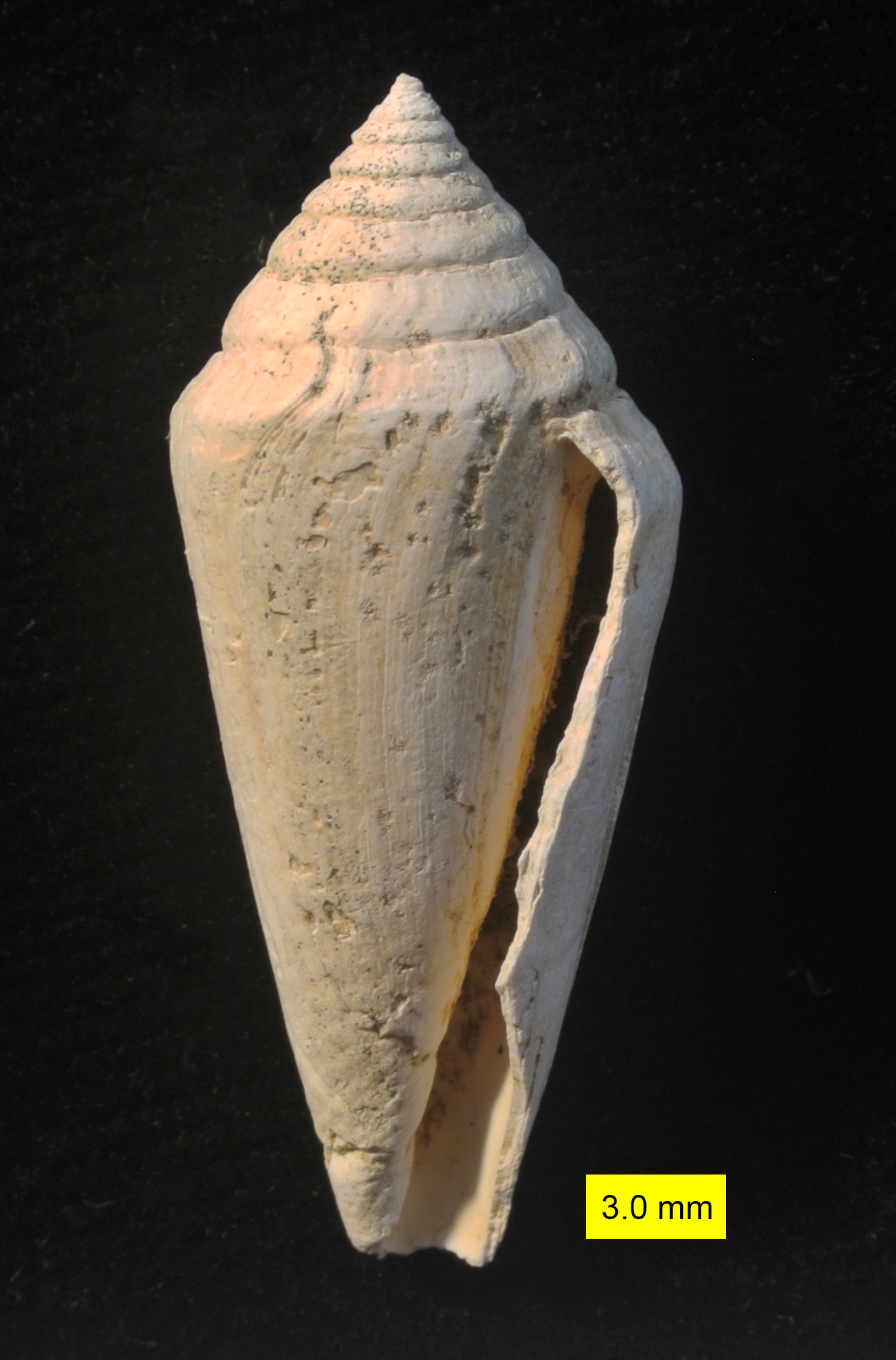
- Fossilized shell of a Conus cone snail
  Conus
  - †Conus mutilatus – tentative report
  - †Conus postalveatus – type locality for species
  - †Conus sauridens
- Cooperella
  - †Cooperella carpenteri
- Corbicula
  - †Corbicula densata
- †Corbisema
  - †Corbisema tracantha
- Corbula
  - †Corbula inaequalis
- Corvus
  - †Corvus ossifragus – or unidentified related form
- †Corylus
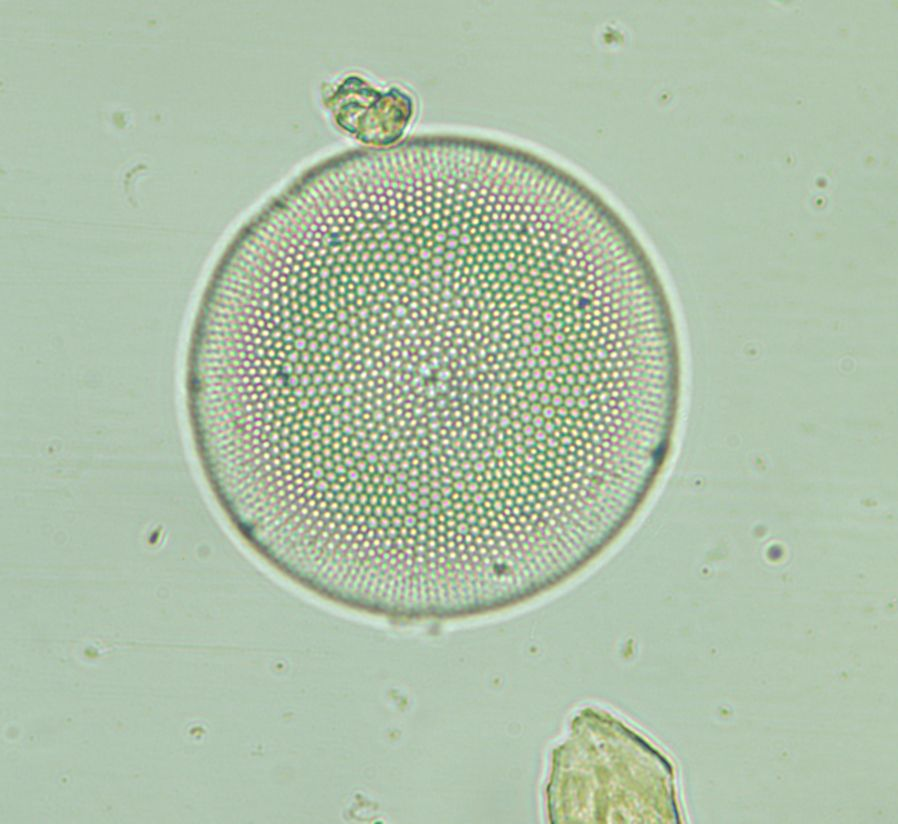
- A living Coscinodiscus diatom
  †Coscinodiscus
  - †Coscinodiscus apiculatus
  - †Coscinodiscus asteromphalus
  - †Coscinodiscus curvatulus
  - †Coscinodiscus gigas
  - †Coscinodiscus lewisianus
  - †Coscinodiscus marginatus
  - †Coscinodiscus monicae
  - †Coscinodiscus nitidus
  - †Coscinodiscus nodulifer
  - †Coscinodiscus oculus
  - †Coscinodiscus perforatus
  - †Coscinodiscus plicatus
  - †Coscinodiscus praeyabei
  - †Coscinodiscus rothii
  - †Coscinodiscus stellaris
  - †Coscinodiscus vetustissimus
- †Cosmodiscus
  - †Cosmodiscus elegans
- Cosmotriphora
  - †Cosmotriphora dupliniana
- Costacallista
  - †Costacallista emmonsi
- †Costaglycymeris
  - †Costaglycymeris subovata
- Cotonopsis
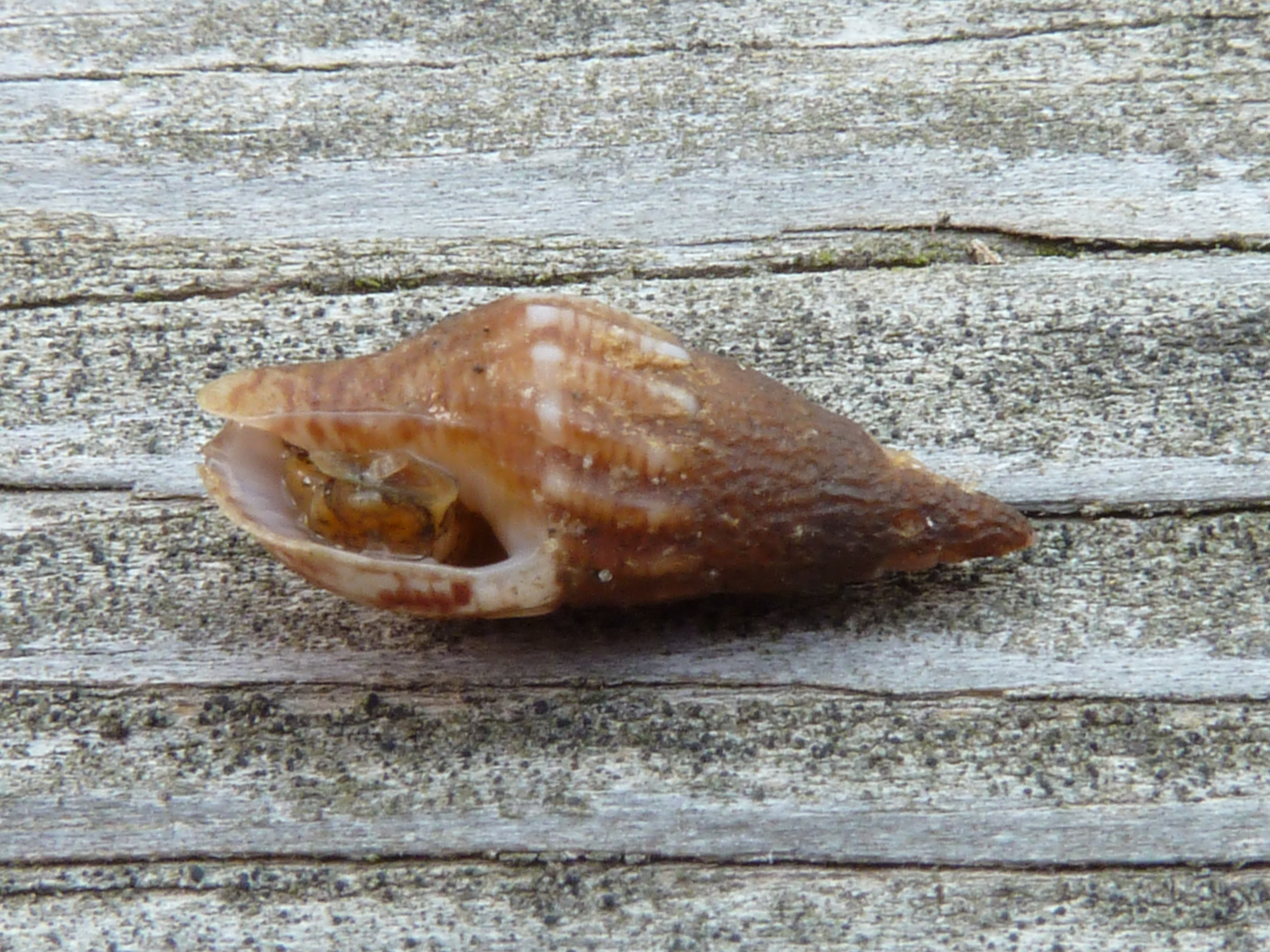
  - Shell of a Cotonopsis lafresnayi, or well-ribbed dove sea snail
    †Cotonopsis lafresnayi
- Crania
- †Craspedodiscus
  - †Craspedodiscus coscinodiscus
- Crassatella
  - †Crassatella alta
  - †Crassatella mississippiensis
  - †Crassatella texalta
  - †Crassatella wilcoxi
- Crassinella
  - †Crassinella dupliniana
  - †Crassinella johnsoni
  - †Crassinella lunulata
  - †Crassinella neuseana
- Crassispira
  - †Crassispira perrugata
- Crassostrea
  - †Crassostrea virginica
- †Crenatocetus – type locality for genus
  - †Crenatocetus rayi – type locality for species
- †Crenatosiren – or unidentified comparable form
  - †Crenatosiren olseni
- Crenella
  - †Crenella decussata
- Crepidula
  - †Crepidula convexa
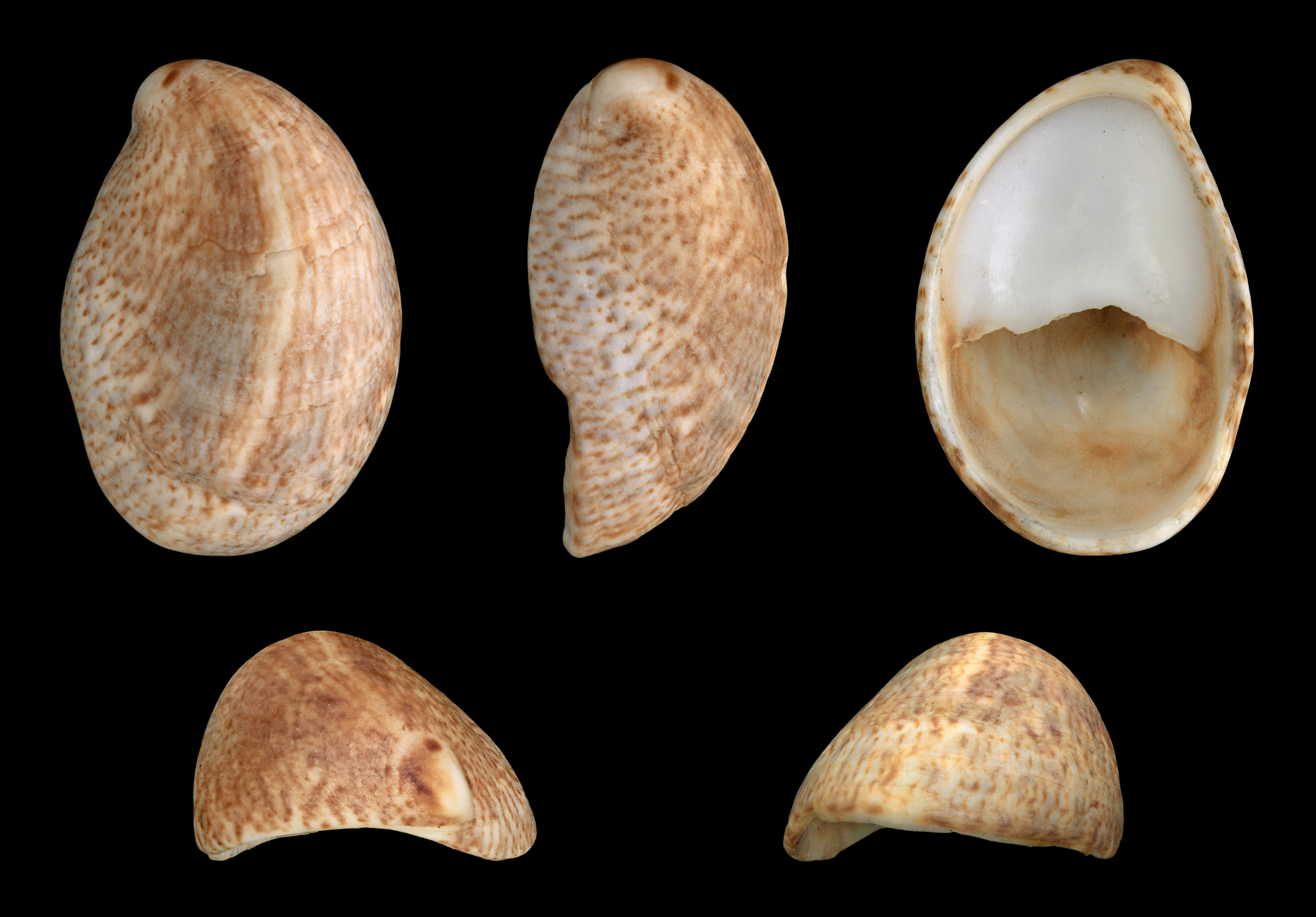
  - Shell in multiple views of a Crepidula fornicata, or common slipper shell sea snail
    †Crepidula fornicata
  - †Crepidula lawrencei
  - †Crepidula plana
  - †Crepidula spinulosa
- Cribrilina
  - †Cribrilina punctata
- †Cribrononion
  - †Cribrononion preadvena
  - †Cribrononion preadvenum – or unidentified comparable form
- Crucibulum
  - †Crucibulum constrictum
  - †Crucibulum lawrencei
  - †Crucibulum multilineatum
- Ctena
  - †Ctena magnoliana
  - †Ctena microimbricata
  - †Ctena speciosa
- †Cubitostrea
  - †Cubitostrea sellaeformis
- Cumingia
  - †Cumingia tellinoides
  - †Cumingia tellionoides
- †Cushamidea – report made of unidentified related form or using admittedly obsolete nomenclature
- Cushmanidea
  - †Cushmanidea seminuda
- †Cussia
  - †Cussia paleacea
  - †Cussia praepaleacea
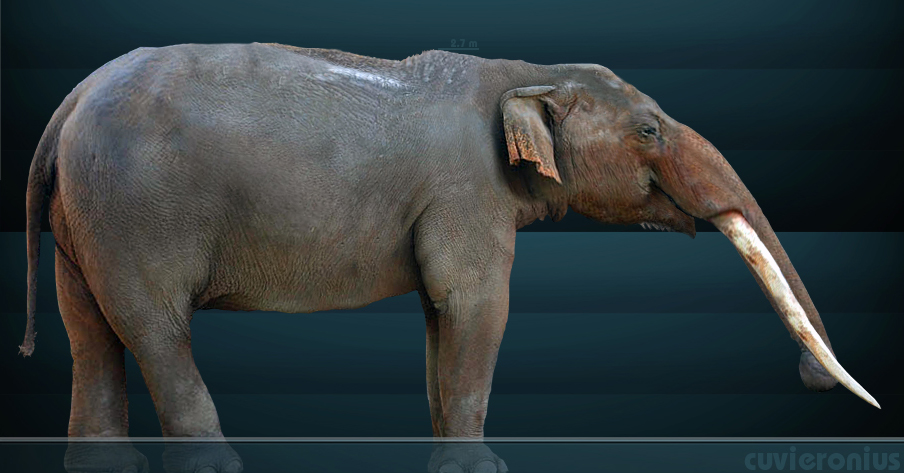
- Life restoration of the Pliocene-Holocene elephant relative Cuvieronius
  †Cuvieronius
- Cyclocardia
  - †Cyclocardia granulata
  - †Cyclocardia trentensis
- †Cyclocolposa
  - †Cyclocolposa perforata
- Cyclostremiscus
  - †Cyclostremiscus obliquestriatus
- †Cyclotella
  - †Cyclotella kelloggi
- Cygnus
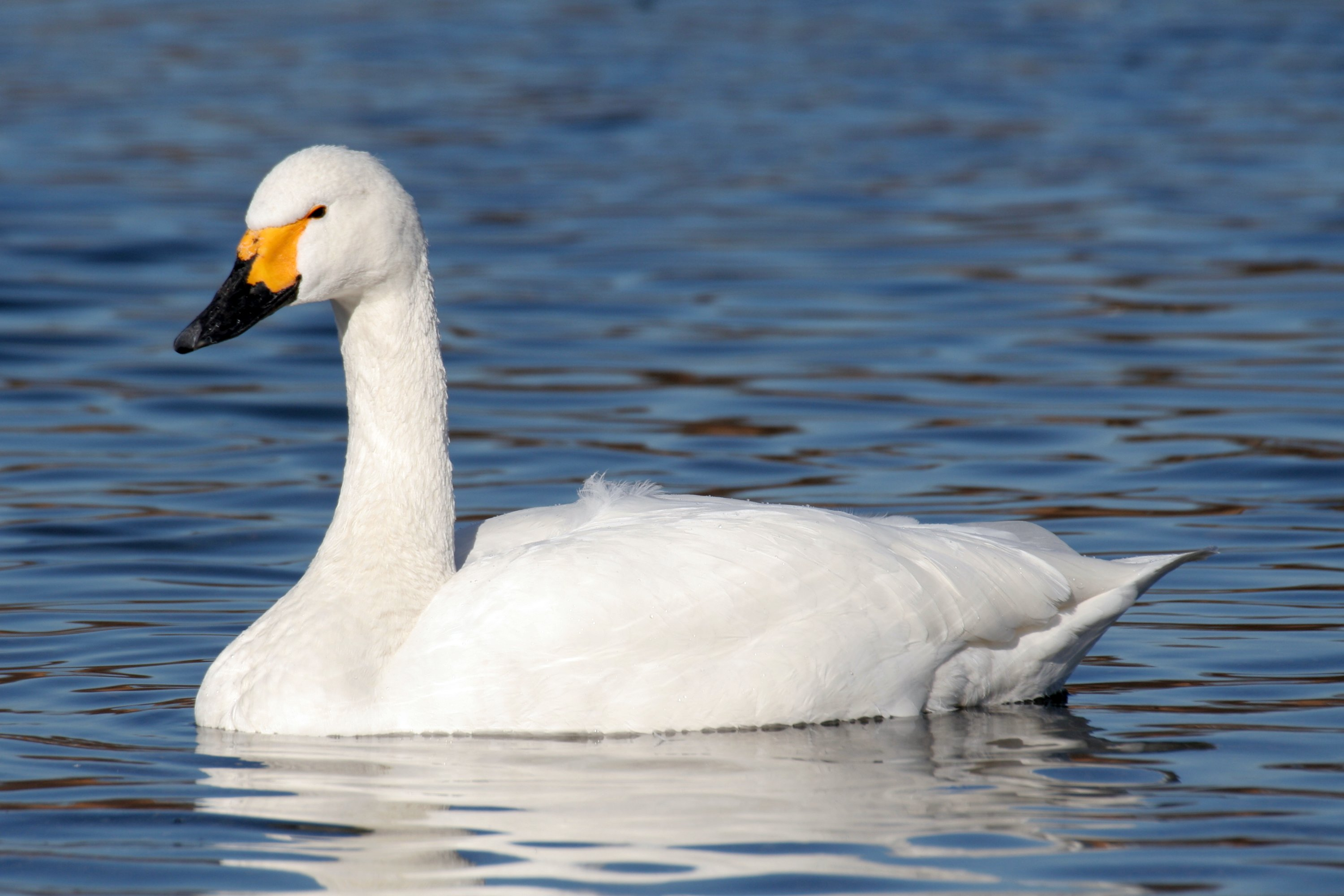
  - A living Cygnus columbianus, or tundra swan
    †Cygnus columbianus – or unidentified related form
- Cylichna
  - †Cylichna duplinensis
- †Cylindracanthus
  - †Cylindracanthus rectus
- Cymatium
  - †Cymatium planinodum – type locality for species
- †Cymatogonia
  - †Cymatogonia amblyoceros
- †Cymatosira
  - †Cymatosira a informal
  - †Cymatosira andersoni
  - †Cymatosira immunis
- Cymatosyrinx
  - †Cymatosyrinx limatula – or unidentified comparable form
  - †Cymatosyrinx lunata
  - †Cymatosyrinx tiara
  - †Cymatosyrinx ziczac
- Cynoscion
  - †Cynoscion nebulosus – or unidentified comparable form
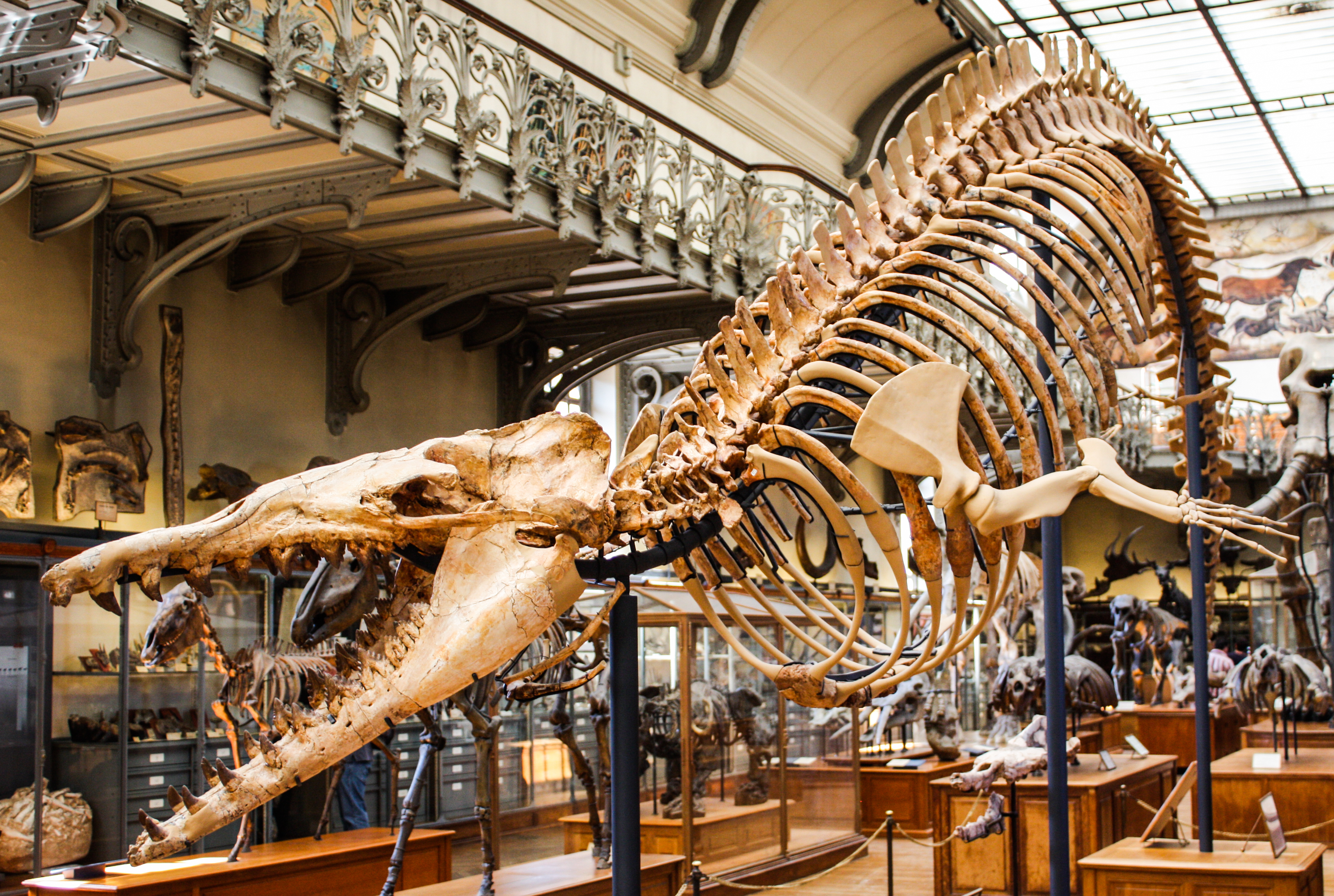
- Mounted fossilized skeleton of the Eocene whale Cynthiacetus
  †Cynthiacetus
  - †Cynthiacetus maxwelli
- Cypraea
- Cyprideis
  - †Cyprideis b informal
- Cyrtopleura
- †Cyrtorhina
  - †Cyrtorhina fusseli
- Cytherella
  - †Cytherella a informal
  - †Cytherella b informal
- Cytherelloidea
  - †Cytherelloidea a informal
  - †Cytherelloidea colata – or unidentified comparable form
- Cytheretta
  - †Cytheretta alexanderi
- Cytheridea
  - †Cytheridea campwallacensis
  - †Cytheridea carolinensis
  - †Cytheridea virginiensis
- Cytheromorpha
  - †Cytheromorpha curta
  - †Cytheromorpha i informal
  - †Cytheromorpha incisa
  - †Cytheromorpha macroincisa
  - †Cytheromorpha suffolkensis
  - †Cytheromorpha warneri
- Cytheropteron
  - †Cytheropteron talquinensis
  - †Cytheropteron yorktownensis
- Cytherura
  - †Cytherura aa informal
  - †Cytherura bb informal
  - †Cytherura d informal
  - †Cytherura elongata
  - †Cytherura forulata
  - †Cytherura howei
  - †Cytherura l informal
  - †Cytherura m informal
  - †Cytherura n informal
  - †Cytherura reticulata
  - †Cytherura u informal
  - †Cytherura w informal
  - †Cytherura wardensis

== D ==
- †Dallarca
  - †Dallarca elevata – or unidentified related form
  - †Dallarca subrostrata
- Dasyatis
  - †Dasyatis americana – or unidentified comparable form
  - †Dasyatis cavernosa
  - †Dasyatis centroura
  - †Dasyatis say
- †Deinosuchus
  - †Deinosuchus rugosus
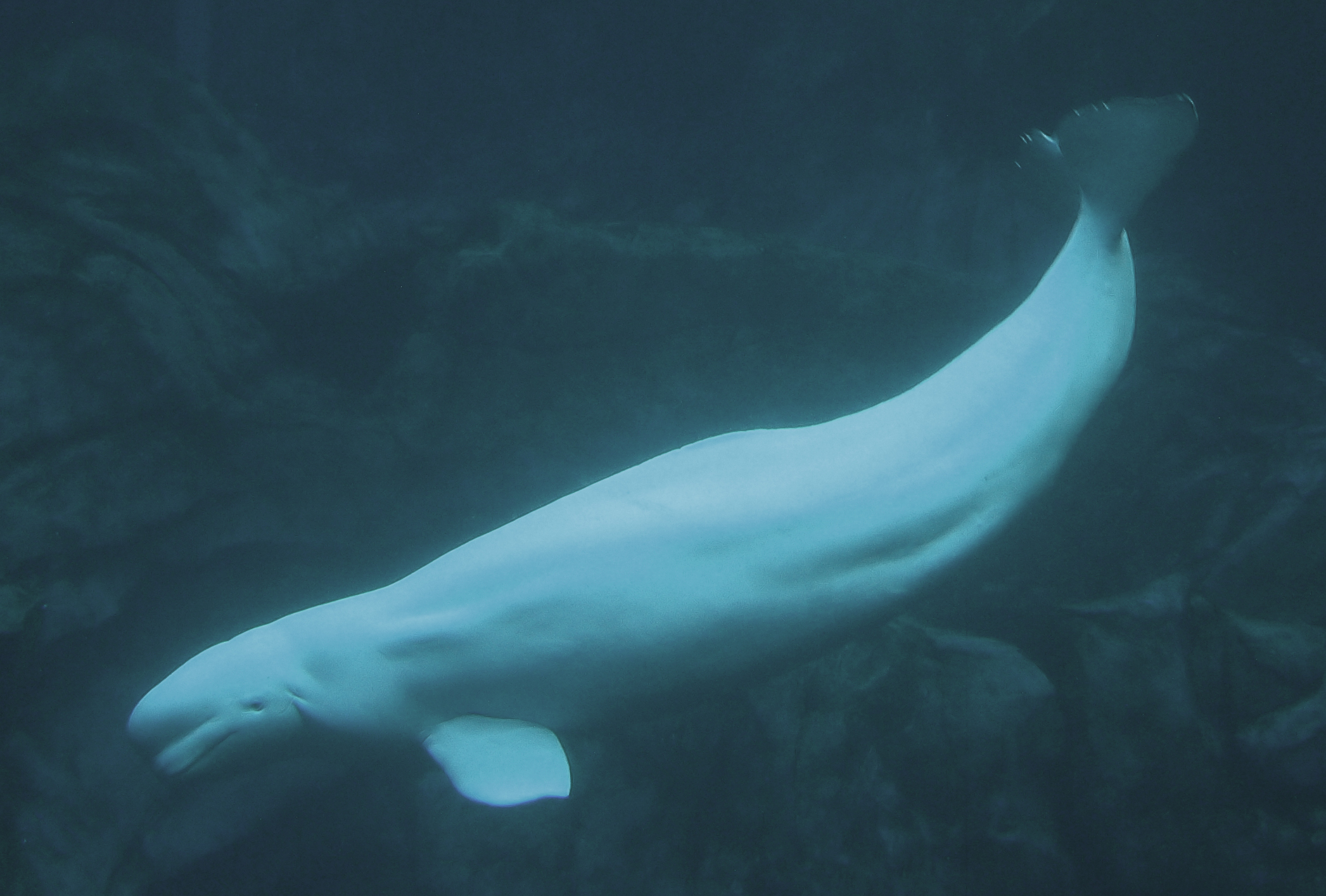
- A living Delphinapterus leucas, or beluga whale
  Delphinapterus
  - †Delphinapterus orcinus – type locality for species
- †Delphineis
  - †Delphineis angustata
  - †Delphineis lineata
  - †Delphineis novaecaesaraea
  - †Delphineis ovata
  - †Delphineis penelliptica
- †Delphinodon
  - †Delphinodon dividum
  - †Delphinodon mento – or unidentified comparable form
- Delphinus
- Democrinus
- Dentalium
  - †Dentalium attenuatum
  - †Dentalium opaculum – tentative report
- †Denticula
  - †Denticula hustedtii
  - †Denticula lauta
  - †Denticula nicobarica
  - †Denticula norwegica
  - †Denticula punctata
- Dentimargo
  - †Dentimargo polyspira – tentative report
  - †Dentimargo polyspria – tentative report
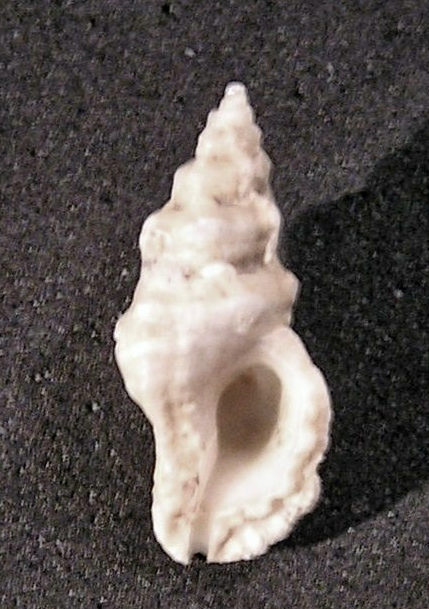
- Shell of a Dermomurex murex sea snail
  Dermomurex
  - †Dermomurex sexangulus
- †Dicladia
  - †Dicladia pylea
- †Dictyocha
  - †Dictyocha a informal
  - †Dictyocha b informal
  - †Dictyocha fibua
  - †Dictyocha rhombica
- †Didianema
  - †Didianema carolinae
- †Dimarzipecten
  - †Dimarzipecten crocus
- Dinocardium
  - †Dinocardium robustum
  - †Dinocardium taphrium
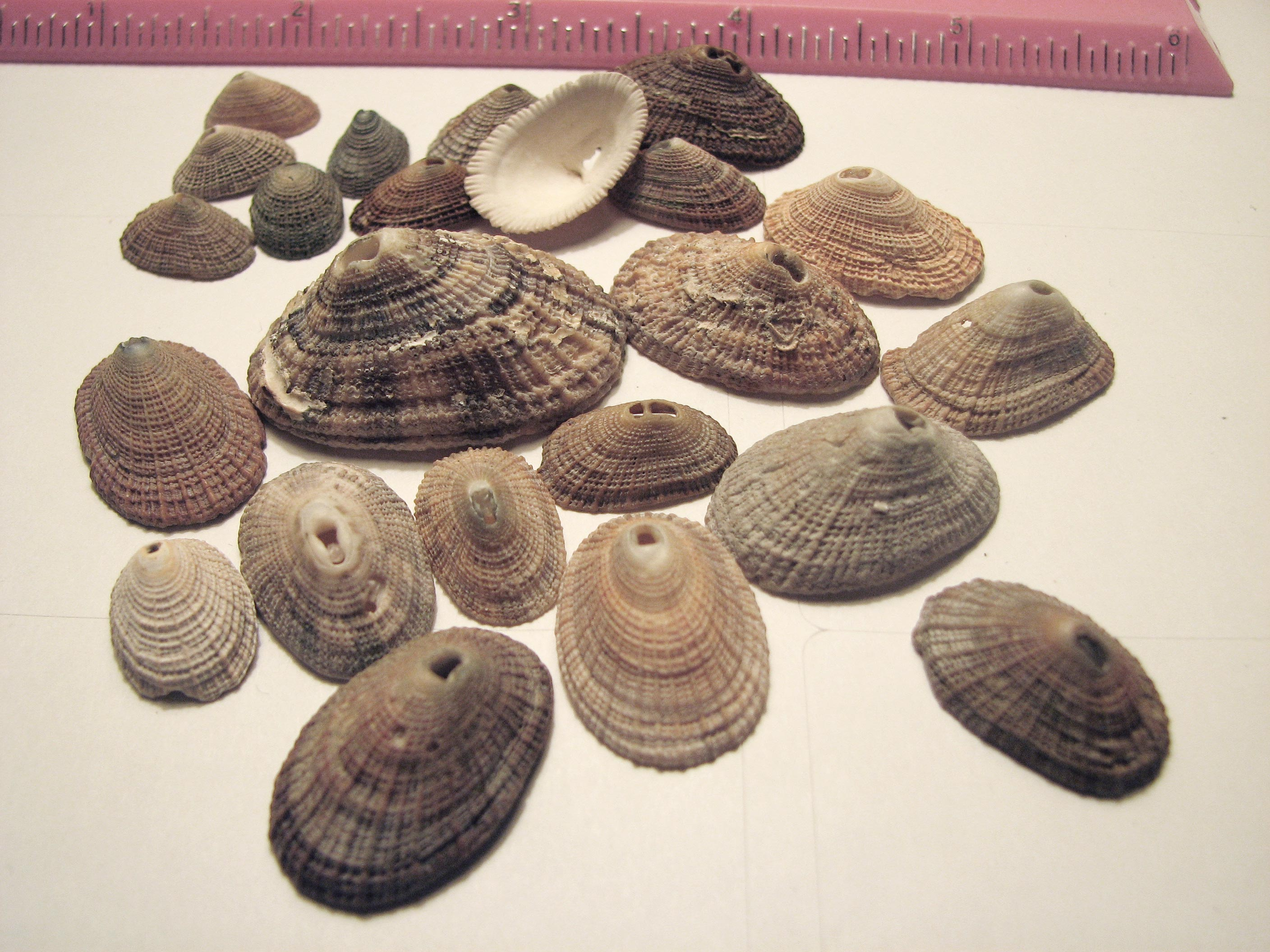
- Shells of Diodora keyhole limpets
  Diodora
  - †Diodora californis
  - †Diodora carolinensis
  - †Diodora catillifonnis – or unidentified comparable form
  - †Diodora marylandica – or unidentified comparable form
  - †Diodora mississippiensis
  - †Diodora nucula
  - †Diodora penderensis – type locality for species
  - †Diodora redimicula
- Diplectrum
  - †Diplectrum formosum – or unidentified comparable form
- Diplodonta
  - †Diplodonta acclinis
  - †Diplodonta berryi
  - †Diplodonta caloosaensis
  - †Diplodonta felcinella
  - †Diplodonta heroni
  - †Diplodonta leana
  - †Diplodonta punctata
  - †Diplodonta soror
  - †Diplodonta subvexa
- †Diploneis
  - †Diploneis crabro
- †Distephanus
  - †Distephanus crux
  - †Distephanus speculum
  - †Distephanus stauracanthus
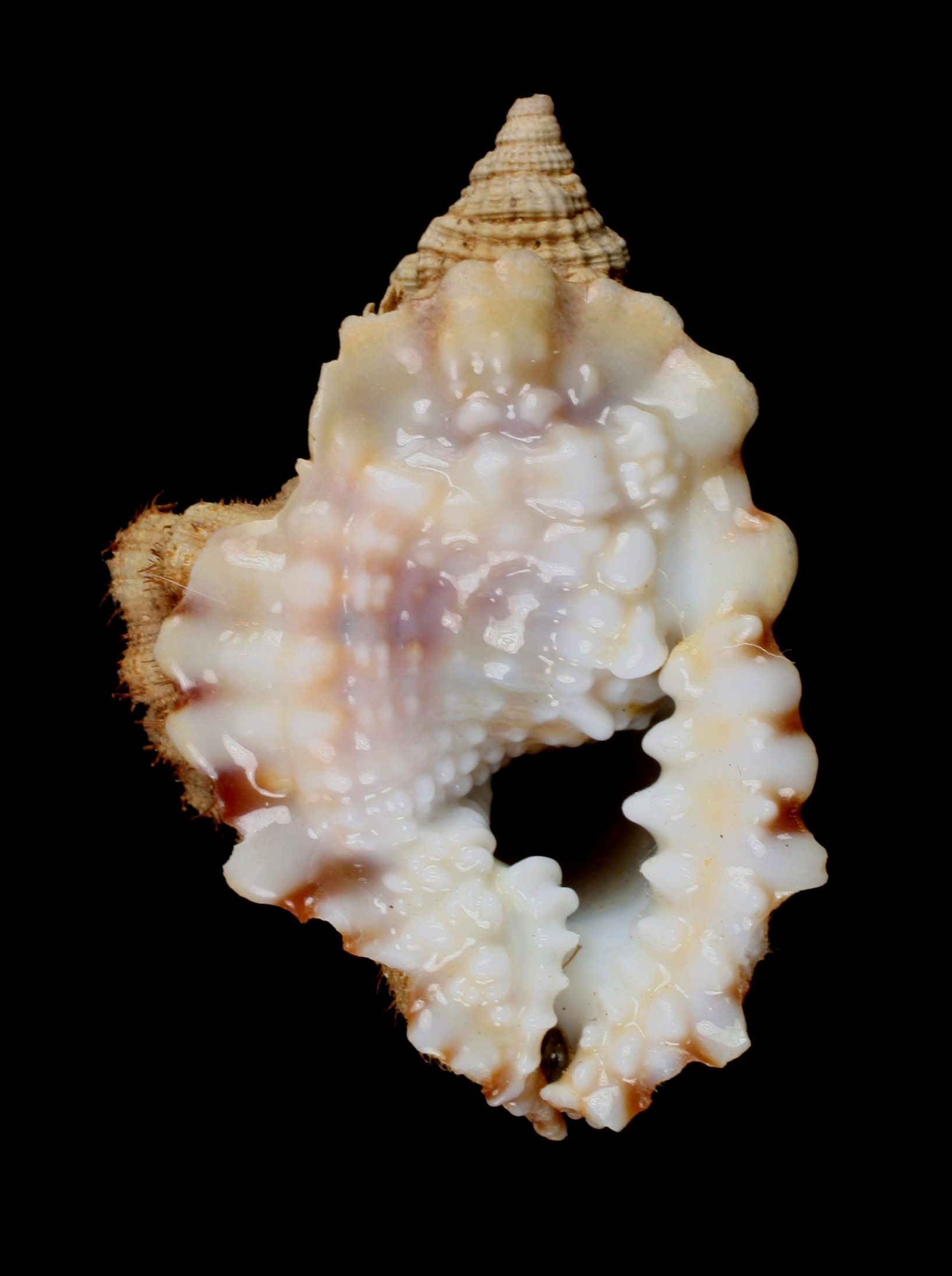
- Shell of a Distorsio sea snail
  Distorsio
  - †Distorsio crassidens
- Divalinga
  - †Divalinga quadrisulcata
  - †Divalinga quadrisulcatus
- †Dixieus
  - †Dixieus dixie – or unidentified comparable form
- Donax
  - †Donax aequilibrata
  - †Donax emmonsi
  - †Donax fossor
  - †Donax idoneus
  - †Donax variabilis
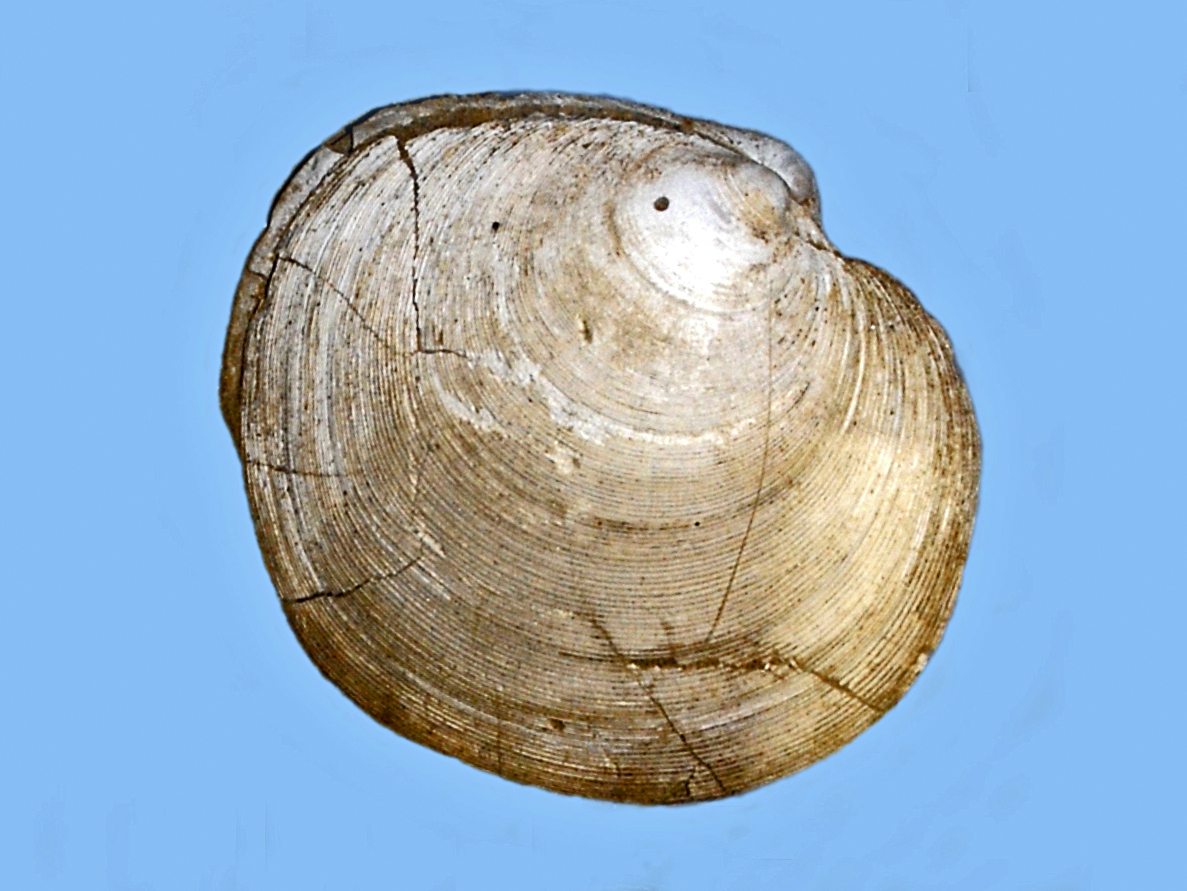
- Fossil shell of the Cretaceous-modern marine venus clam Dosinia
  Dosinia
  - †Dosinia acetabulum
  - †Dosinia discus
- Dosinidia
  - †Dosinidia elegans
- †Dossetia
  - †Dossetia hyalina
- †Druidia – type locality for genus
  - †Druidia wilsoni – type locality for species

== E ==
- †Eburneopecten
  - †Eburneopecten scintillatus
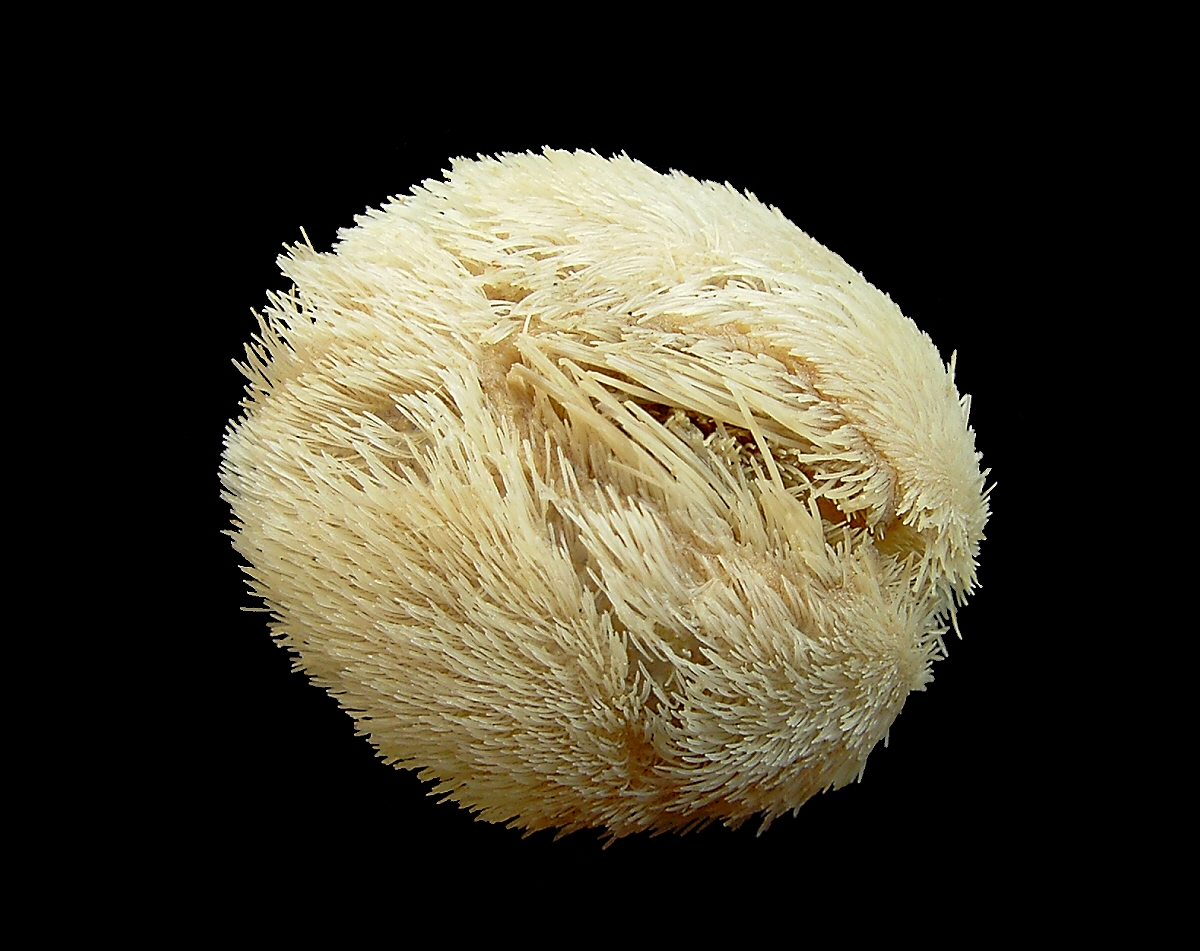
- Shell of an Echinocardium, or heart urchin
  Echinocardium
  - †Echinocardium kelloggi
- Echinocyamus
  - †Echinocyamus bisexus
  - †Echinocyamus parvus
- Echinocythereis
  - †Echinocythereis leecreekensis
  - †Echinocythereis planibasalis
- †Echinocytheris
- Echinolampas
  - †Echinolampas appendiculata
  - †Echinolampas appendiculatus
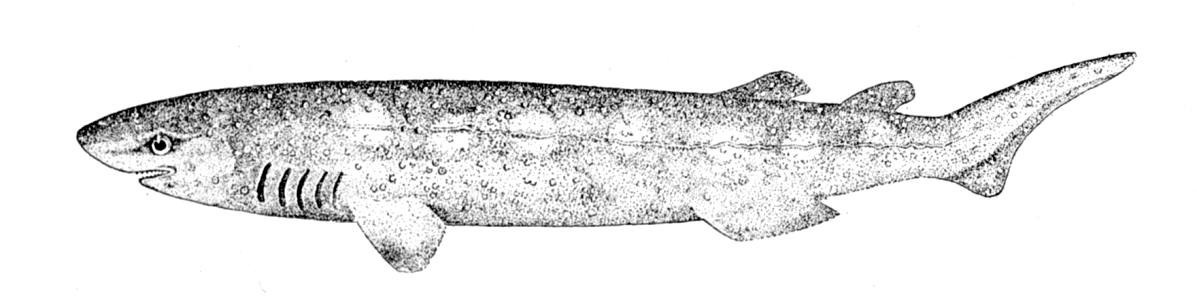
- Illustration of a living Echinorhinus shark
  Echinorhinus
  - †Echinorhinus blakei – or unidentified comparable form
- †Ecphora
  - †Ecphora aurora
  - †Ecphora pamlico
  - †Ecphora tampaensis
  - †Ecphora tricostata
  - †Ecphora wheeleri – type locality for species
- †Ectopistes
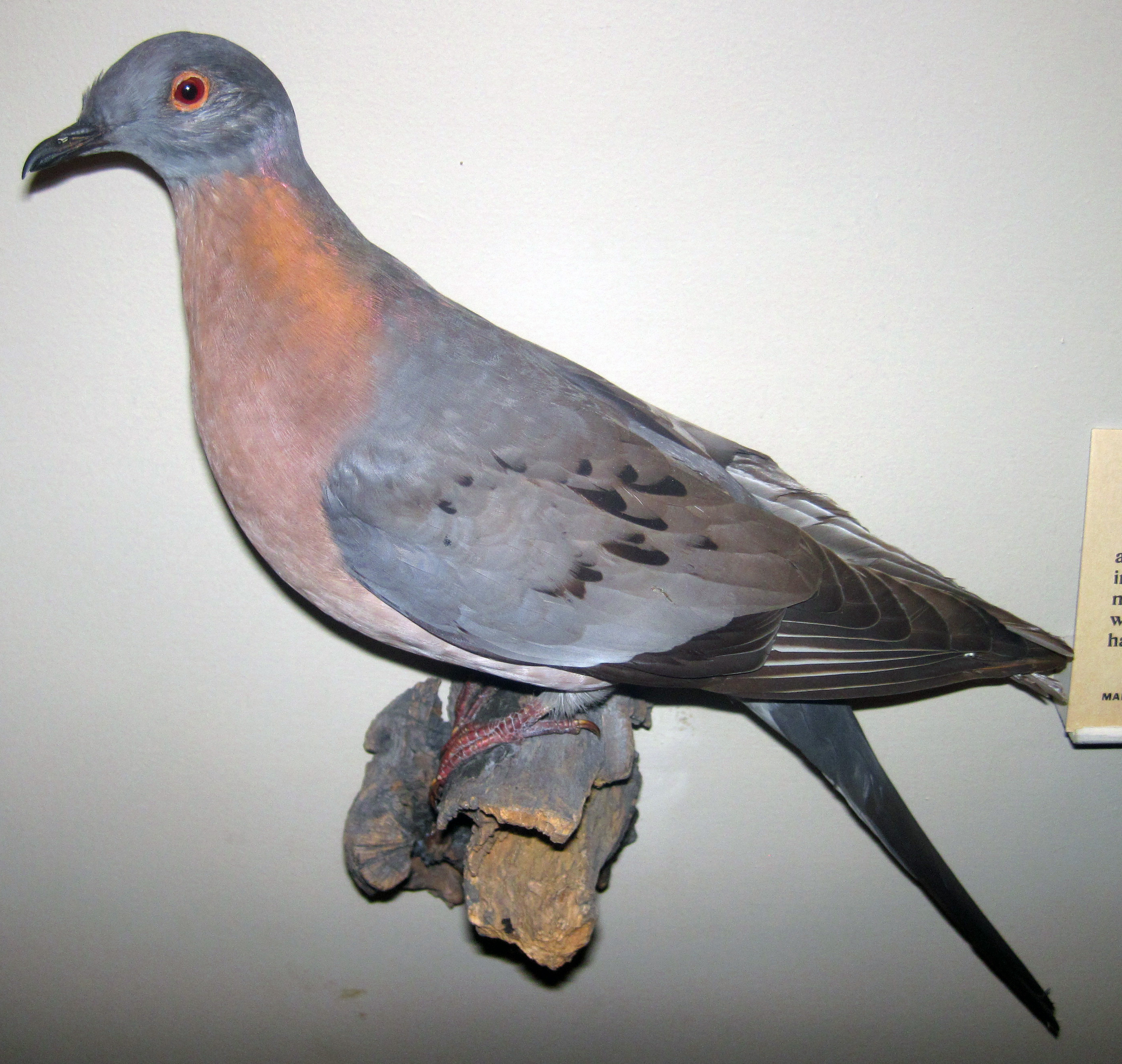
  - Taxidermied male Ectopistes migratorius, or passenger pigeon
    †Ectopistes migratorius – or unidentified related form
- Electra
- Elphidium
  - †Elphidium clavatum
  - †Elphidium gunteri
  - †Elphidium limatulum
  - †Elphidium neocrespinae
- Emarginula
- Encope
  - †Encope macrophora
- †Endictya
  - †Endictya robusta
- Endopachys
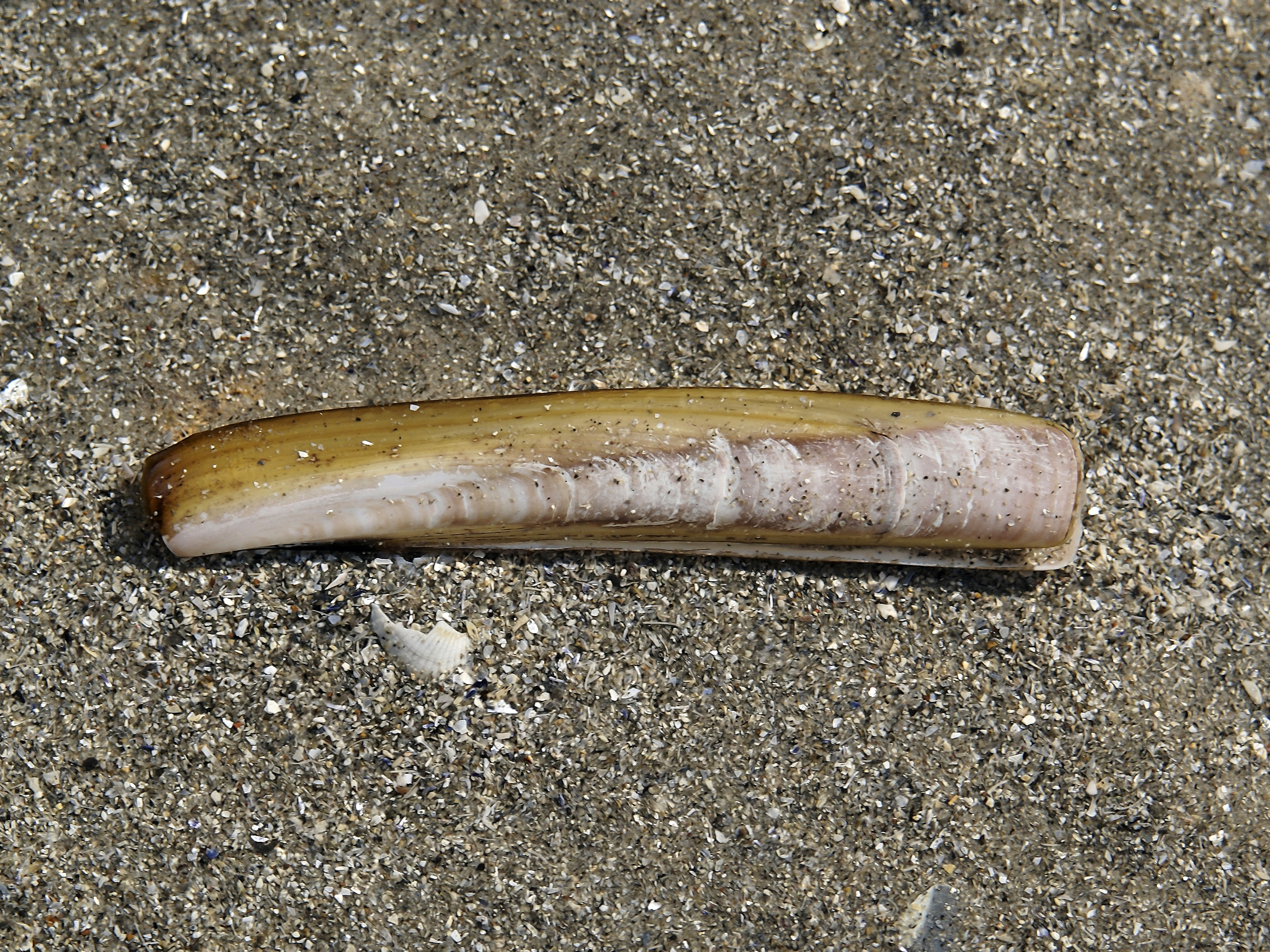
- Interior of the shell of an Ensis leei, or Atlantic jackknife clam
  Ensis
  - †Ensis directus
  - †Ensis veritis
- Ensitellops
  - †Ensitellops elongata
  - †Ensitellops protexta
- †Eocarpilius
  - †Eocarpilius blowi – type locality for species
- †Eoepondilla
  - †Eoepondilla hemisphaericus – or unidentified comparable form
- Eontia
  - †Eontia ponderosa
- Epinephelus
- Epistominella
  - †Epistominella danvillensis
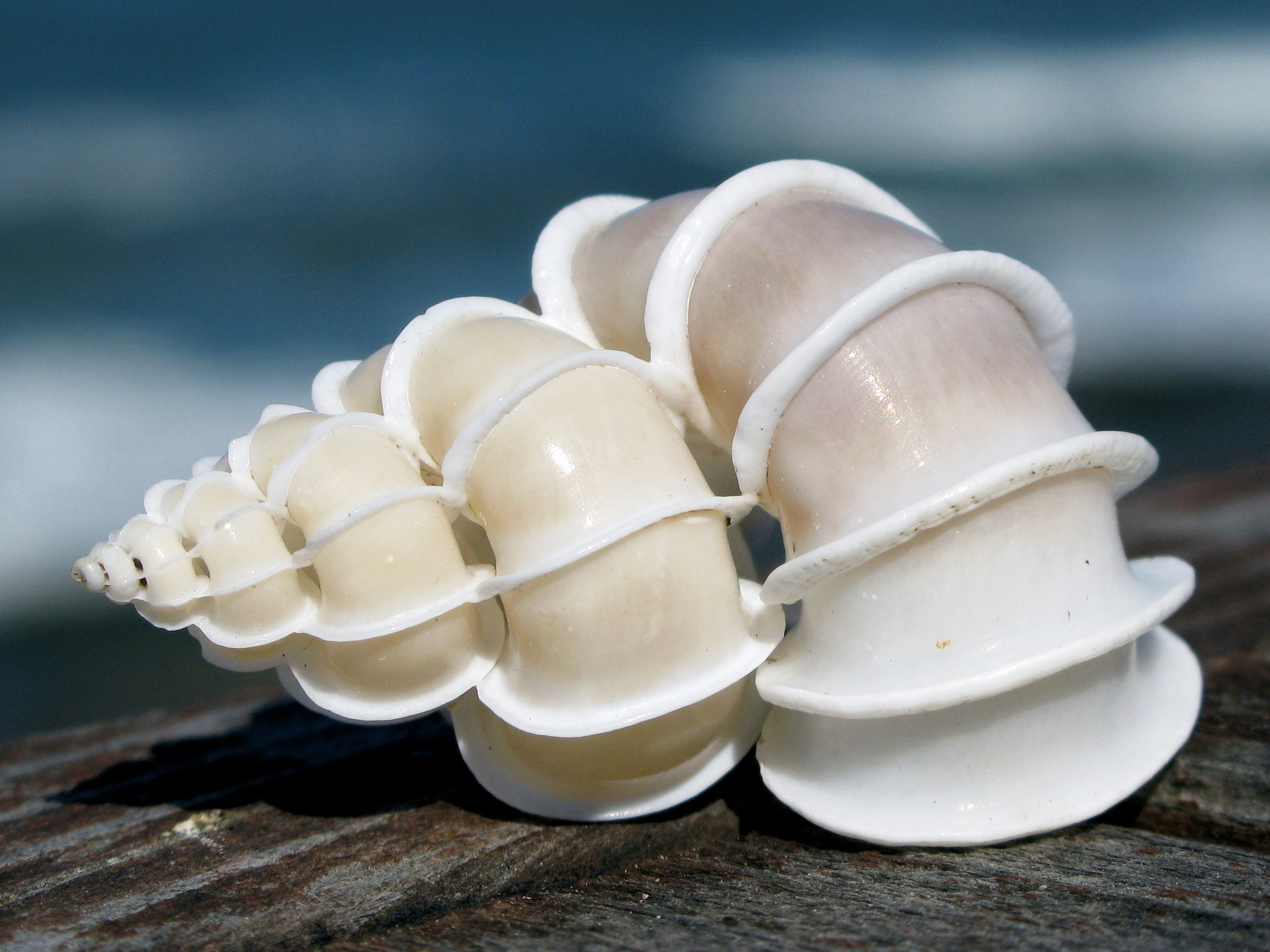
- Shell of an Epitonium wentletrap sea snail
  Epitonium
  - †Epitonium aequabile – type locality for species
  - †Epitonium apiculatum
  - †Epitonium carolinae
  - †Epitonium dignitate
  - †Epitonium dignitatis – type locality for species
  - †Epitonium fasciatum
  - †Epitonium fractum
  - †Epitonium humphreysii
  - †Epitonium junceum
  - †Epitonium leai
  - †Epitonium pratti
  - †Epitonium robesonense
  - †Epitonium rupicola
  - †Epitonium sohli
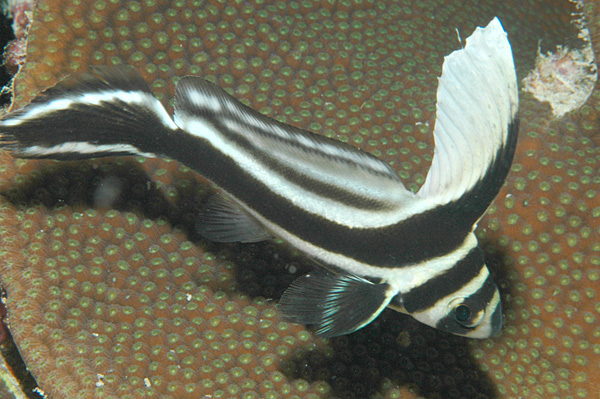
- A living Equetus punctatus, or spotted drum
  Equetus
  - †Equetus umbrosus – or unidentified comparable form
- Ervilia
  - †Ervilia lata
- Erycina
  - †Erycina carolinensis
- †Erycinella
  - †Erycinella ovalis
- Eucalathis
- Eucrassatella – tentative report
- †Eucymba
- Eucythere
  - †Eucythere declivus
  - †Eucythere f informal
  - †Eucythere gibba
  - †Eucythere triangulata
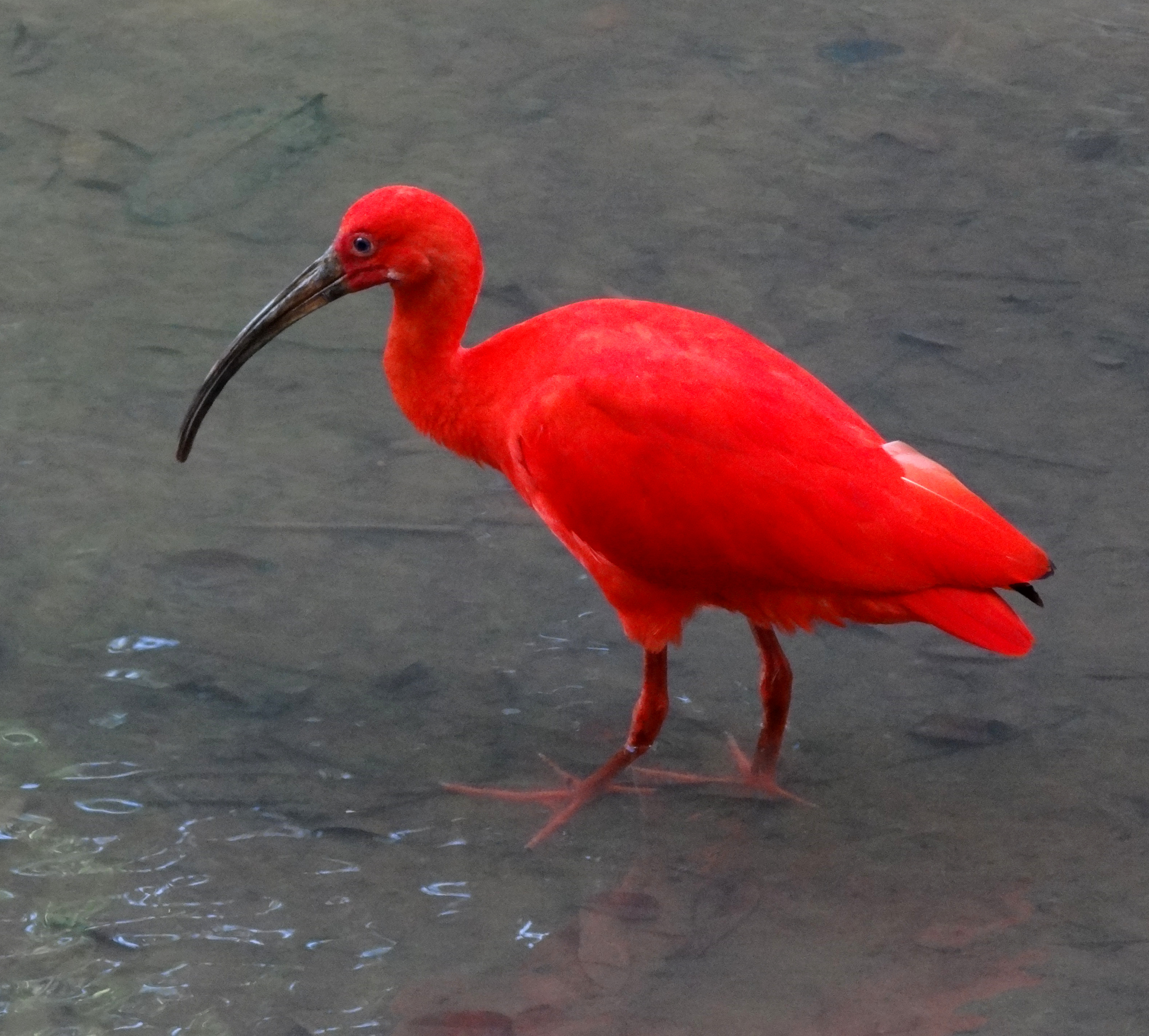
- A living Eudocimus ibis
  Eudocimus
- Eulima
  - †Eulima juncea
- †Eupatagas
  - †Eupatagas carolinensis
- Eupatagus
  - †Eupatagus carolinensis
  - †Eupatagus lawsonae
  - †Eupatagus wilsoni
- Eupleura
  - †Eupleura caudata
- †Eurhodia
  - †Eurhodia baumi
  - †Eurhodia depressa
  - †Eurhodia holmesi
  - †Eurhodia ideali
  - †Eurhodia rugosa
- Eurytellina
  - †Eurytellina alternata
- †Euscalpellum
  - †Euscalpellum carolinensis
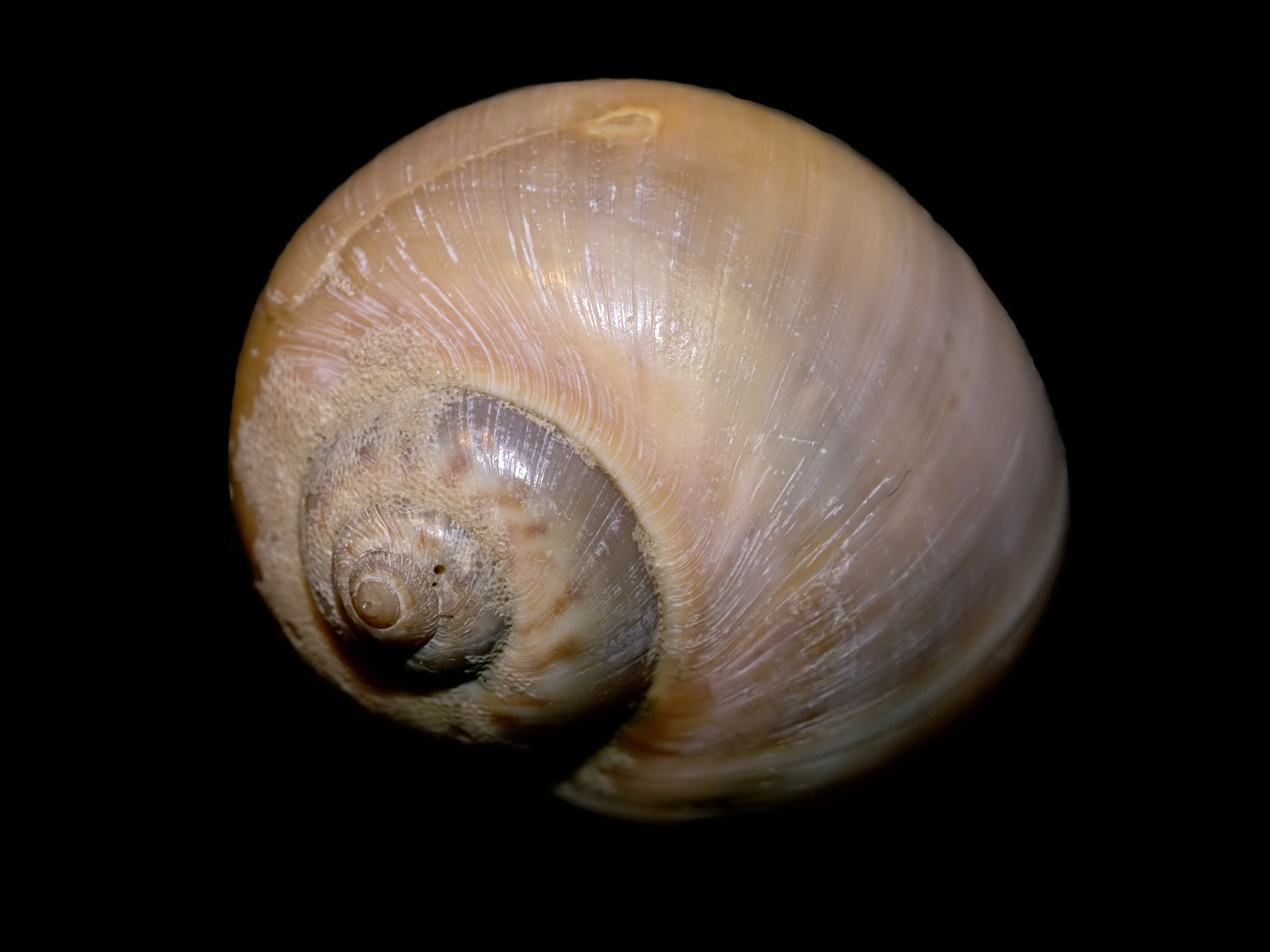
- Shell of a Euspira moon sea snail
  Euspira
  - †Euspira heros
  - †Euspira vicksburgensis
- †Eutrephoceras
  - †Eutrephoceras berryi
  - †Eutrephoceras carolinense
  - †Eutrephoceras carolinensis
- Euvola
  - †Euvola raveneli
- †Evilia
  - †Evilia lata
- †Exanthesis
  - †Exanthesis ovatus – type locality for species

== F ==
- Fabella
  - †Fabella calpix
- Fasciolaria
  - †Fasciolaria cronlyensis
  - †Fasciolaria elegans
  - †Fasciolaria sparrowi
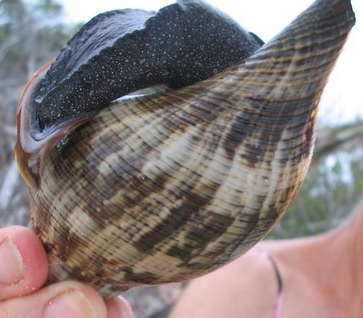
  - A living Fasciolaria tulipa, or true tulip sea snail
    †Fasciolaria tulipa
- Fenimorea
  - †Fenimorea polygonalis
- †Ficopsis
- Ficus
  - †Ficus affinis
  - †Ficus communis
  - †Ficus harrisi – or unidentified comparable form
  - †Ficus mississippiensis
- Flabellum
- †Florilus
  - †Florilus spissus
- Fratercula
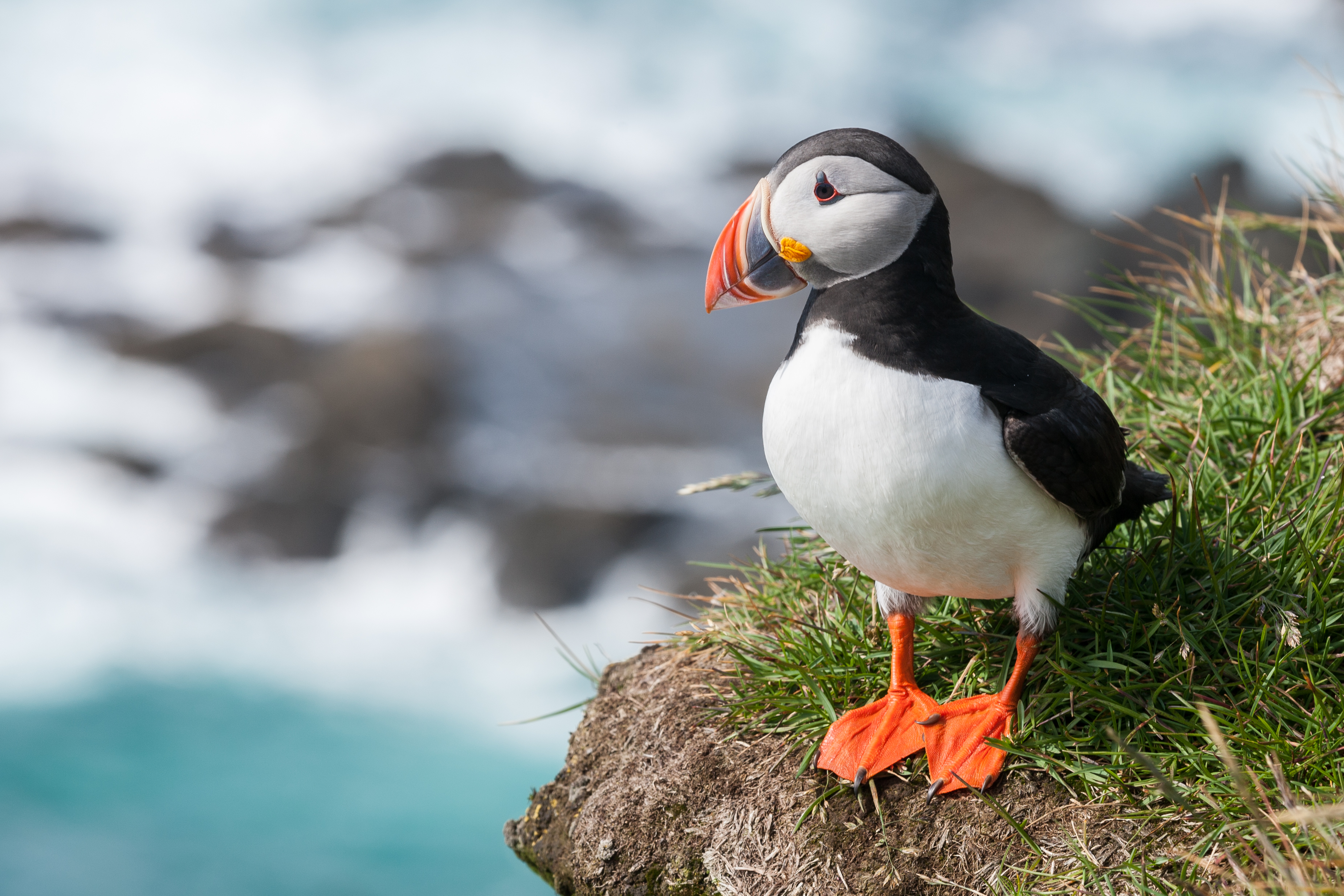
  - A living Fratercula arctica, or Atlantic puffin
    †Fratercula arctica – or unidentified related form
  - †Fratercula cirrhata – or unidentified related form
- †Fraxinus
- Fulgurofusus
  - †Fulgurofusus elongatus
- Fusimitra
- Fusinus
  - †Fusinus abruptus
  - †Fusinus exilis
  - †Fusinus heilprini
  - †Fusinus hoffmani

== G ==
- Gadus
  - †Gadus morhua – or unidentified comparable form
- Galeocerdo
  - †Galeocerdo aduncas
  - †Galeocerdo contortus
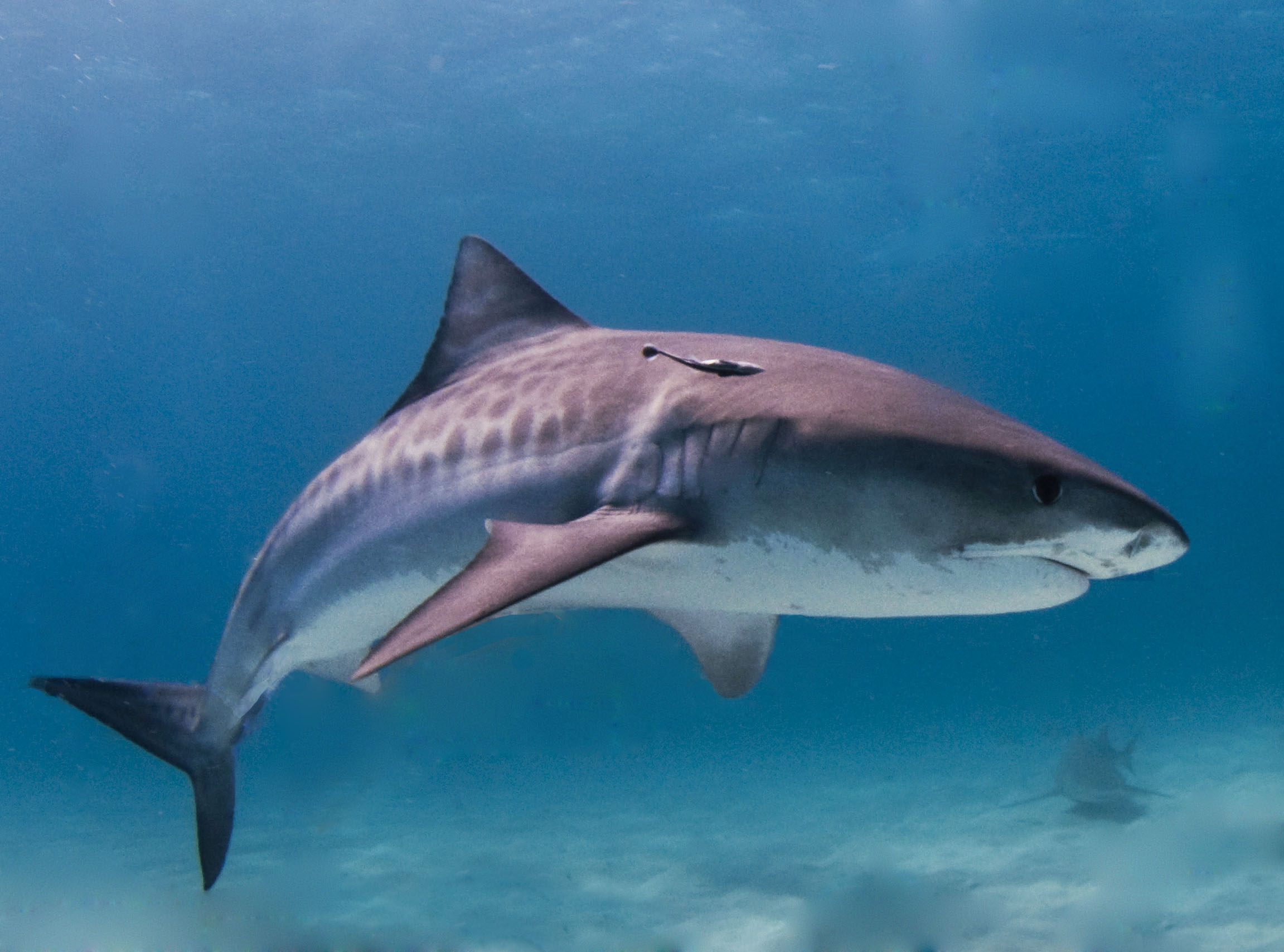
  - A living Galeocerdo cuvier, or tiger shark
    †Galeocerdo cuvier – or unidentified comparable form
- Galeodea
  - †Galeodea britti – type locality for species
- Galeorhinus
  - †Galeorhinus affinis
  - †Galeorhinus galeus
  - †Galeorhinus latus
- Gari
  - †Gari eborea
- Gastrochaena
- Gavia
  - †Gavia concinna
  - †Gavia egeriana
  - †Gavia fortis – type locality for species
  - †Gavia howardae
- Gemma
  - †Gemma cravenensis
  - †Gemma gemma
  - †Gemma magna
- Geochelone
- Geodia
  - †Geodia harmatuki – type locality for species
- Gibbolucina
  - †Gibbolucina pandata – or unidentified comparable form
- †Gigantostrea
  - †Gigantostrea trigonalis
- Ginglymostoma
- †Glabocythara
- †Gledistia
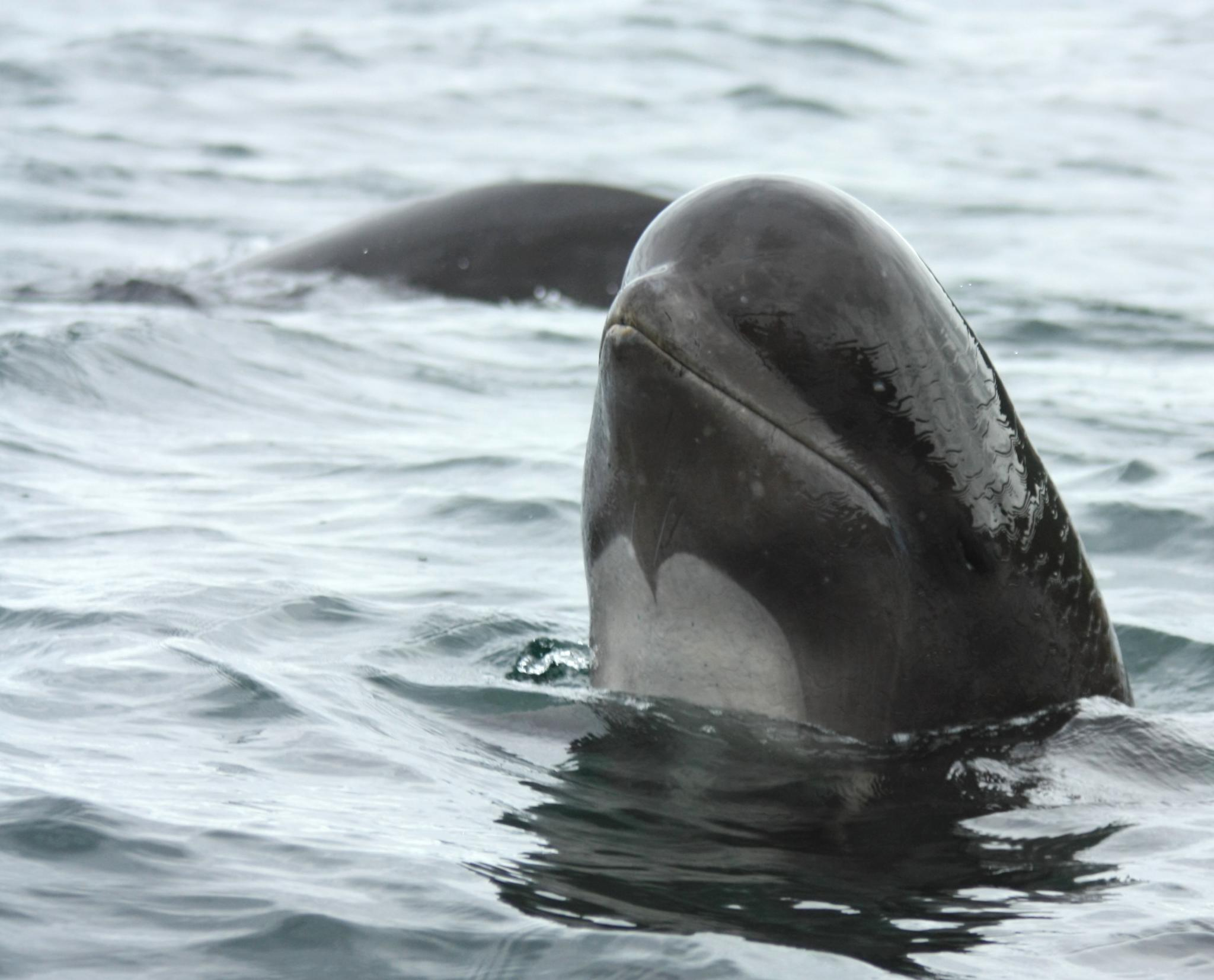
- A living Globicephala, or pilot whale
  Globicephala
- Globigerina
  - †Globigerina anguliofficinalis – or unidentified comparable form
  - †Globigerina apertura
  - †Globigerina bulloides
  - †Globigerina calida
  - †Globigerina decoraperta
  - †Globigerina euapertura
  - †Globigerina falconensis
  - †Globigerina juvenilis
  - †Globigerina woodi
- Globigerinita
  - †Globigerinita altiaperturus
  - †Globigerinita glutinata
  - †Globigerinita uvula
- Globigerinoides
  - †Globigerinoides bollii
  - †Globigerinoides conglobatus
  - †Globigerinoides obiquus
  - †Globigerinoides obliquus
  - †Globigerinoides quadrilobatus
  - †Globigerinoides ruber
- Globivenus
  - †Globivenus judithae
  - †Globivenus lockei
- †Globoquadrina
  - †Globoquadrina altispira
  - †Globoquadrina venezuelana
- Globorotalia
  - †Globorotalia acostaensis
  - †Globorotalia crassula
  - †Globorotalia cultrata
  - †Globorotalia hexagona
  - †Globorotalia hirsuta
  - †Globorotalia margaritae
  - †Globorotalia menardii
  - †Globorotalia praeoscitans
  - †Globorotalia puncticulata
  - †Globorotalia scitula
  - †Globorotalia truncatulinoides – or unidentified comparable form
- Glossus
  - †Glossus fraterna
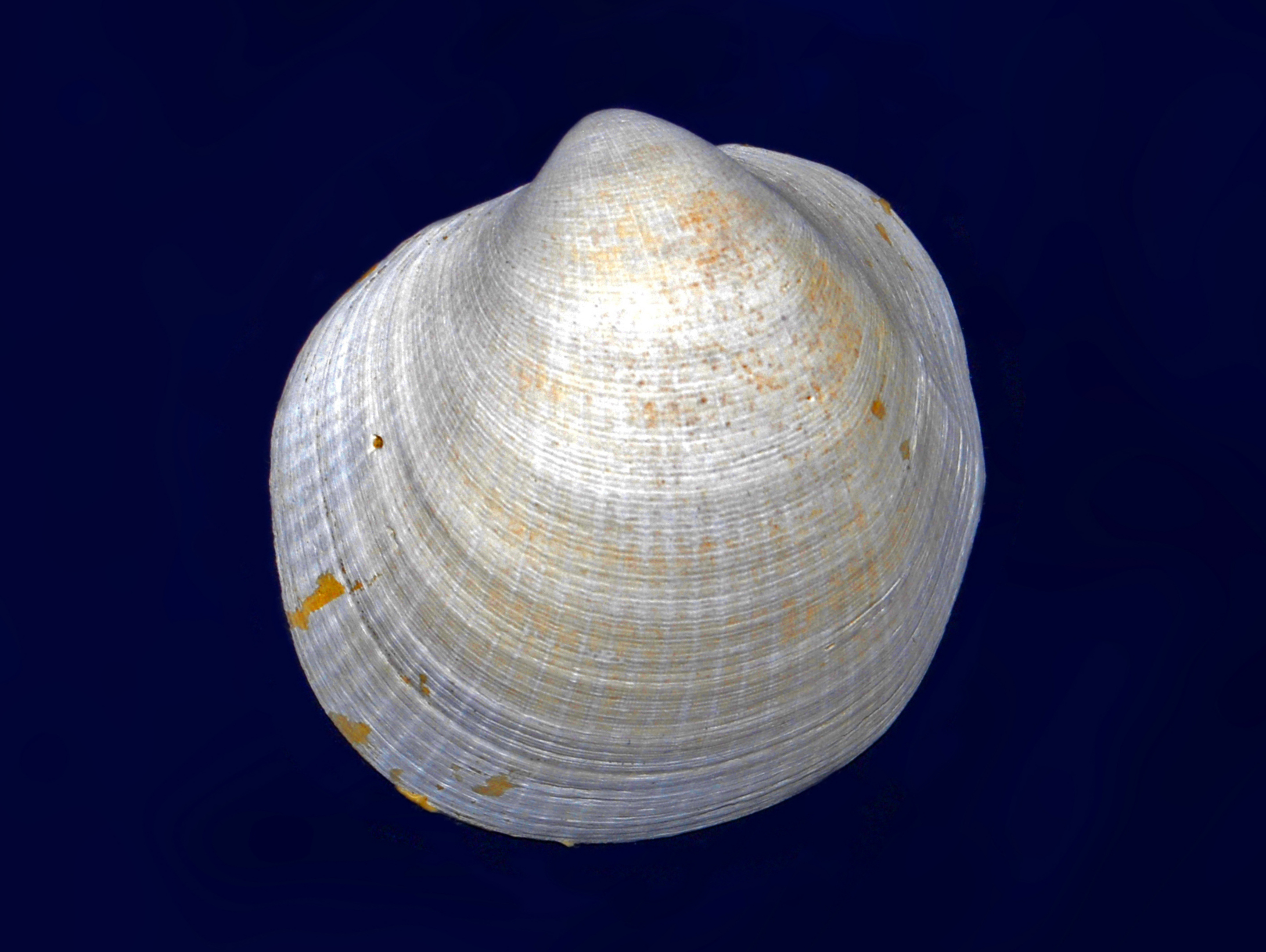
- Fossilized shell of a Glycymeris, or bittersweet clam
  Glycymeris
  - †Glycymeris americana
  - †Glycymeris anteparilis – type locality for species
  - †Glycymeris cookei – or unidentified related form
  - †Glycymeris duplinensis
  - †Glycymeris duplinicus – or unidentified comparable form
  - †Glycymeris hummi
  - †Glycymeris sloani
  - †Glycymeris tumulus
- Glyphostoma
  - †Glyphostoma scoptes
  - †Glyphostoma zoster
- Glyphoturris
  - †Glyphoturris eritima
- Glyptoactis
  - †Glyptoactis nasuta – tentative report
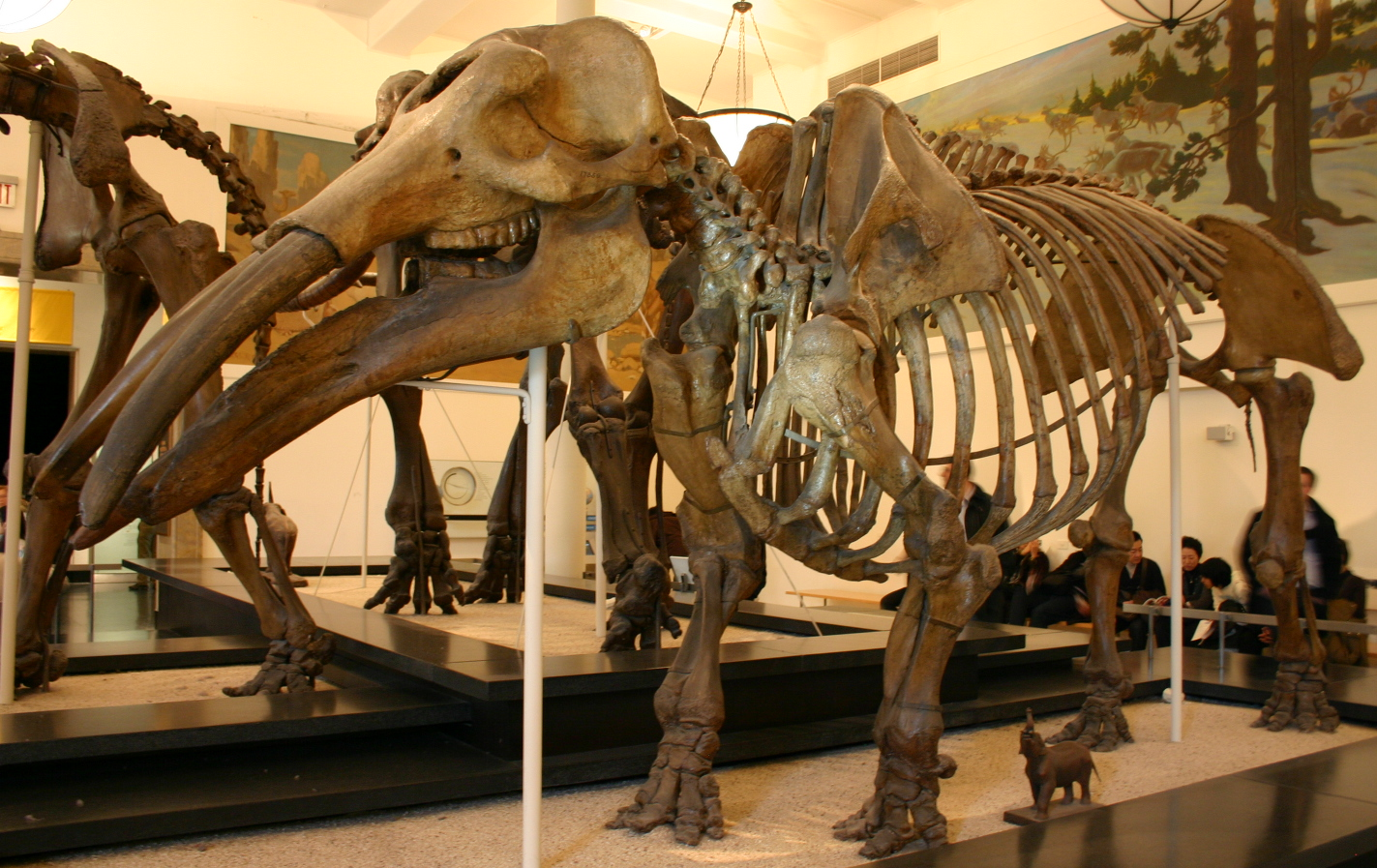
- Mounted fossilized skeleton of the Miocene-Pleistocene elephant relative Gomphotherium
  †Gomphotherium
- †Goniothecium
  - †Goniothecium rogersii
- Gouldia
  - †Gouldia metastriata
  - †Gouldia platycostata – type locality for species
- Granulina
  - †Granulina ovuliformis
- †Gricetoides – type locality for genus
  - †Gricetoides aurorae – type locality for species
- Grus
  - †Grus americana – or unidentified related form
  - †Grus antigone – or unidentified related form
- †Gryphaeostrea
  - †Gryphaeostrea vomer
- †Gryphoca
  - †Gryphoca similis
- Gyroidinoides
  - †Gyroidinoides octocameratus

== H ==
- †Hadrosaurus
  - †Hadrosaurus tripos – type locality for species
- Haematopus
  - †Haematopus ostralegus – or unidentified related form
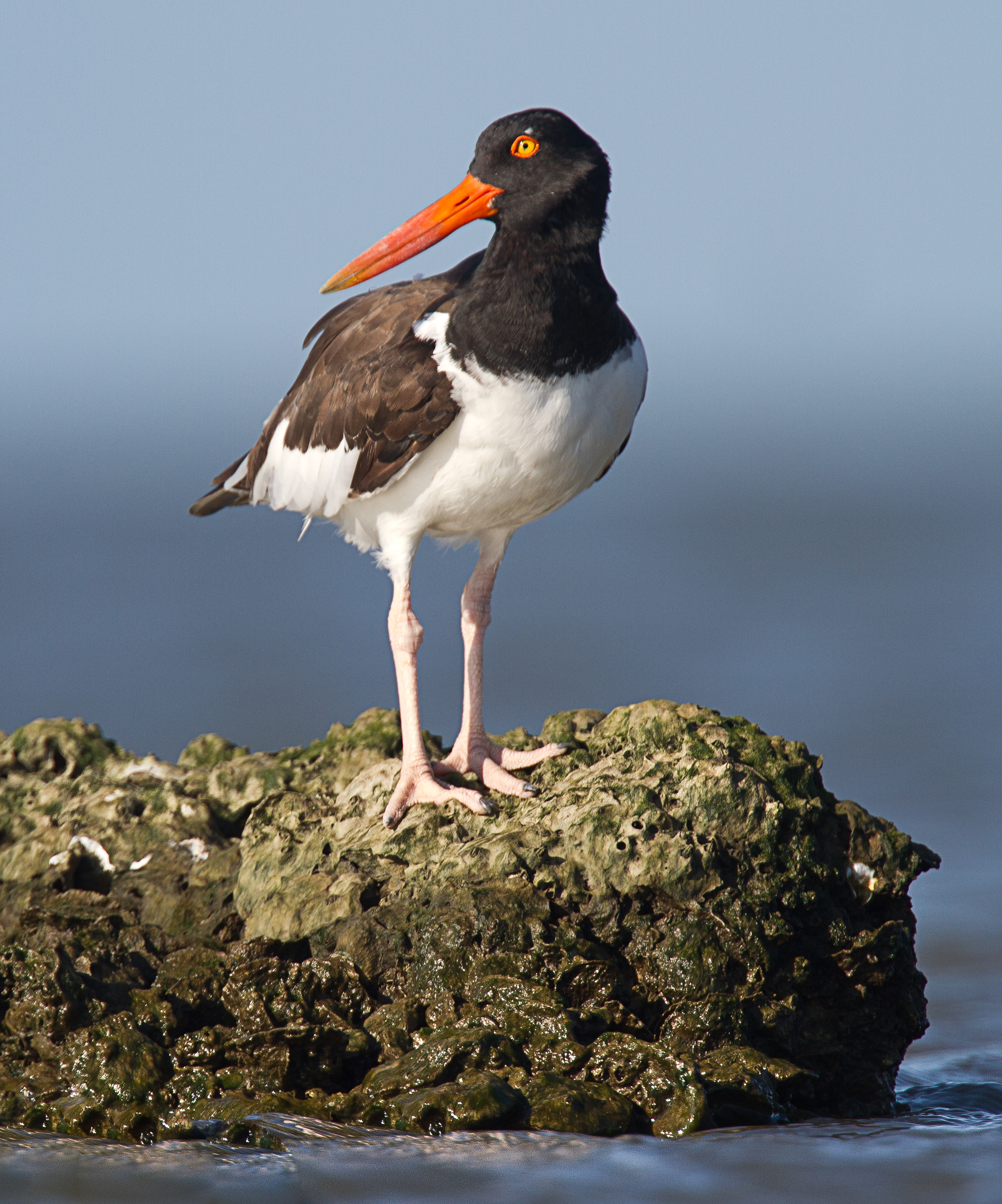
  - A living Haematopus palliatus, or American oystercatcher
    †Haematopus palliatus – or unidentified related form
- Halicalyptra
  - †Halicalyptra picassoi
- Hanzawaia
  - †Hanzawaia concentrica
- Haplocytheridea
  - †Haplocytheridea perarcuata – or unidentified comparable form
- Harvella
- Hastigerina
  - †Hastigerina siphonifera
- Haustator – tentative report
  - †Haustator zulloi – type locality for species
- †Haynespongia – type locality for genus
  - †Haynespongia vokesae – type locality for species
- †Hazelina – type locality for genus
  - †Hazelina bisbifurcata – type locality for species
  - †Hazelina conleycreekensis
- Heilprinia
  - †Heilprinia carolinensis
- †Heliornis
  - †Heliornis fulica – or unidentified related form
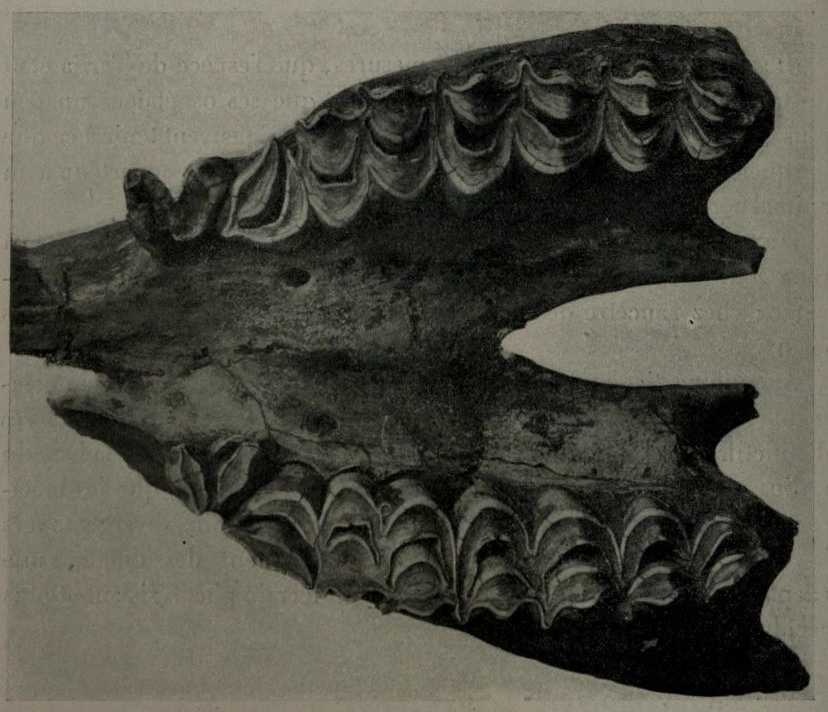
- Fossilized lower jaw of the Miocene-Pleistocene llama relative Hemiauchenia
  †Hemiauchenia – or unidentified comparable form
- †Hemiaulus
  - †Hemiaulus polymorphus – or unidentified comparable form
- Hemimactra
  - †Hemimactra duplinensis
  - †Hemimactra modicella
  - †Hemimactra solidissima
- Hemipristis
  - †Hemipristis serra
  - †Hemipristis wyattdurhami
- †Hemirhabdorhynchus
- Hermanites
  - †Hermanites ascitus
- †Herpetocetus
  - †Herpetocetus sendaicus
  - †Herpetocetus transatlanticus – type locality for species
- Hesperibalanus
  - †Hesperibalanus kellumi
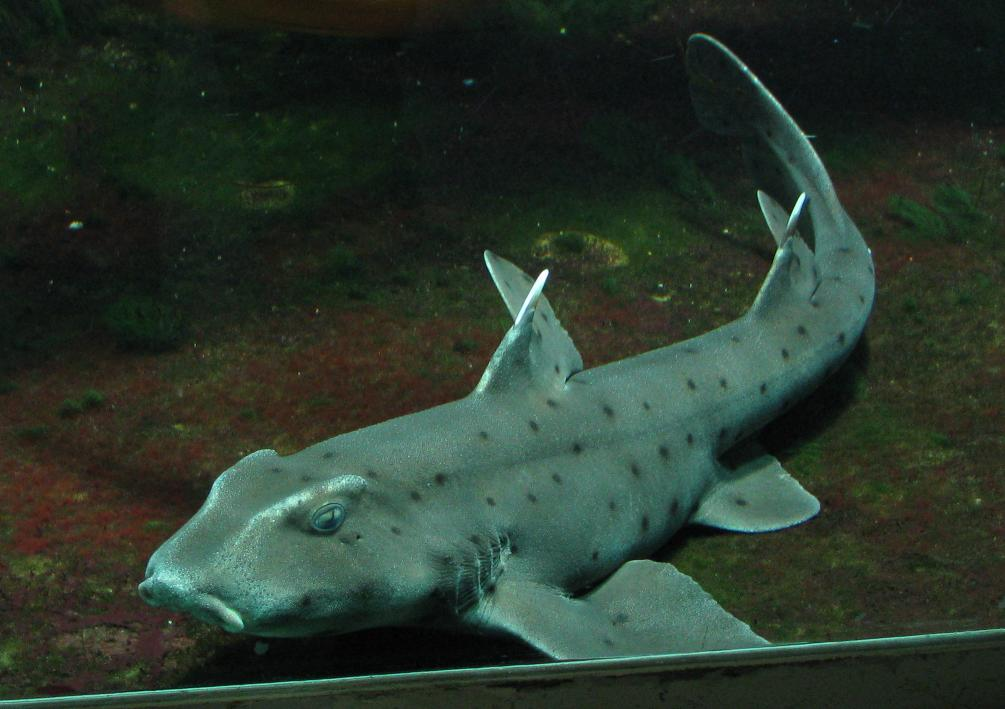
- A living Heterodontus, or bullhead shark
  Heterodontus
  - †Heterodontus janefirdae – type locality for species
- Hexanchus
- Hiatella
  - †Hiatella arctica
- Hippoporella
  - †Hippoporella gorgonensis – or unidentified comparable form
- Hippoporina
  - †Hippoporina pertusa – or unidentified comparable form
- †Hirschmannia – tentative report
  - †Hirschmannia hespera
  - †Hirschmannia quadrata
- Histrionicus
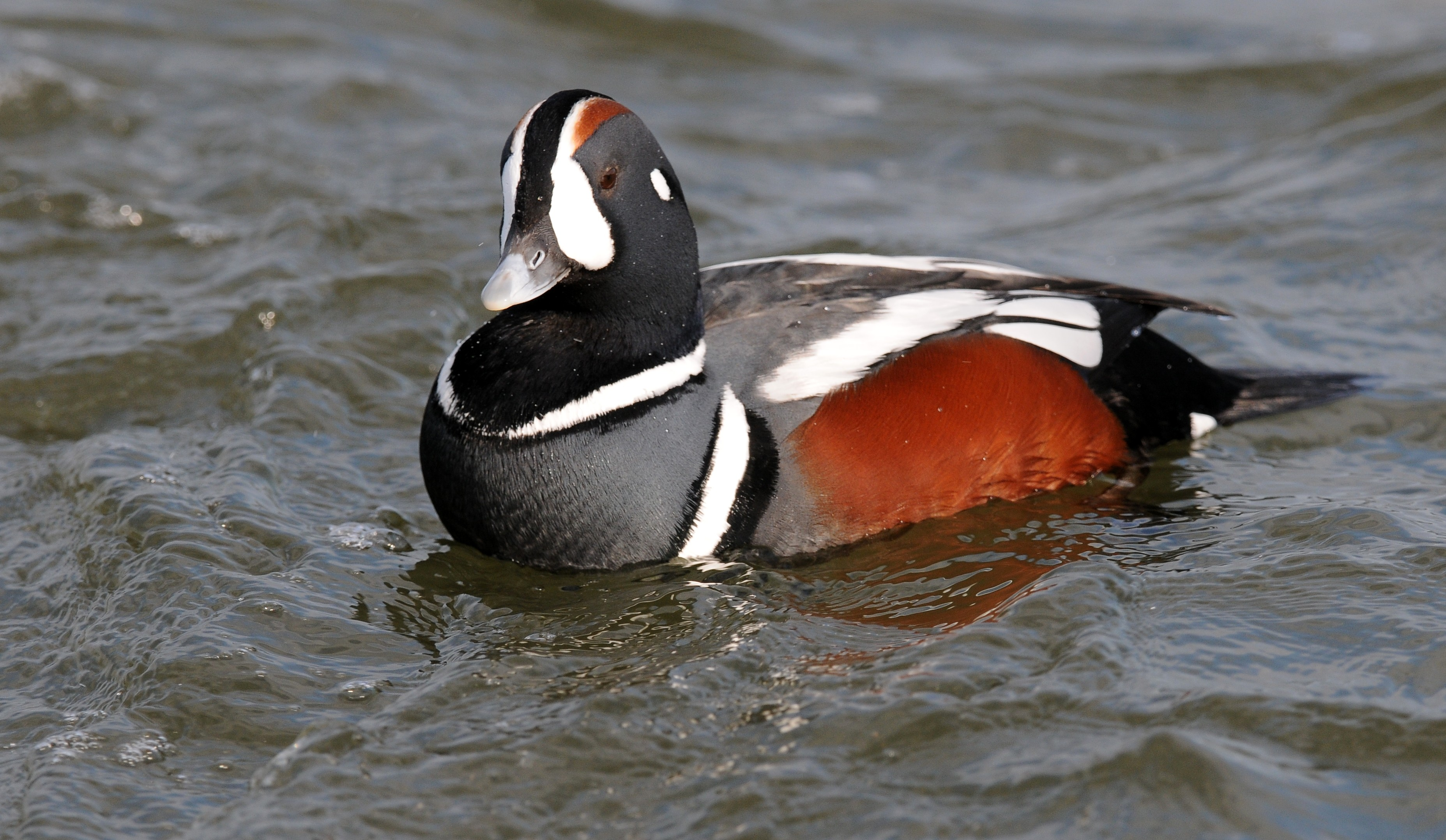
  - A living Histrionicus histrionicus, or harlequin duck
    †Histrionicus histrionicus – or unidentified related form
- †Homiphoca
  - †Homiphoca capensis
- Hulingsina
  - †Hulingsina americana
  - †Hulingsina c informal
  - †Hulingsina f informal
  - †Hulingsina glabra
  - †Hulingsina r informal
  - †Hulingsina rugipustulosa
  - †Hulingsina u informal
- Hyalina
  - †Hyalina macronuclea
- †Hyalodiscus
  - †Hyalodiscus laevis
- Hydroides – tentative report
- †Hypogaleus

== I ==
- †Idiocythere
  - †Idiocythere washingtonensis
- Illyanassa
- Ilyanassa
  - †Ilyanassa arata
  - †Ilyanassa granifera
  - †Ilyanassa harpuloides
  - †Ilyanassa harpwoides
  - †Ilyanassa irrorata
  - †Ilyanassa irrorota
  - †Ilyanassa isogramma
  - †Ilyanassa johnsoni
  - †Ilyanassa obsoleta
  - †Ilyanassa porcina – or unidentified comparable form
  - †Ilyanassa scalaspira
  - †Ilyanassa schizapyga
  - †Ilyanassa schizopyga
  - †Ilyanassa sexdentata
  - †Ilyanassa trivitta
  - †Ilyanassa trivittata
  - †Ilyanassa wilmingtonensis
- Ischadium
  - †Ischadium recurvum
- Isistius
- Isoetes
- Isognomon
- Istiophorus
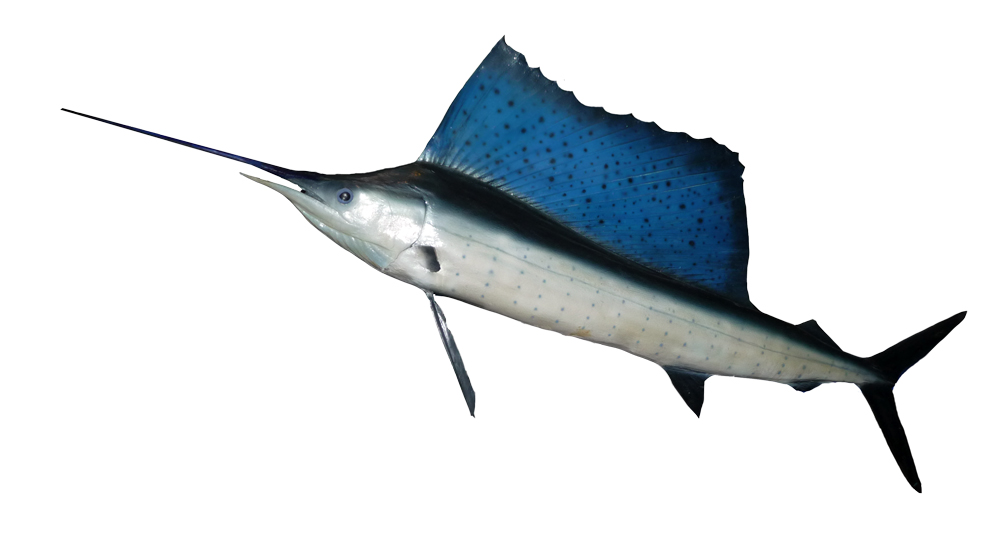
  - A living Istiophorus platypterus, or Indo-Pacific sailfish
    †Istiophorus platypterus
- Isurus
  - †Isurus americanus
  - †Isurus oxyrinchus
- Ithycythara
  - †Ithycythara psila

== J ==
- Juliacorbula
  - †Juliacorbula scutata
- Juniperus
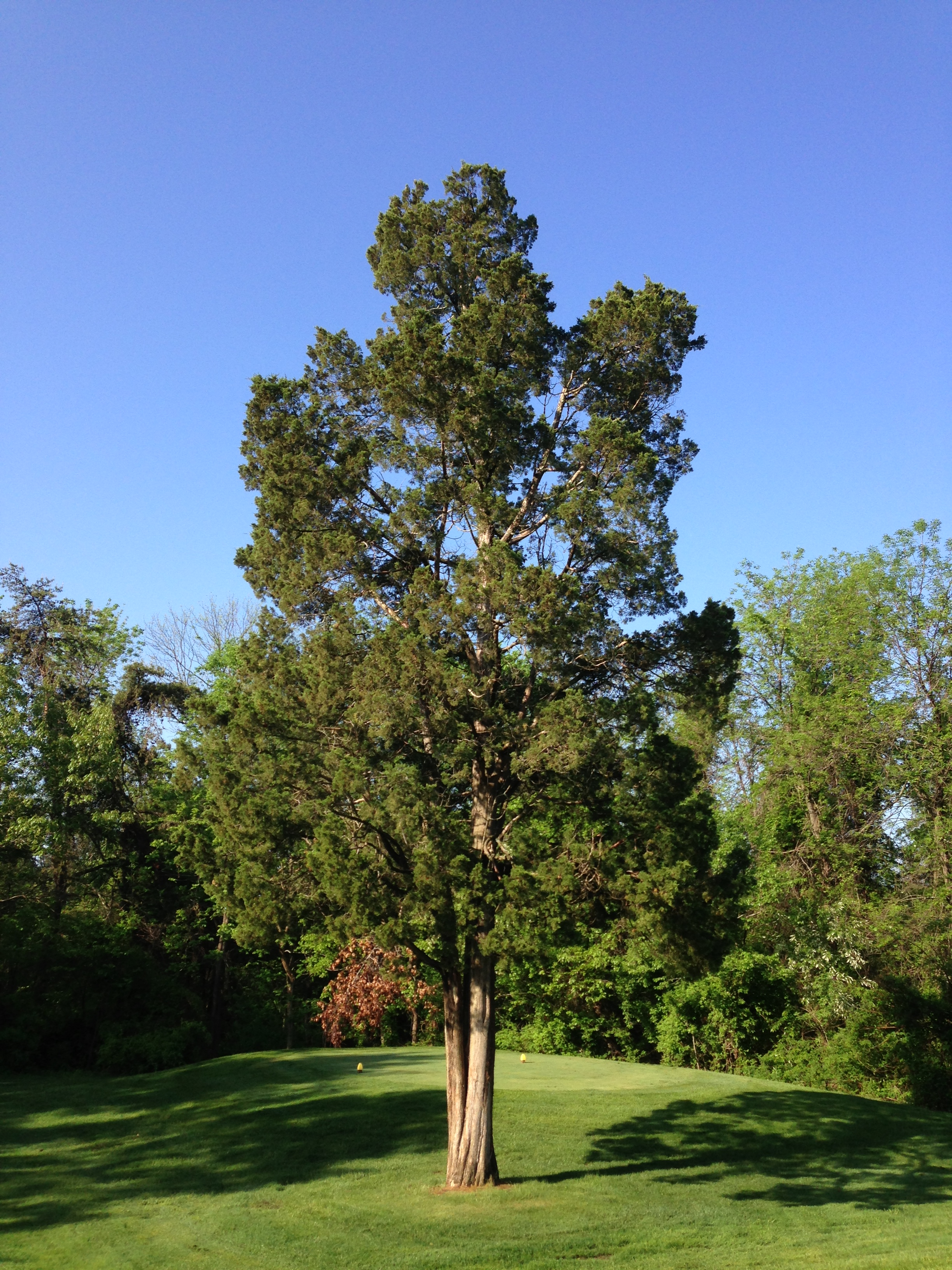
  - A living Juniperus virginiana, also known as red cedar or eastern juniper
    †Juniperus virginiana – or unidentified comparable form

== K ==
- Kalolophus
  - †Kalolophus antillarum
- †Kathetostoma
- †Kellum
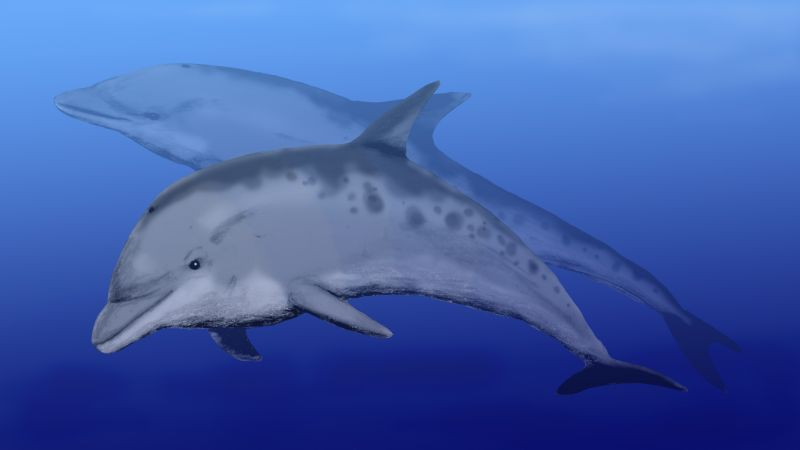
- Life restoration of the Oligocene-Miocene dolphin Kentriodon
  †Kentriodon
  - †Kentriodon schneideri – type locality for species
- †Kleidionella
  - †Kleidionella grandis
- Kogia – or unidentified comparable form
  - †Kogia breviceps
- †Kogiopsis – or unidentified comparable form
  - †Kogiopsis floridana
- Kuphus
  - †Kuphus calamus
- Kurtziella
  - †Kurtziella cerina
  - †Kurtziella cerinella
  - †Kurtziella magnoliana
- †Kyptoceras
  - †Kyptoceras amatorum

== L ==
- Laevicardium
  - †Laevicardium mortoni
  - †Laevicardium serratum
  - †Laevicardium sublineatum
- †Laevicardum
  - †Laevicardum sublineatum
- Lagena
  - †Lagena substriata
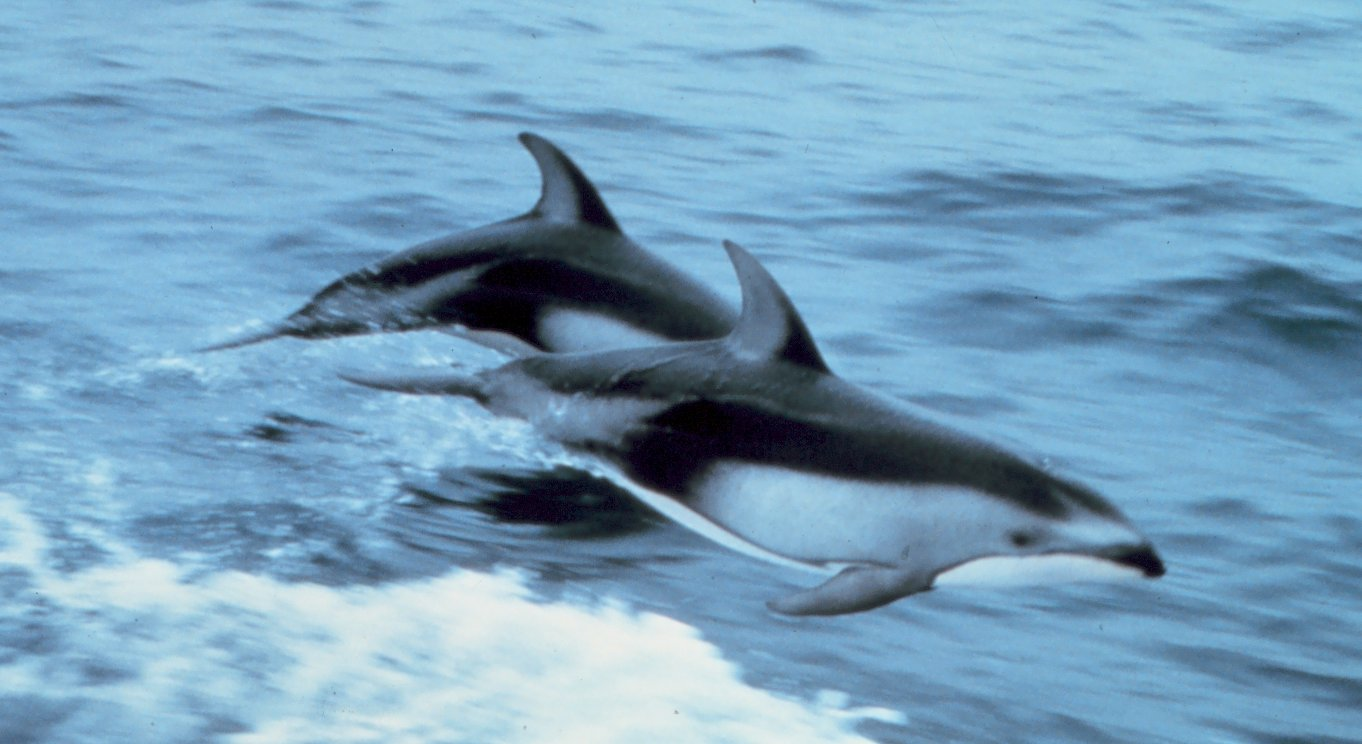
- Living Lagenorhynchus dolphins
  Lagenorhynchus
  - †Lagenorhynchus harmatuki – type locality for species
- †Lagodon
  - †Lagodon rhomboides – or unidentified comparable form
- Lamna
- †Laocoetis
  - †Laocoetis crassipes – or unidentified comparable form
- Larus
  - †Larus argentatus – or unidentified related form
  - †Larus atricilla – or unidentified related form
  - †Larus delawarensis – or unidentified related form
  - †Larus minutus – or unidentified related form
  - †Larus ribibundus
- †Leguminocythereis
  - †Leguminocythereis scarabaeus – or unidentified related form
- Leiostomus
- Lemintina
  - †Lemintina granifera
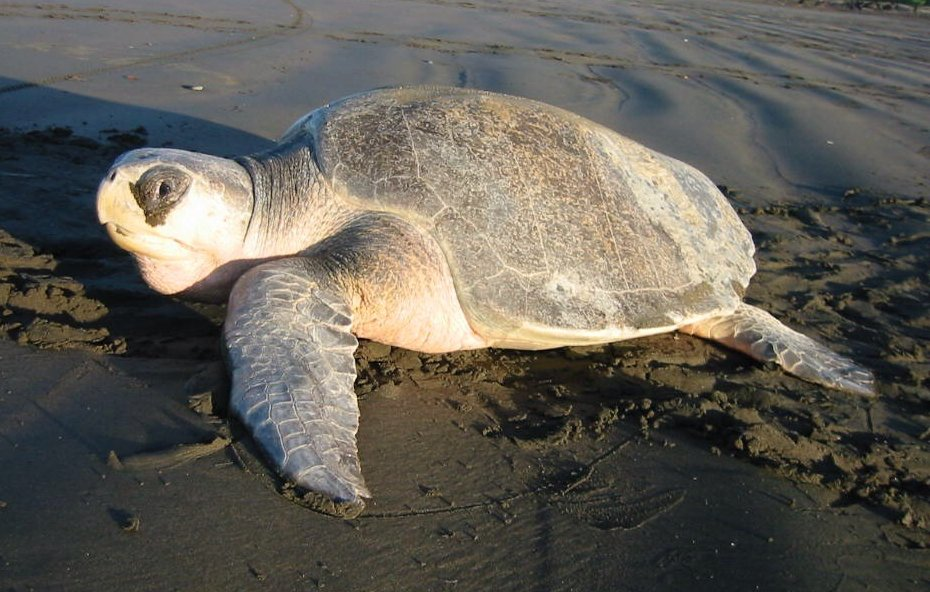
- A living Lepidochelys, or ridley sea turtle
  Lepidochelys
- †Lepophridium
  - †Lepophridium cervinum – or unidentified comparable form
- Leptocythere
  - †Leptocythere e informal
  - †Leptocythere f informal
  - †Leptocythere nikravshae
- Leptopecten
  - †Leptopecten auroraensis
- †Levifusus
  - †Levifusus spiniger
- Limaria
- Linga
  - †Linga waccamawensis
- †Linthia
  - †Linthia hanoverensis – type locality for species
  - †Linthia harmatuki
  - †Linthia wilmingtonensis
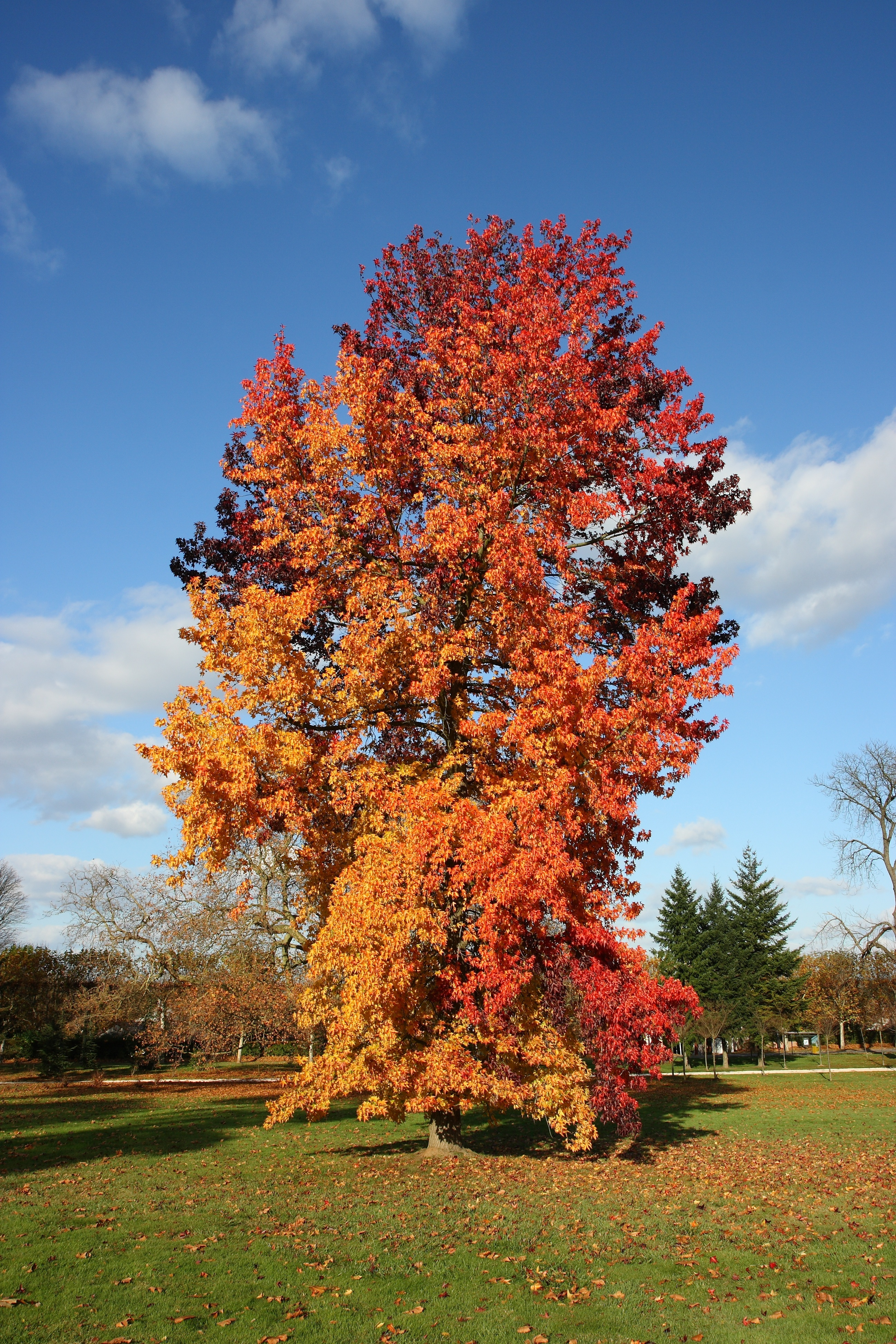
- The autumn foliage of a living Liquidambar, or sweetgum tree
  Liquidambar
- †Liradiscus
  - †Liradiscus asperulus
  - †Liradiscus bipolaris
  - †Liradiscus ovalis
- Lirophora
  - †Lirophora latilirata
- †Lithodesmium
  - †Lithodesmium minisculum
- Littoraria
  - †Littoraria irrorata
- Littorina
- †Lobonotus
  - †Lobonotus sturgeoni – type locality for species
- †Lonicera
- Lophius
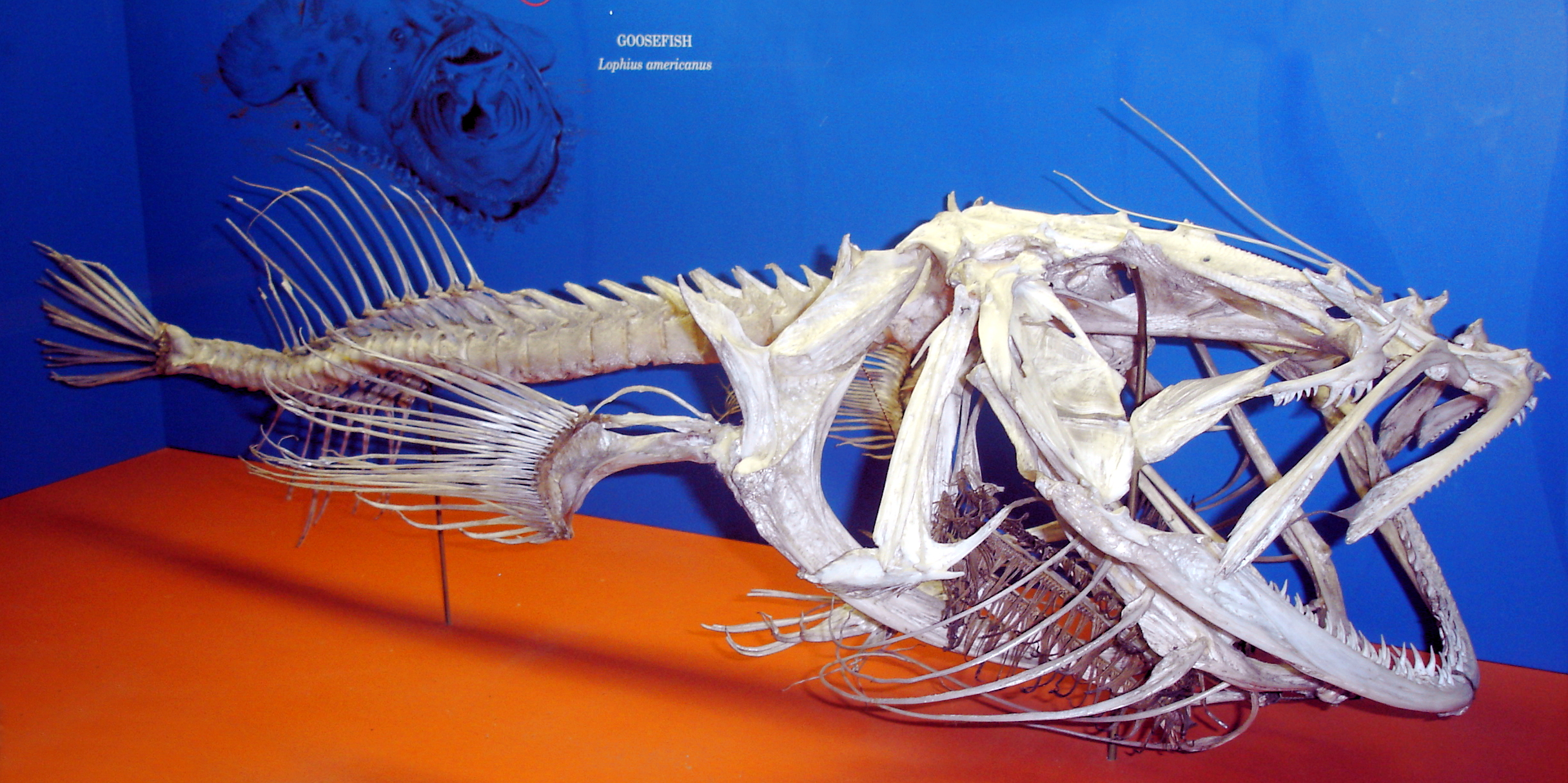
  - Mounted skeleton of a Lophius americanus, or American anglerfish
    †Lophius americanus – or unidentified comparable form
- †Lophocetus – or unidentified related form
  - †Lophocetus pappus
- Lopholatilus
  - †Lopholatilus chamaeleonticeps
  - †Lopholatilus rayus
- †Lophoranina
  - †Lophoranina raynorae
- Loxoconcha
  - †Loxoconcha c informal
  - †Loxoconcha creolensis – or unidentified comparable form
  - †Loxoconcha edentonensis
  - †Loxoconcha h informal
  - †Loxoconcha m informal
  - †Loxoconcha matagordensis
  - †Loxoconcha purisubrhomboidea
  - †Loxoconcha reticularis
  - †Loxoconcha s informal
  - †Loxoconcha t informal
- Lucina
  - †Lucina micraulax – type locality for species
  - †Lucina pensylvanica
- Lucinisca
  - †Lucinisca cribrarius
  - †Lucinisca nassula
- Lucinoma
  - †Lucinoma contracta
- Lyria
  - †Lyria carolinensis – type locality for species
  - †Lyria concinna – type locality for species
- †Lyropecten
  - †Lyropecten ernestsmithi

== M ==
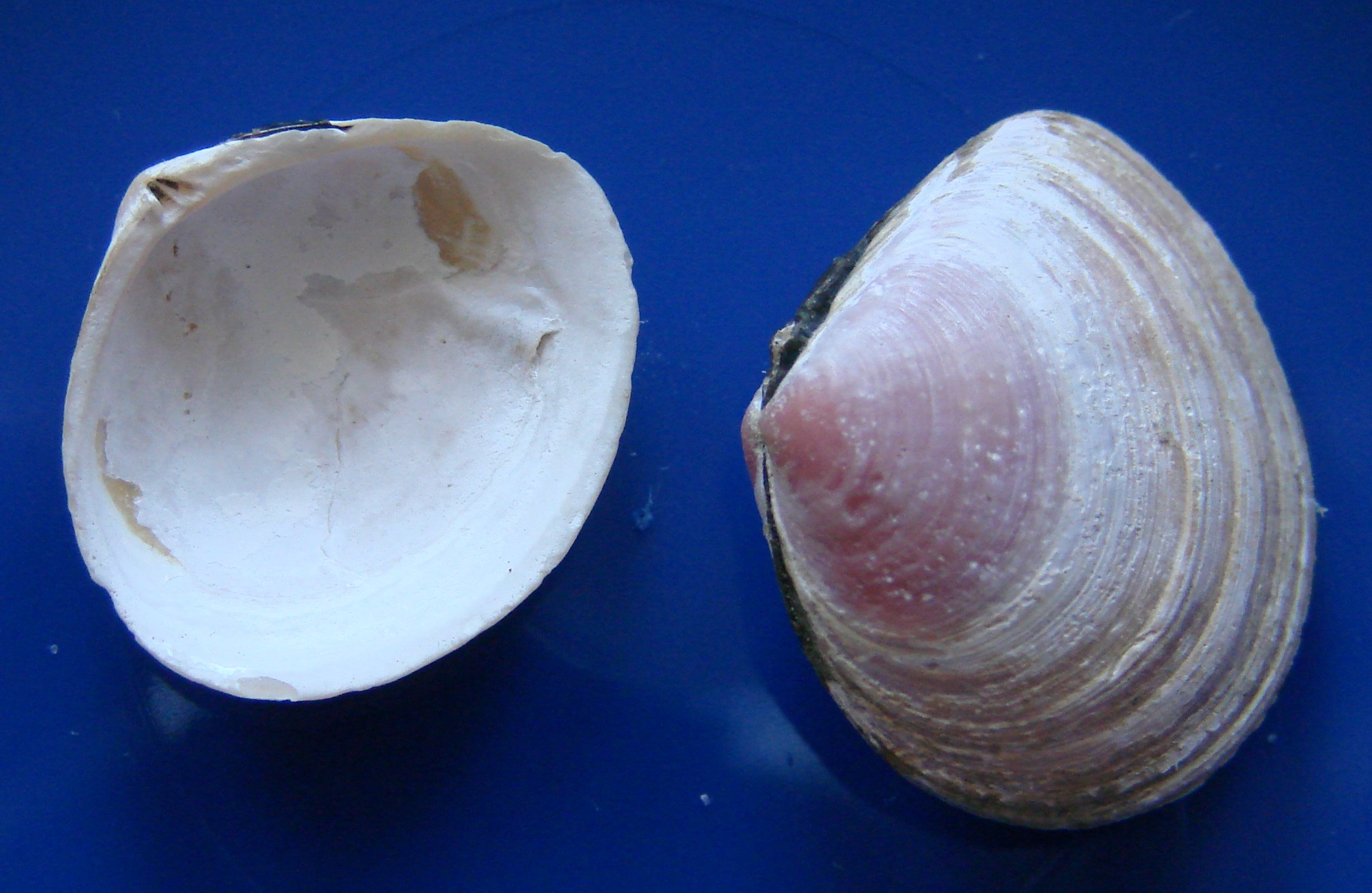
- Interior and exterior of a shell of a Macoma tellin
  Macoma
  - †Macoma carolinensis
- Macrocallista
  - †Macrocallista acuminata
  - †Macrocallista greeni
  - †Macrocallista minuscula – type locality for species
  - †Macrocallista neusensis
  - †Macrocallista nimbosa
  - †Macrocallista perovata
  - †Macrocallista reposta
  - †Macrocallista tia – type locality for species
- Macrocyprina
  - †Macrocyprina gibsonensis
- †Macromphalina
  - †Macromphalina hanseni
  - †Macromphalina pierrot
- Macropneustes
  - †Macropneustes carolinensis
- †Macrora
  - †Macrora stella
- Mactrotoma
  - †Mactrotoma fragilis
- Makaira
  - †Makaira indica
  - †Makaira nigricans
  - †Makaira purdyi – type locality for species
- Malzella
  - †Malzella conradi
  - †Malzella evexa
- †Mammut
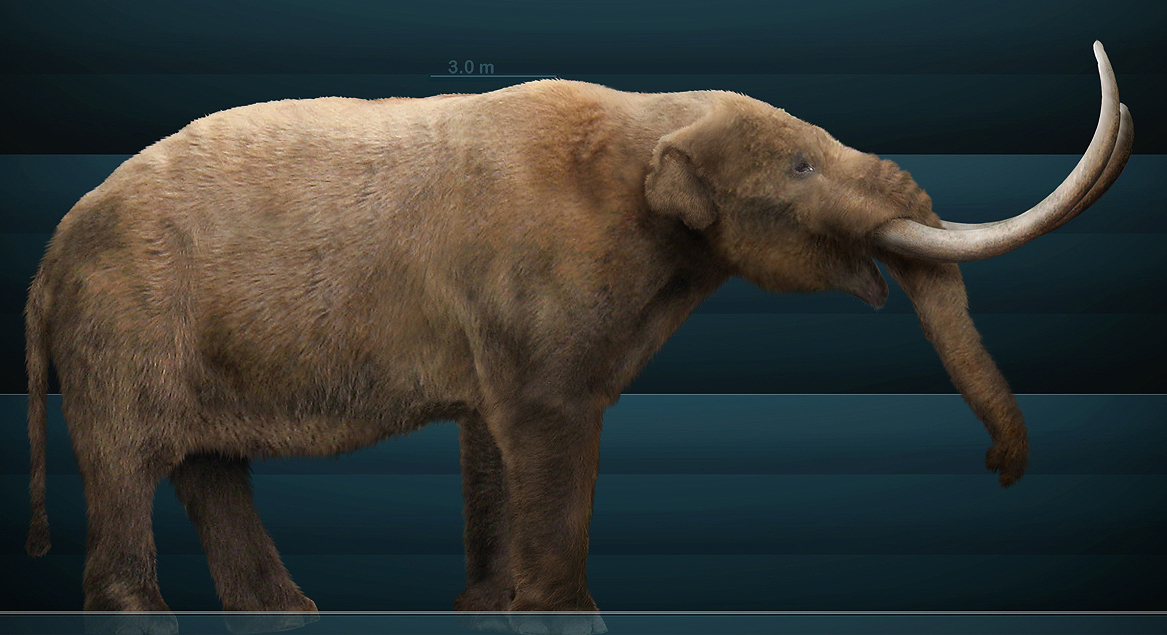
  - Restoration of a Mammut americanum, or American mastodon
    †Mammut americanum
- Manta
  - †Manta melanyae – type locality for species
- Maretia
  - †Maretia subostrata
  - †Maretia subrostrata
  - †Maretia subrostratus
- Marevalvata
  - †Marevalvata tricarinata
- Marginella
  - †Marginella denticulata
- †Marvacrassatella
  - †Marvacrassatella kauffmani
  - †Marvacrassatella turgidula – tentative report
  - †Marvacrassatella undulatus
- †Matutites
  - †Matutites miltonorum – type locality for species
- †Mclelannia
  - †Mclelannia aenigma
- †Mediaria
  - †Mediaria splendida
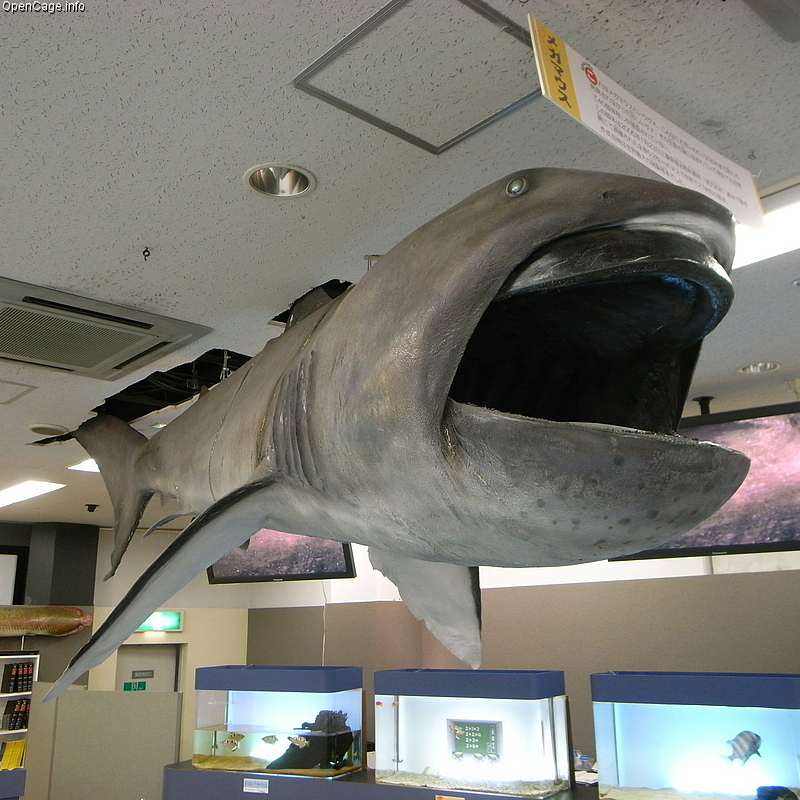
- A taxidermied Megachasma pelagios, or megamouth shark
  Megachasma
- Megalops
  - †Megalops atlanticus – or unidentified comparable form
- Megaptera
- †Megascyliorhinus
  - †Megascyliorhinus miocaenicus
- †Meherrinia – type locality for genus
  - †Meherrinia isoni – type locality for species
- Meiocardia
  - †Meiocardia carolinae
- Melanella
  - †Melanella conoidea
  - †Melanella eborea
  - †Melanella jamaicensis
- Melanitta
  - †Melanitta nigra – or unidentified related form
  - †Melanitta perspicillata – or unidentified related form
- Melanogrammus
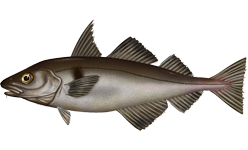
  - Illustration of a living Melanogrammus aeglefinus, or haddock
    †Melanogrammus aeglefinus – or unidentified comparable form
- Meleagris
- Mellita
  - †Mellita aclinensis – or unidentified comparable form
- †Melosira
  - †Melosira westii
- Menippe – tentative report
- Mercenaria
  - †Mercenaria campechiensis
  - †Mercenaria capax
  - †Mercenaria carolinensis
  - †Mercenaria corrugata
  - †Mercenaria druidi
  - †Mercenaria erecta – type locality for species
  - †Mercenaria gardnerae – type locality for species
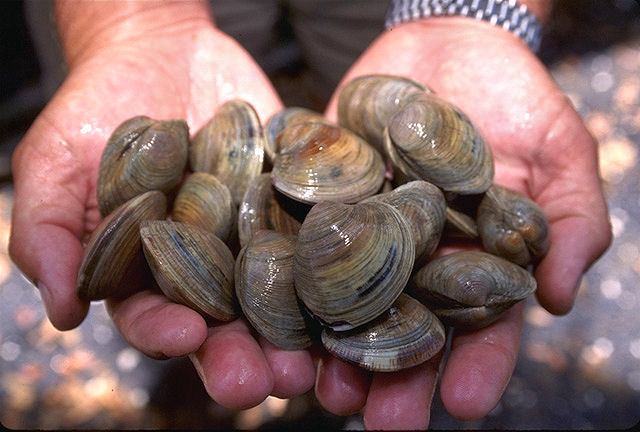
  - Collection of Mercenaria mercenaria, also known as hard clams or quahogs
    †Mercenaria mercenaria
  - †Mercenaria permagna
- Meretrix
  - †Meretrix securiformis – tentative report
- Mergus
  - †Mergus serrator – or unidentified related form
- †Merlangiogadus
  - †Merlangiogadus congatus
- Merluccius
  - †Merluccius albidus
  - †Merluccius bilinearis – or unidentified comparable form
- †Mesocena
  - †Mesocena elliptica – or unidentified comparable form
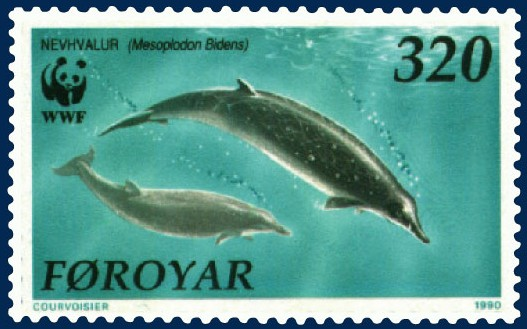
- Illustration on a stamp of a living Mesoplodon, or mesoplodont whale
  Mesoplodon
  - †Mesoplodon longirostris
- †Mesoteras – type locality for genus
  - †Mesoteras kerrianus – type locality for species
- Metulella
  - †Metulella styliola
- Microcytherura
  - †Microcytherura choctawhatcheensis
  - †Microcytherura d informal
  - †Microcytherura expanda
  - †Microcytherura h informal
  - †Microcytherura m informal
  - †Microcytherura minuta
  - †Microcytherura p informal
  - †Microcytherura r informal
  - †Microcytherura similis
- Microgadus
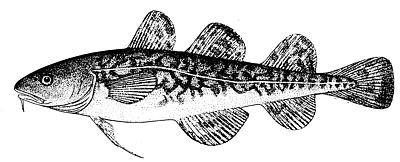
  - Illustration of a living Microgadus tomcod
    †Microgadus tomcod – or unidentified comparable form
- Micropogonias
- Miltha
  - †Miltha pandata
  - †Miltha pandatus – tentative report
- †Miocepphus
  - †Miocepphus mcclungi
  - †Miocepphus mergulellus – type locality for species
  - †Miocepphus undescribedspecies informal
- Mitra
  - †Mitra carolinensis
- Mitrella
  - †Mitrella gardnerae
  - †Mitrella waccamawensis
- Mobula
- Modiolus
  - †Modiolus ducatellii
  - †Modiolus modiolus
- Mola
  - †Mola chelonopsis
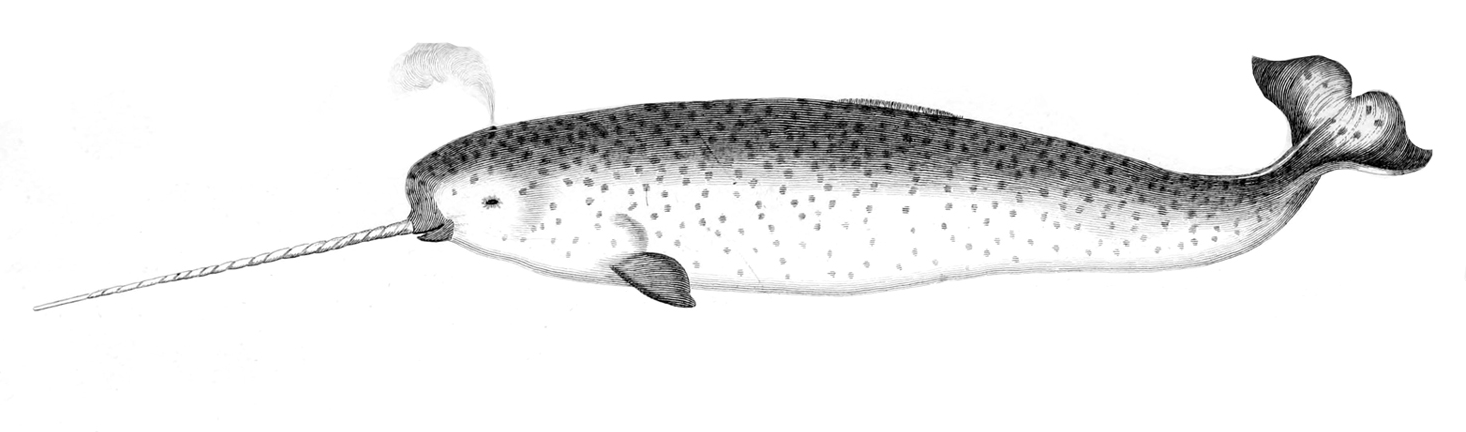
- A living Monodon monoceros, or narwhal
  Monodon – or unidentified comparable form
- Morum
  - †Morum harpula
- Morus
  - †Morus atlanticus
  - †Morus avitus
  - †Morus loxostylus
  - †Morus peninsularis
  - †Morus undescribedspeciesone informal
  - †Morus undescribedspeciestwo informal
- Muellerina
  - †Muellerina bassiounii
  - †Muellerina blowi
  - †Muellerina ohmerti
  - †Muellerina p informal
  - †Muellerina petersburgensis
  - †Muellerina wardi
- Mulinia
  - †Mulinia congesta
  - †Mulinia lateralis
- †Murrayina
  - †Murrayina barclayi
- Musculus
  - †Musculus lateralis
- Mustelus
- †Mya
  - †Mya arenaria
  - †Mya wilsoni
- Mycteroperca
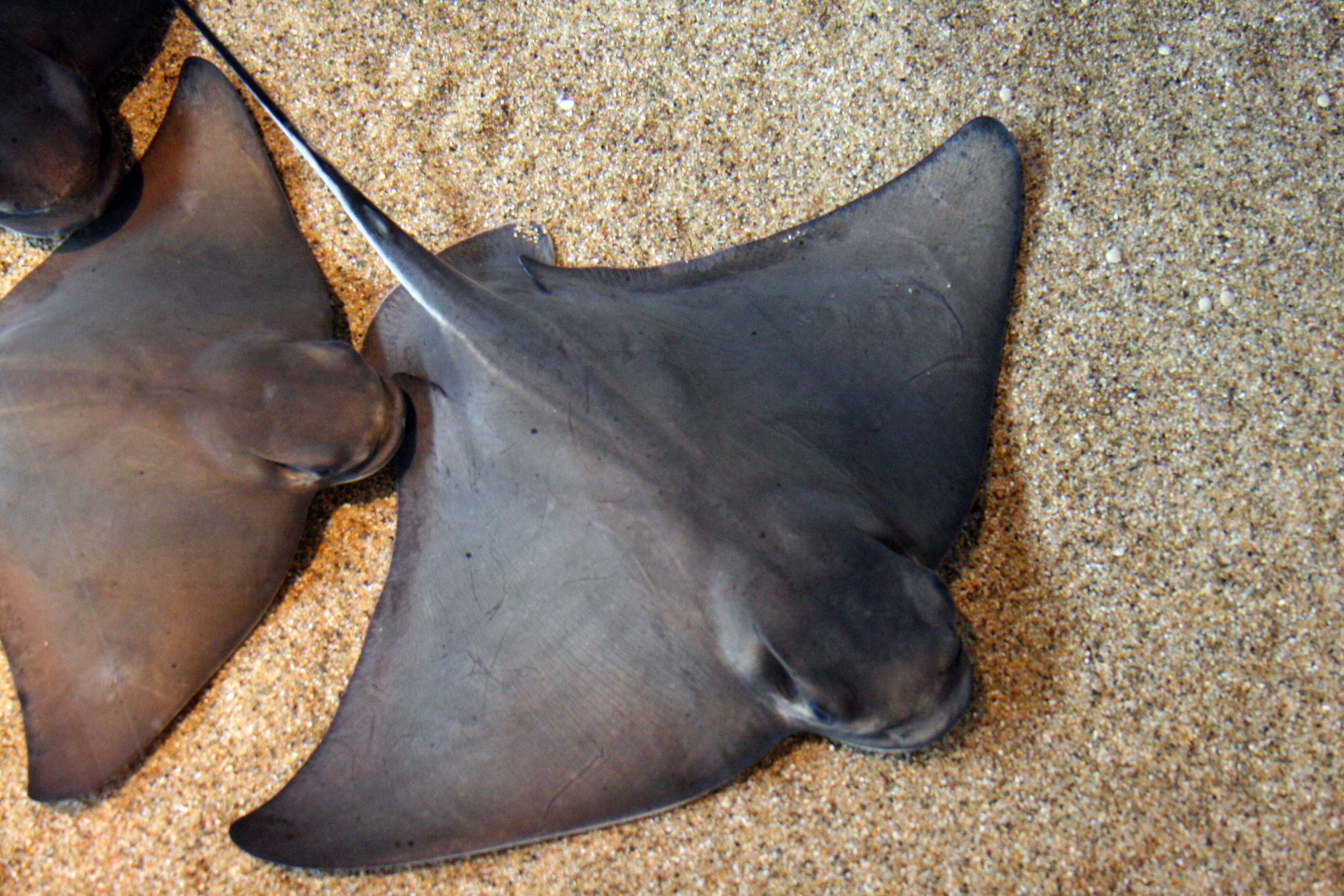
- Two living Myliobatis eagle rays
  Myliobatis
- Myochama
- Myriophyllum
  - †Myriophyllum heterophyllum
  - †Myriophyllum scabratum
- Mysella
  - †Mysella beaufortensis
  - †Mysella bladenensis
  - †Mysella majorina
  - †Mysella planulata
  - †Mysella stantoni
  - †Mysella velaini
- Mytilus
  - †Mytilus conradinus

== N ==
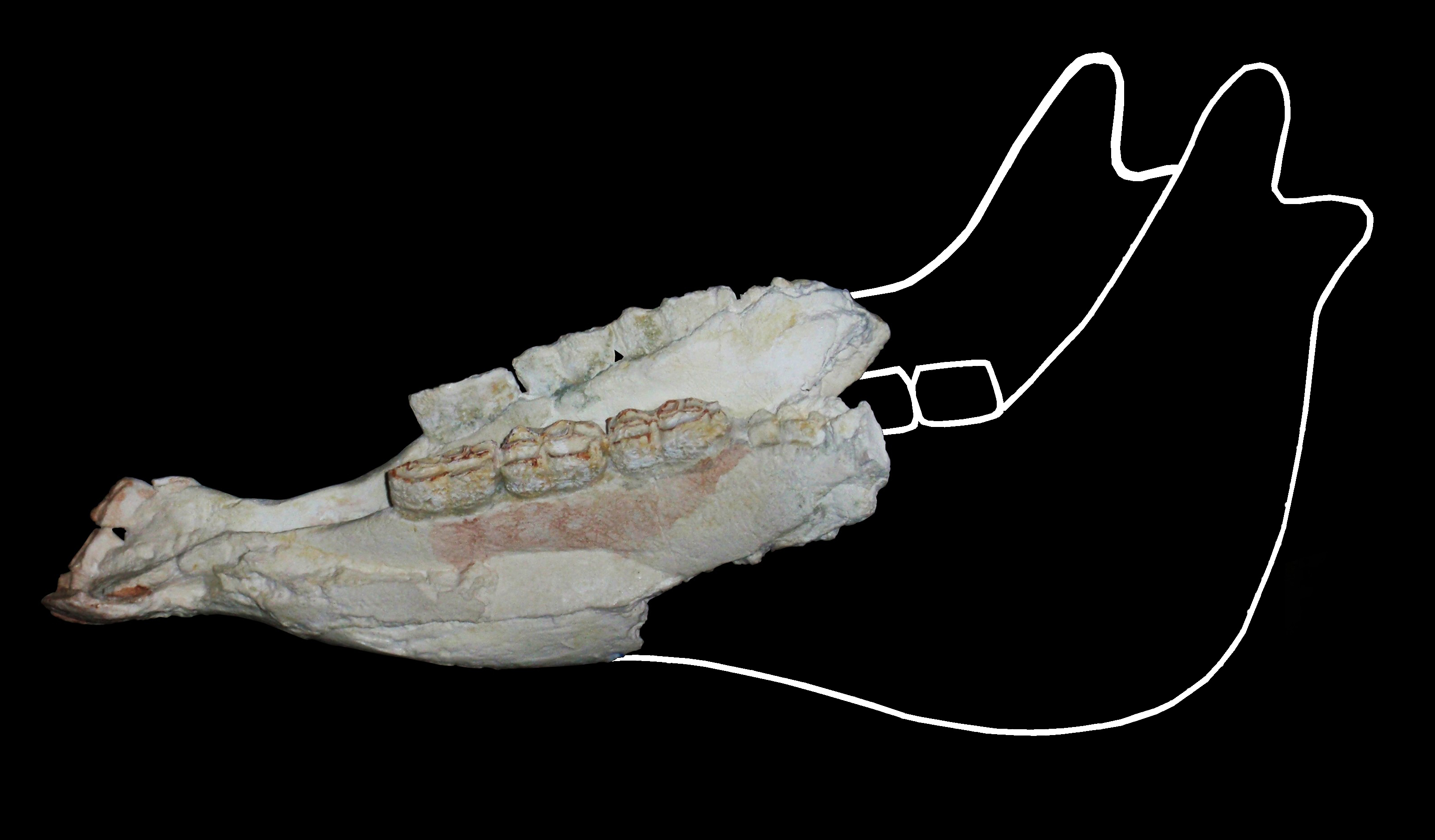
- Partial fossilized mandible of the Miocene-Pliocene horse Nannippus
  †Nannippus
  - †Nannippus lenticularis
- †Nannolithax
- †Nanogyra
  - †Nanogyra virgula
- †Nanosiren – tentative report
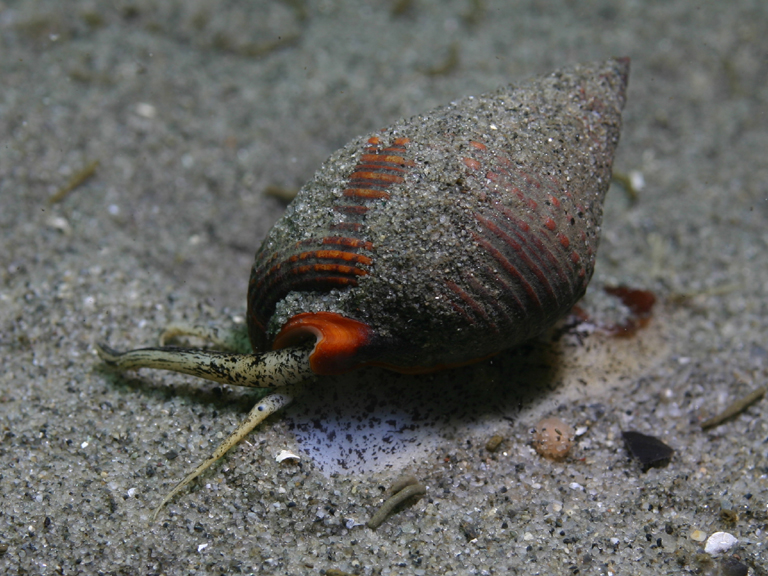
- A living Nassarius, or nassa mud snail
  Nassarius
  - †Nassarius acutus
  - †Nassarius antillarum
  - †Nassarius bidentata
  - †Nassarius caloosaensis
  - †Nassarius chowanensis
  - †Nassarius consensoides
  - †Nassarius cornelliana
  - †Nassarius lapenotierei
  - †Nassarius neogenensis
  - †Nassarius schizopyga – tentative report
  - †Nassarius smithiana
  - †Nassarius suffolkensis – or unidentified comparable form
  - †Nassarius vibex
  - †Nassarius zeta
- Naticarius
- †Navicula
  - †Navicula directa
  - †Navicula hennedyii
  - †Navicula pennata
- Negaprion
  - †Negaprion brevirostris
  - †Negaprion furimskyi – type locality for species
- Nemocardium
  - †Nemocardium diversum
- Neocaudites
  - †Neocaudites angulatus
  - †Neocaudites subimpressus
  - †Neocaudites variabilus
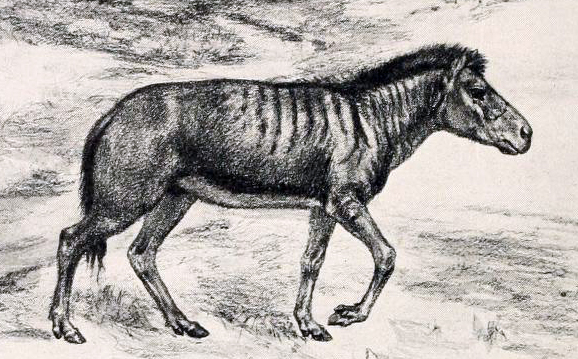
- Life restoration of a herd of Neohipparion. Robert Bruce Horsfall (1913).
  †Neohipparion
  - †Neohipparion eurystyle – or unidentified comparable form
- Neophrontops – tentative report
- Neverita
  - †Neverita duplicatus
- †Ninoziphius
  - †Ninoziphius platyrostris
- Niso
  - †Niso dalli
- †Nitzschia
  - †Nitzschia b informal
- Niveria
  - †Niveria suffusa
- Noetia
  - †Noetia carolinensis
  - †Noetia limula
- Nonion
  - †Nonion mauricensis
  - †Nonion pizarrense
- Nonionella
  - †Nonionella auris
- Notidanus
  - †Notidanus serratissimus
- Notorynchus
  - †Notorynchus cepidanus
- Nucleolites
  - †Nucleolites berryi – type locality for species
  - †Nucleolites carolinensis
  - †Nucleolites raveneli
- Nucula
  - †Nucula magnifica
  - †Nucula ovula
  - †Nucula proxima
  - †Nucula sphenopsis
  - †Nucula taphria
- Nuculana
  - †Nuculana acuta
  - †Nuculana magna
  - †Nuculana plana
- Numenius
  - †Numenius borealis – or unidentified related form
- †Nuphar
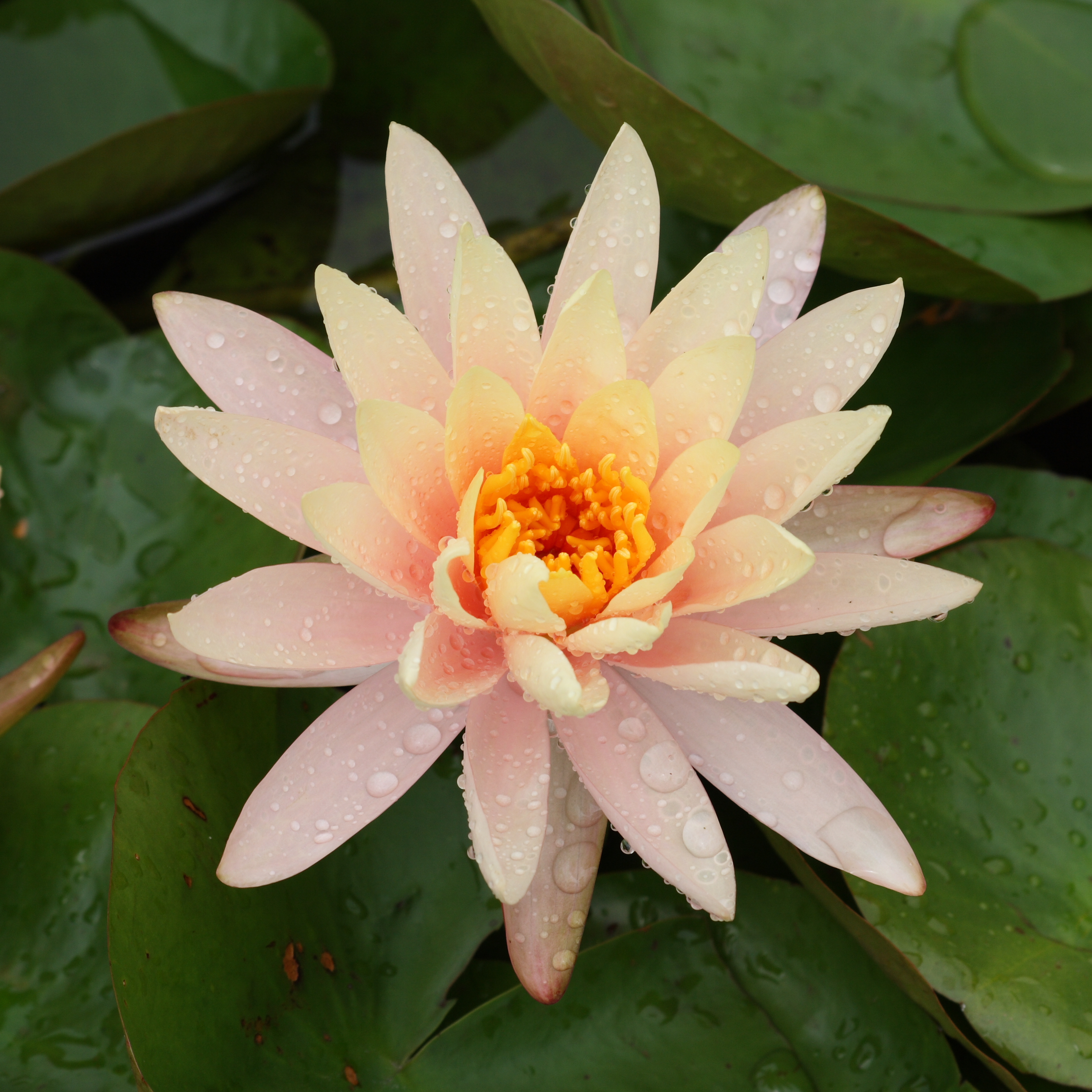
- Flower of a living Nymphaea
  Nymphaea
- †Nyssa

== O ==
- Odontaspis
  - †Odontaspis acutissima
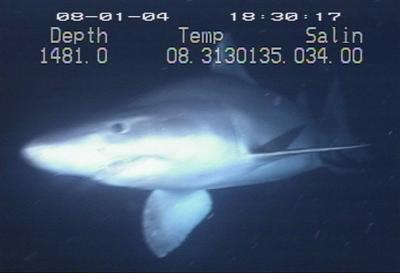
  - A living Odontaspis ferox, or smalltooth sand tiger
    †Odontaspis ferox
  - †Odontaspis koerti – tentative report
- †Odontogryphaea
  - †Odontogryphaea thirsae
- Odostomia
  - †Odostomia acutidens
  - †Odostomia simplex
- Oliva
  - †Oliva carolinensis
  - †Oliva posti
  - †Oliva robesonensis
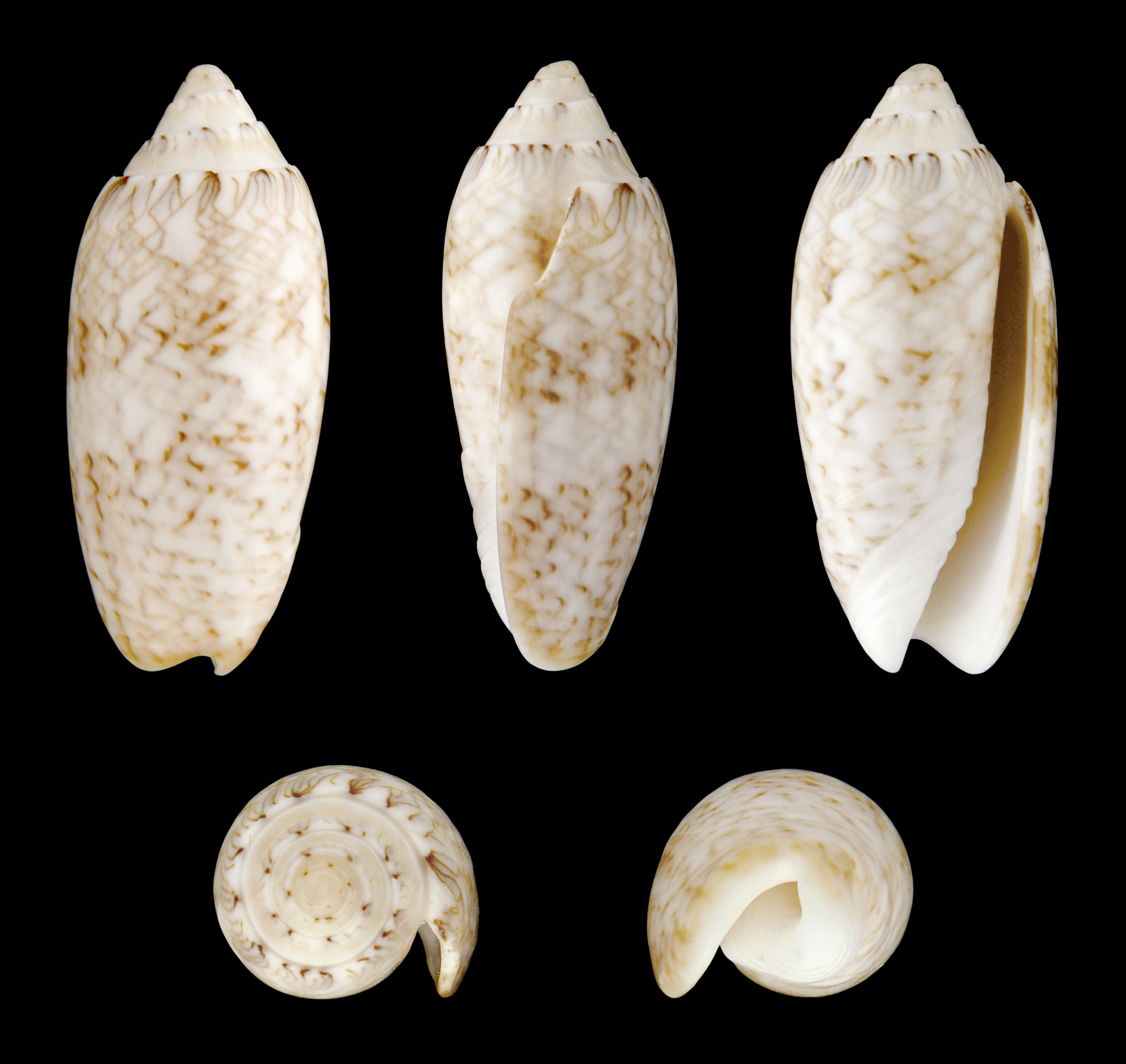
  - Shell in multiple views of an Oliva sayana, or lettered olive sea snail
    †Oliva sayana
- Olivella
  - †Olivella carolinae
  - †Olivella minuta
  - †Olivella mutica
- Onoba
  - †Onoba geraea
- †Ontocetus – type locality for genus
  - †Ontocetus emmonsi – type locality for species
- Oocorys
  - †Oocorys vadosus – type locality for species
- Ophidion
  - †Ophidion grayi
- †Ophiraphidites
  - †Ophiraphidites hadros – type locality for species
- †Opimocythere
  - †Opimocythere martini
- †Opsanus
  - †Opsanus tau
- Orbulina
  - †Orbulina suturalis
  - †Orbulina uiversa
- Orionina
  - †Orionina vaughani
- Ortalis – tentative report
- †Orthosurcula
  - †Orthosurcula aequa – type locality for species
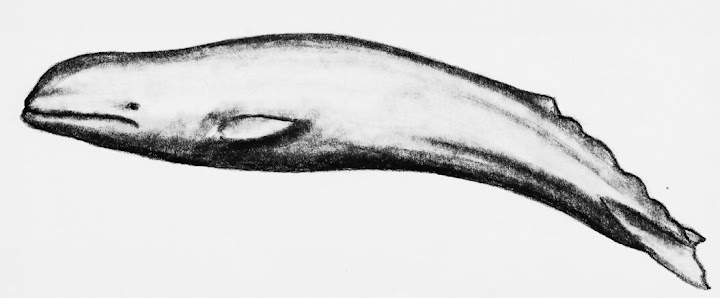
- Life restoration of the Miocene sperm whale Orycterocetus
  †Orycterocetus
  - †Orycterocetus cornutidens – type locality for species
  - †Orycterocetus quadratidens
- †Osmunda
  - †Osmunda regalis
- Ostrea
  - †Ostrea compressirostra
  - †Ostrea compressirostris
  - †Ostrea disparilis
  - †Ostrea falco
  - †Ostrea mauricensis
- Ostrya
- †Otodus
  - †Otodus angustidens
  - Diagram illustrating the largest (grey) and most conservative (red) size estimates of the Miocene-Pliocene shark Carcharocles megalodon (sometimes Carcharodon or Otodus megalodon) with a whale shark (violet), great white shark (green), and anachronistic human (black) to scale
    †Otodus megalodon

== P ==
- Pachyptila
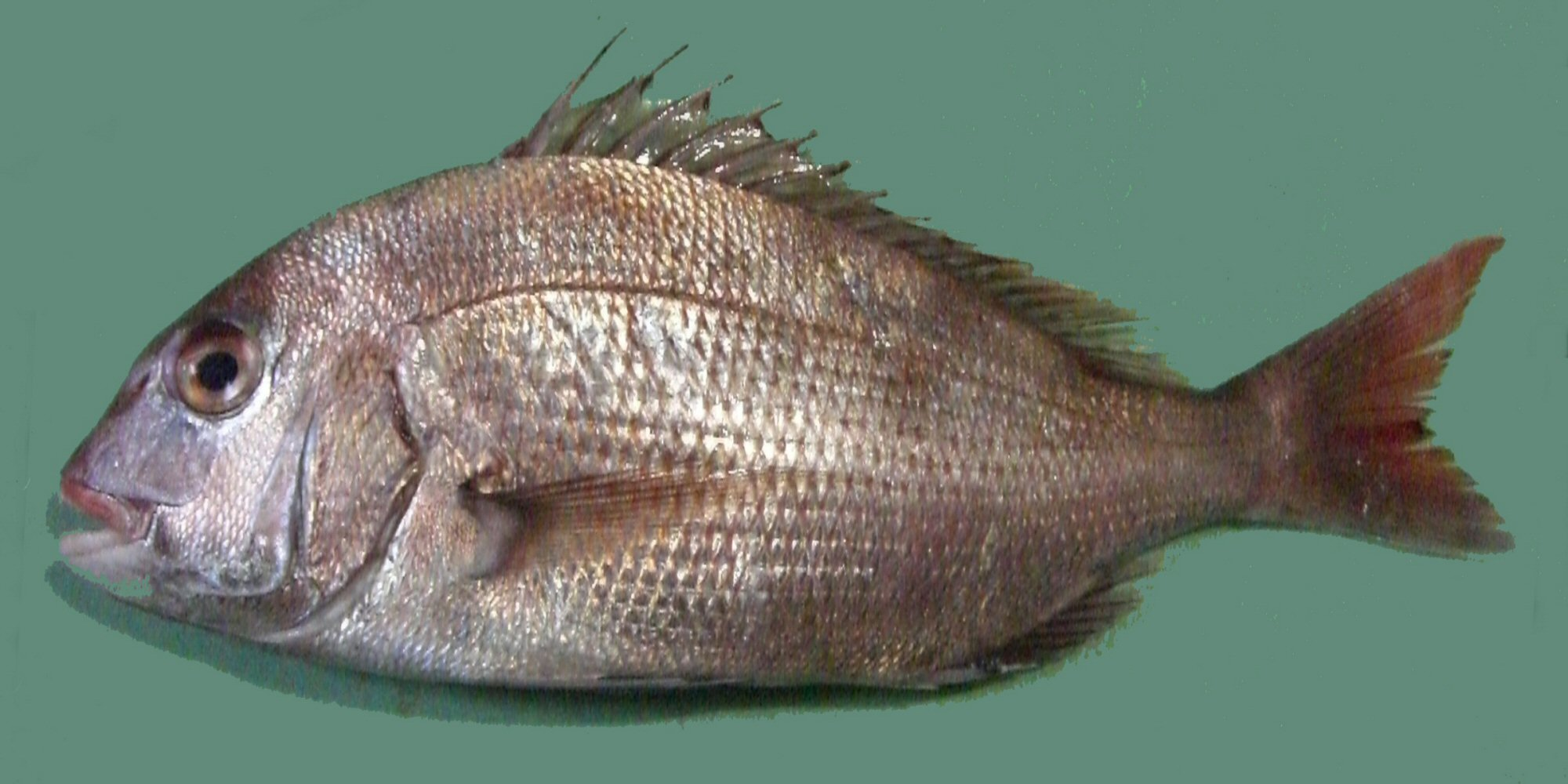
- A living Pagrus sea bream
  Pagrus
  - †Pagrus hyneus
- †Palaciosa
  - †Palaciosa minuta
- †Paleophoca
  - †Paleophoca nystii
- Pandion
- Pandora
  - †Pandora arenosa
  - †Pandora naviculoides
  - †Pandora trilineata
  - †Pandora tuomeyi
- Panopea
  - †Panopea goldfussii
  - †Panopea reflexa
- Paraconcavus
  - †Paraconcavus prebrevicalcar
- Paracyprideis
  - †Paracyprideis c informal
- Paracypris
  - †Paracypris b informal
- Paracytheridea
  - †Paracytheridea altida
  - †Paracytheridea cronini
  - †Paracytheridea f informal
  - †Paracytheridea mucra
  - †Paracytheridea rugosa
  - †Paracytheridea toleri
- †Paracytheroma
  - †Paracytheroma stephensoni
- Paradoxostoma
  - †Paradoxostoma delicata
  - †Paradoxostoma e informal
- Paragaleus
- †Paralia
  - †Paralia complexa
  - †Paralia sulcata
- Paralichthys
- †Paramya
  - †Paramya subovata
- Paranesidea – tentative report
  - †Paranesidea laevicula
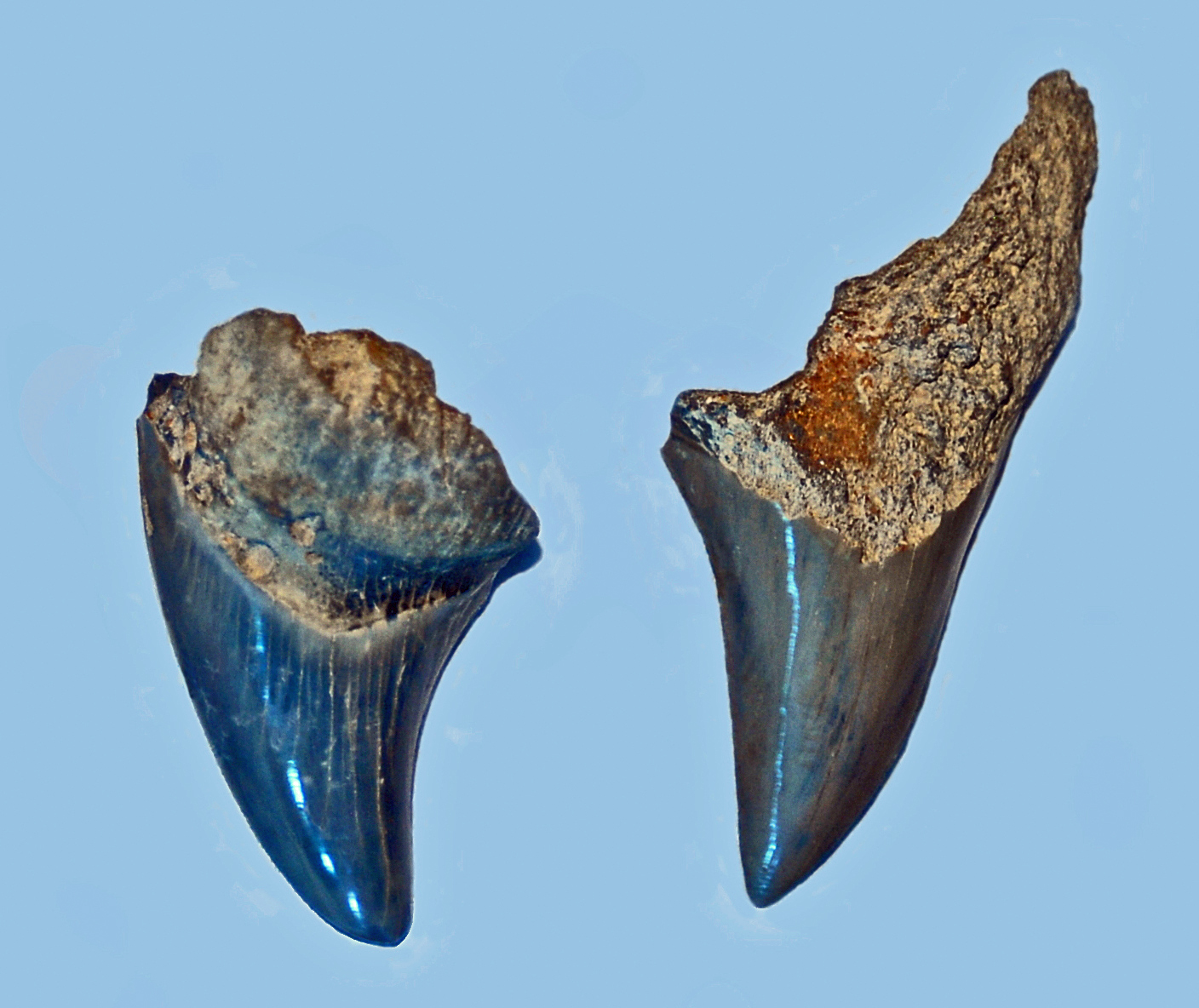
- Fossilized teeth of the Eocene-Pleistocene shark Parotodus, or the false-toothed mako
  †Parotodus
  - †Parotodus benedenii
- Parvanachis
  - †Parvanachis obesa
- Parvilucina
  - †Parvilucina costata
  - †Parvilucina crenella
  - †Parvilucina crenulata
  - †Parvilucina multilineatus
  - †Parvilucina multistriata
- †Pecchiola
  - †Pecchiola dalliana
- †Pecchiolia
  - †Pecchiolia dalliana
- Pecten
  - †Pecten biddeleana – or unidentified comparable form
  - †Pecten chickaria
  - †Pecten elixatus
  - †Pecten humphreysii
  - †Pecten mclellani – type locality for species
  - †Pecten membranosus
  - †Pecten perplanus
- †Pediastrum
  - †Pediastrum boryanum
- †Pediomeryx
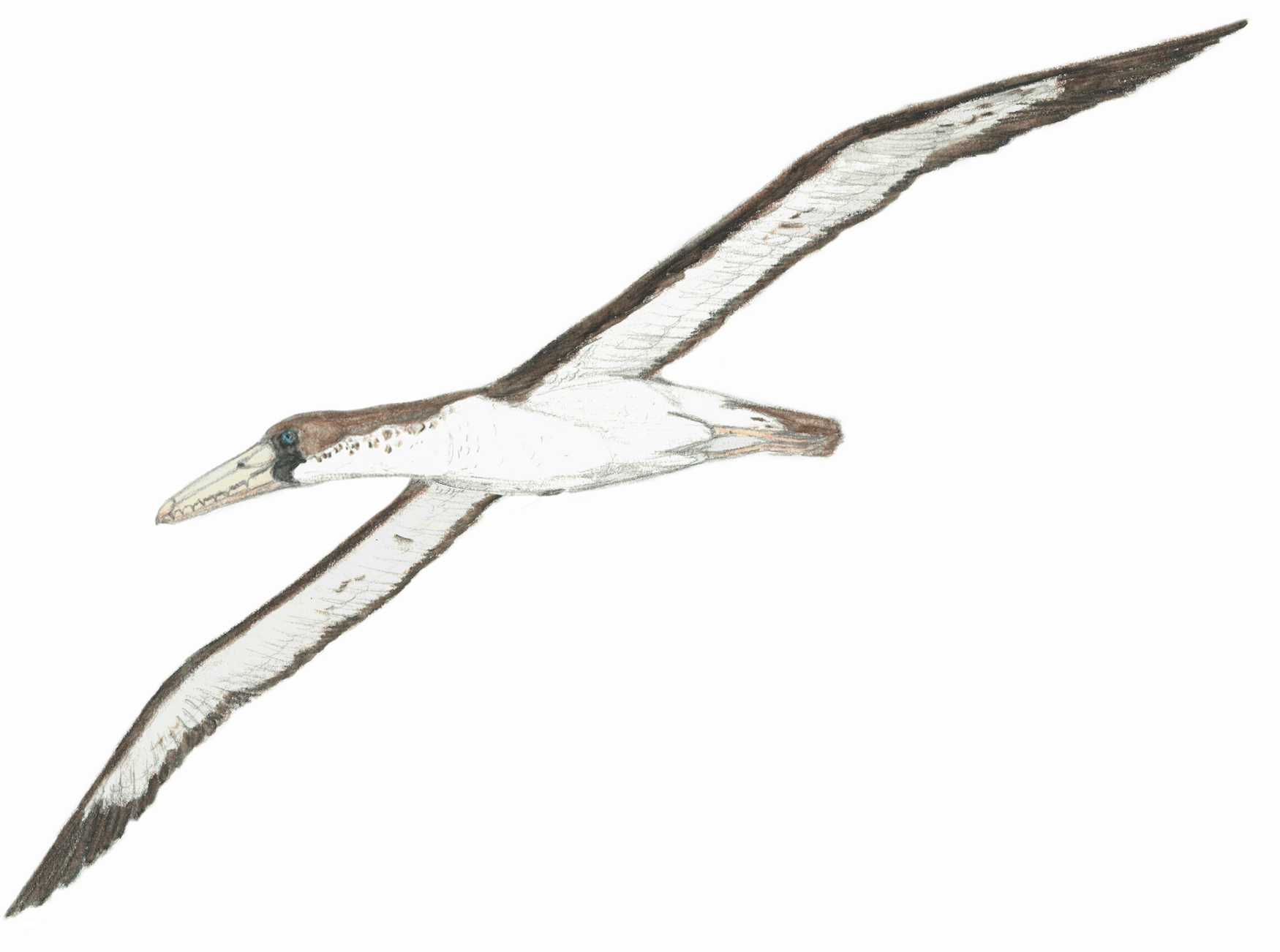
- Life restoration of the Oligocene-Pleistocene false-toothed bird Pelagornis
  †Pelagornis
  - †Pelagornis speciesone informal
  - †Pelagornis speciestwo informal
- Pelecanus
  - †Pelecanus schreiberi – type locality for species
- Peratocytheridea
  - †Peratocytheridea bradyi
  - †Peratocytheridea j informal
  - †Peratocytheridea sandbergi
  - †Peratocytheridea setipunctata
- †Periarchus
  - †Periarchus lyelli
- †Periptera
  - †Periptera tetracladia
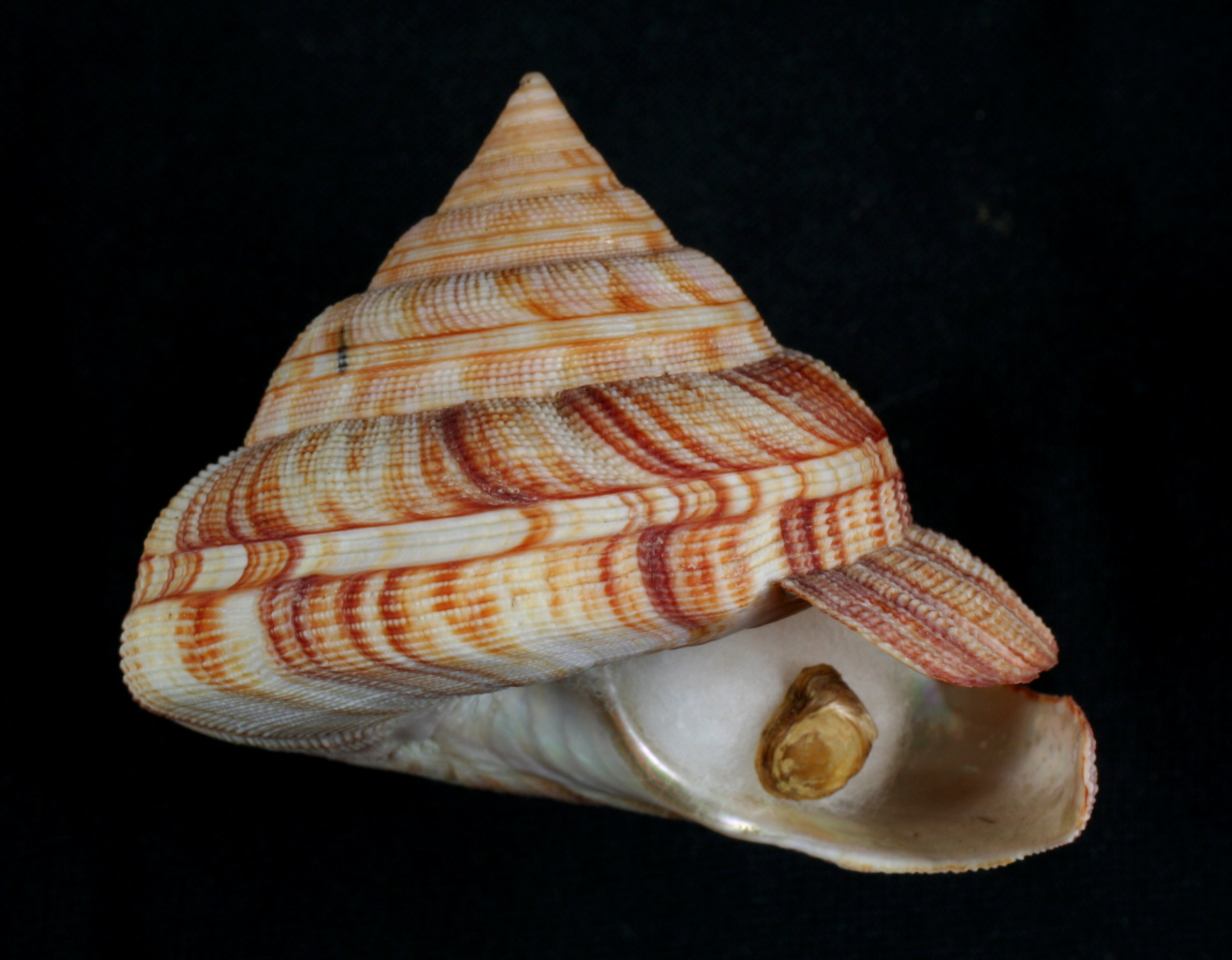
- Shell of a Perotrochus slit sea snail
  Perotrochus
  - †Perotrochus hanoverensis – type locality for species
- Petaloconchus
  - †Petaloconchus graniferus
  - †Petaloconchus virginica
- Petricola
  - †Petricola carolinensis
  - †Petricola grinnelli
  - †Petricola pectorosa
  - †Petricola pholadiformis
- Phalacrocorax
  - †Phalacrocorax largespecies informal
  - †Phalacrocorax wetmorei
- Phalium
  - †Phalium newbernensis – type locality for species
- †Phocageneus – or unidentified related form
  - †Phocageneus venustus
- †Phocanella
  - †Phocanella pumila
- †Phoebastria
  - †Phoebastria albatrus – or unidentified related form
  - †Phoebastria anglica
  - †Phoebastria immutabilis – or unidentified related form
  - †Phoebastria nigripes – or unidentified related form
  - †Phoebastria rexularum
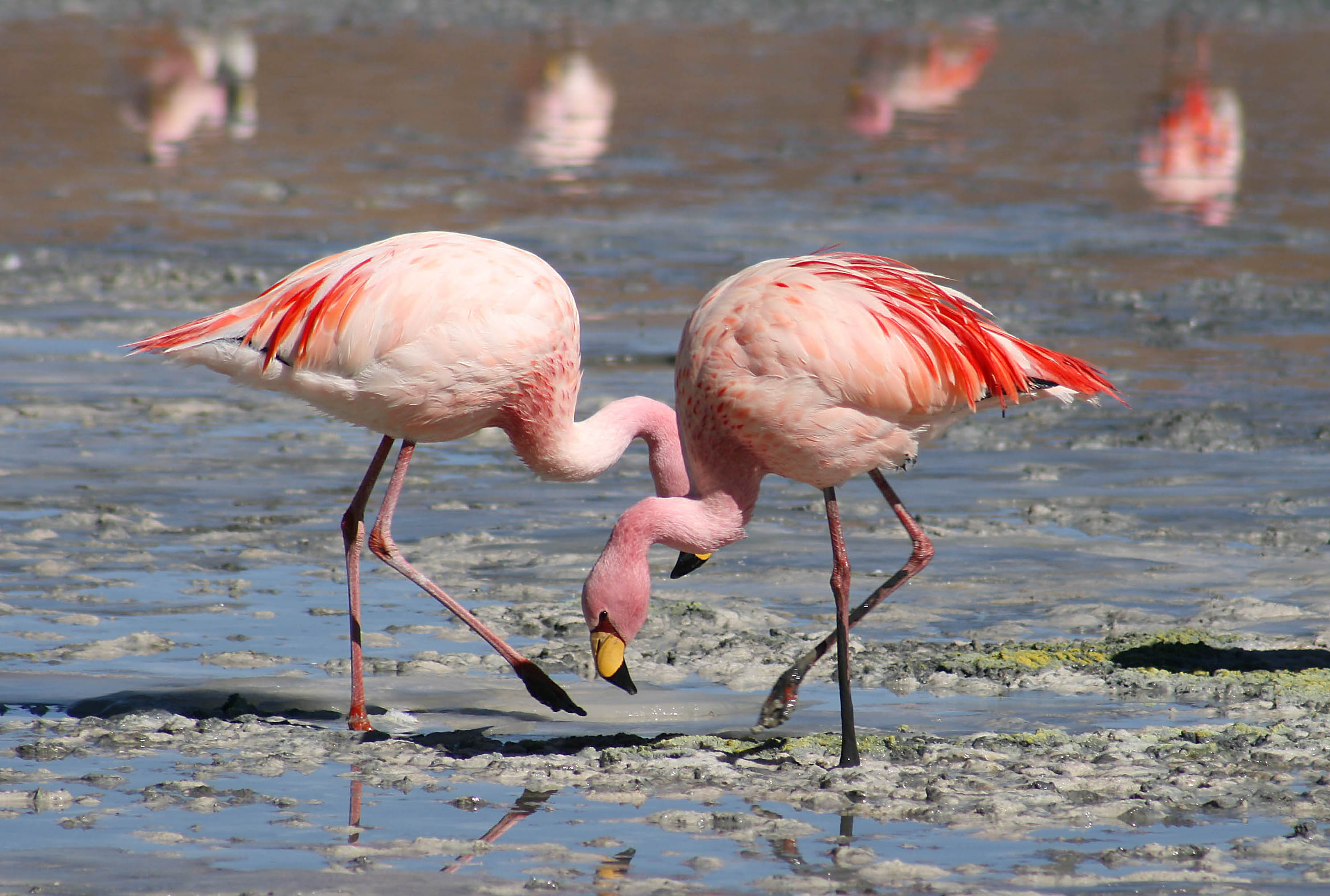
- Two Phoenicopterus, or flamingos
  Phoenicopterus
  - †Phoenicopterus floridanus – or unidentified comparable form
- Pholadomya
  - †Pholadomya claibornensis
- Phyllacanthus
  - †Phyllacanthus carolinensis
  - †Phyllacanthus mitchellii
- Phyllonotus
  - †Phyllonotus davisi
  - †Phyllonotus pomum
- Physeter – or unidentified comparable form
  - †Physeter macrocephalus
- †Physeterula – or unidentified comparable form
  - †Physeterula dubusi
- Picea
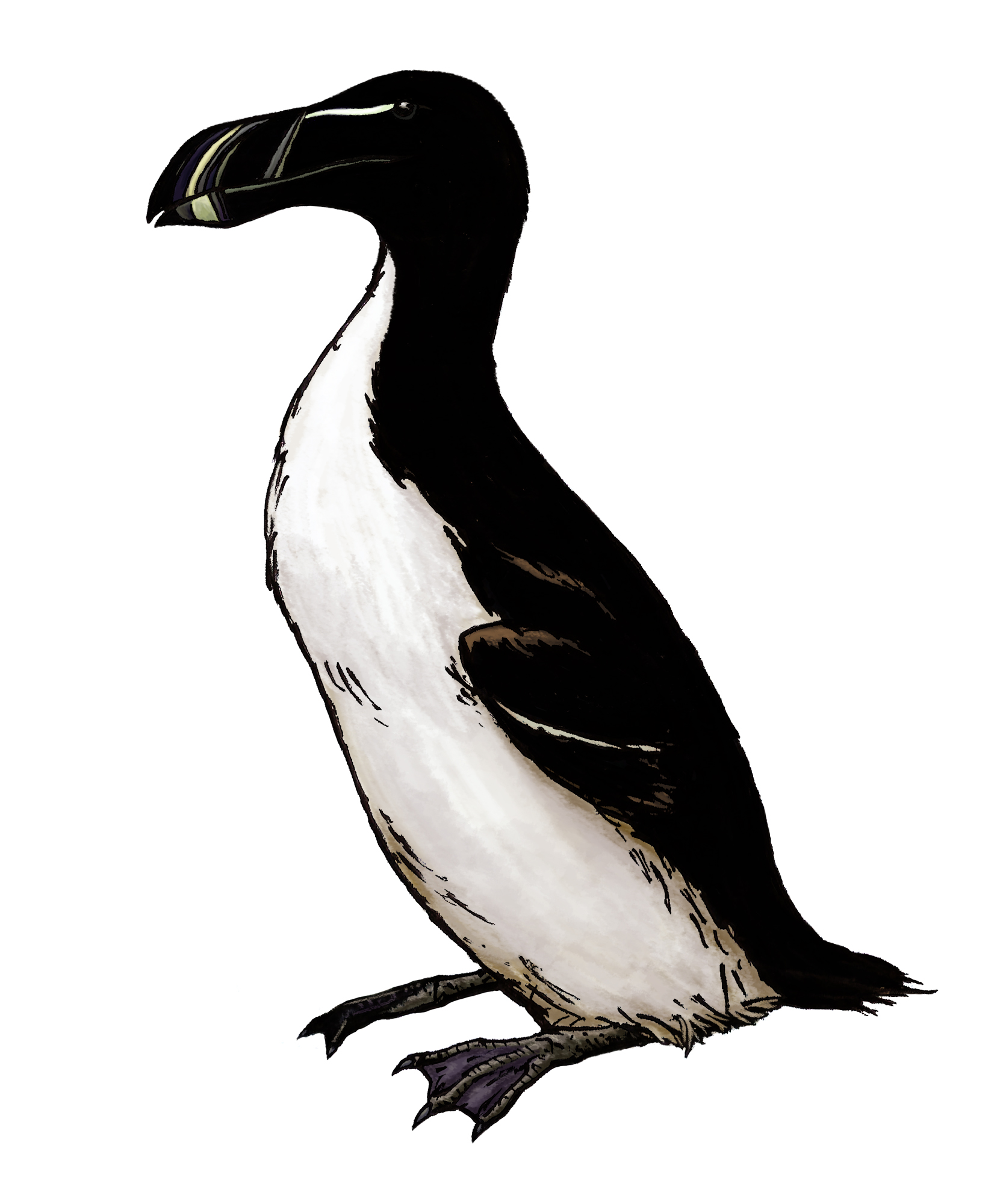
- Restoration of Pinguinus alfrednewtoni
  †Pinguinus
  - †Pinguinus alfrednewtoni – type locality for species
- Pinna – tentative report
  - †Pinna harnetti
- Pinus
  - †Pinus palustris – or unidentified comparable form
- Pisania
  - †Pisania nux
- Pitar
  - †Pitar castoriana
  - †Pitar chioneformis
  - †Pitar morrhuanus
  - †Pitar ovatus
- Placopecten
  - †Placopecten clintonius
  - †Placopecten magellanicus – or unidentified related form
  - †Placopecten princepoides
- †Plagiarca
  - †Plagiarca rhomboidella
- Plagiobrissus
- †Platyphoca
  - †Platyphoca vulgaris
- †Plectroninia
  - †Plectroninia pertusa – type locality for species
- †Plejona
  - †Plejona conoides – tentative report
  - †Plejona petrosa
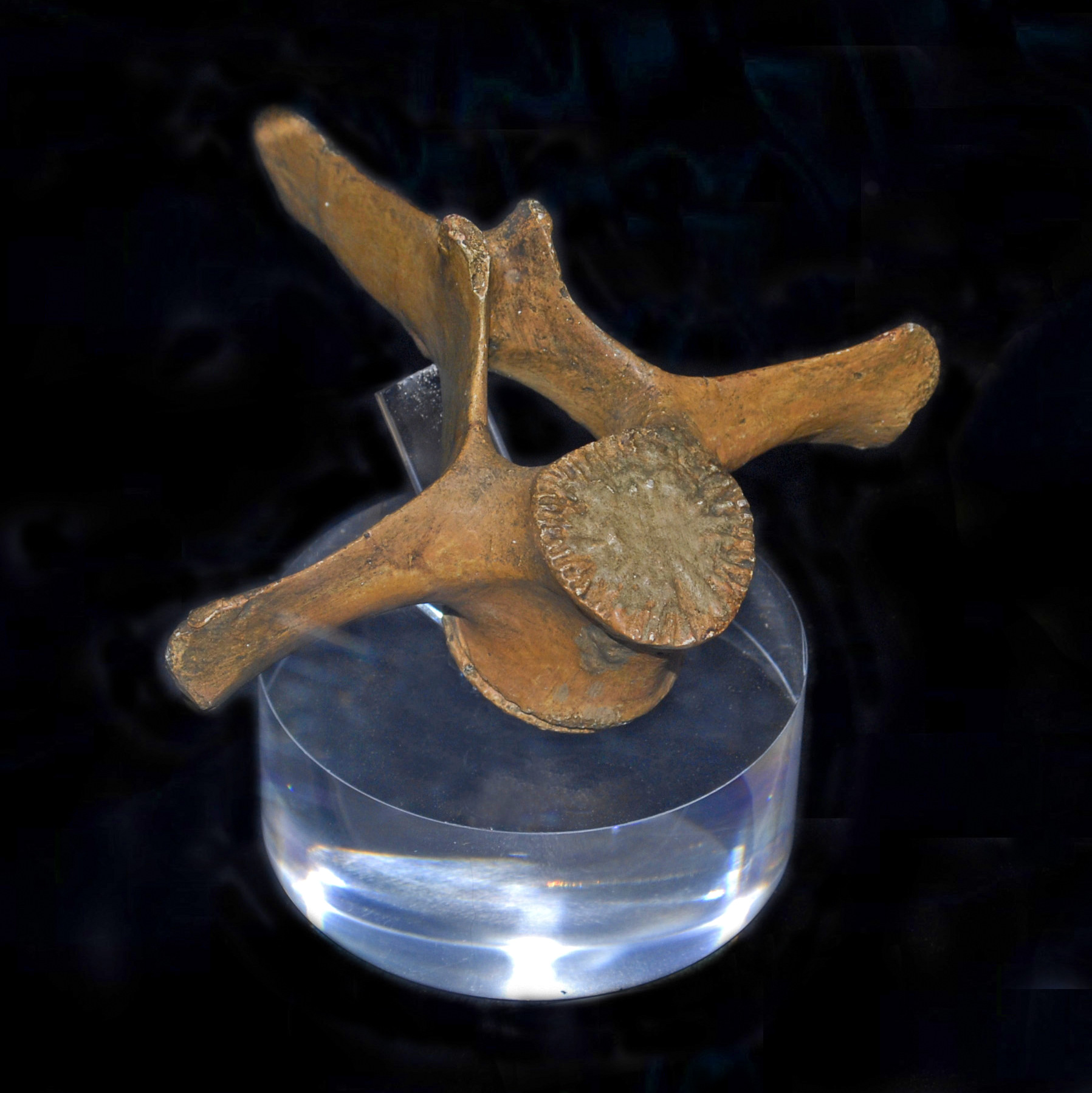
- Fossilized vertebra of the Miocene-Pleistocene baleen whale Plesiocetus
  †Plesiocetus – or unidentified comparable form
- Pleurofusia
  - †Pleurofusia menthafons
- Pleuromeris
  - †Pleuromeris auroraensis
  - †Pleuromeris decemcostata
  - †Pleuromeris quadrata
  - †Pleuromeris tridentata
- †Pleurosigma
  - †Pleurosigma affine
- Pleurotomaria
  - †Pleurotomaria nixa
- †Plicatoria
  - †Plicatoria ventricosa
  - †Plicatoria wilmingtonensis
- Plicatula
  - †Plicatula densata
  - †Plicatula filamentosa
  - †Plicatula gibbosa
- †Plinthicus
  - †Plinthicus stenodon
- †Pliopontos
  - †Pliopontos littoralis
- Pluvialis
  - †Pluvialis squatarola – or unidentified related form
- Podiceps
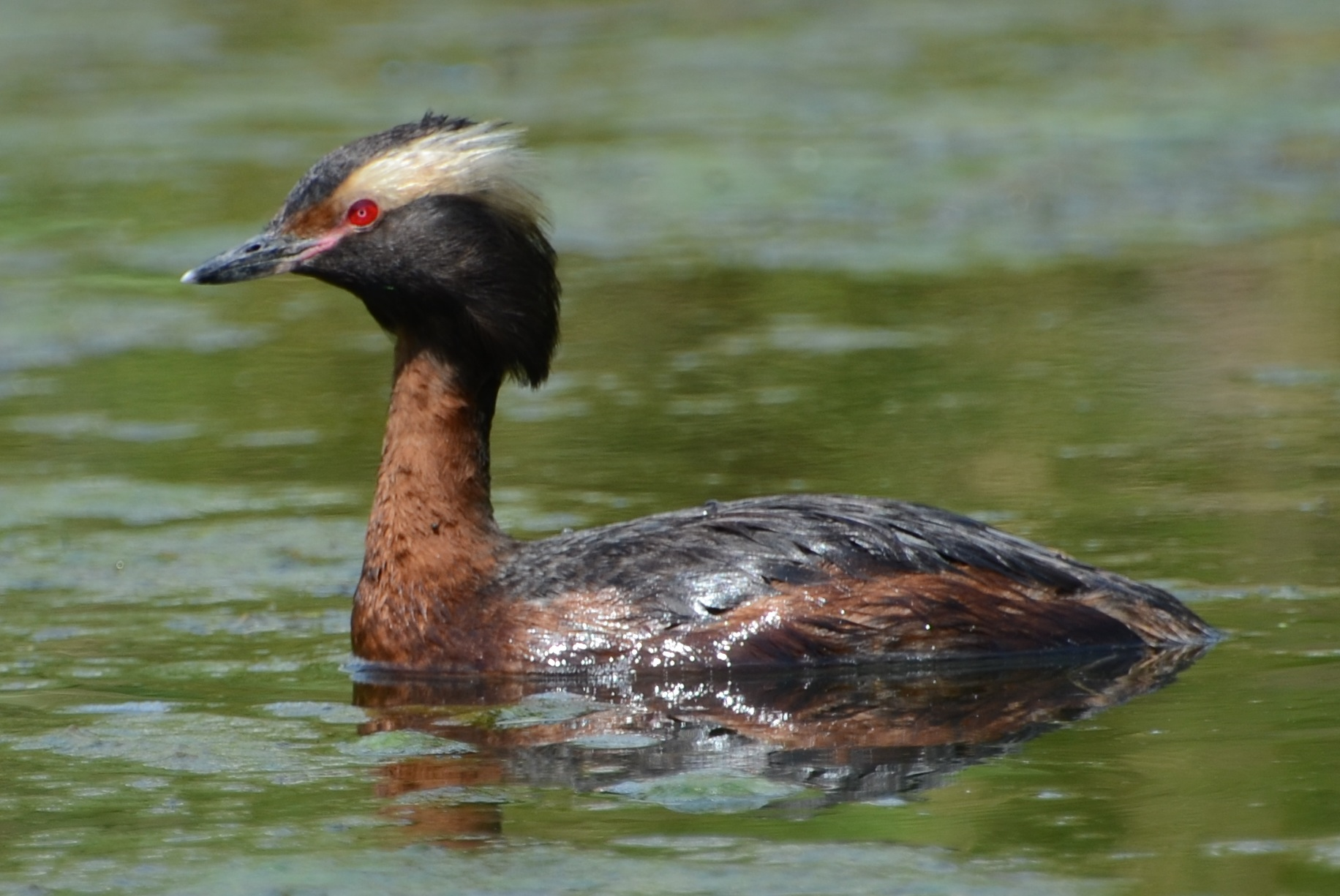
  - A living Podiceps auritus, or horned grebe
    †Podiceps auritus
- Pododesmus
  - †Pododesmus waccamawensis
- Pogonias
  - †Pogonias cromis – or unidentified comparable form
- Polinices
- Polydora
- Polygireulima
  - †Polygireulima spatulata
- Polygonum
- Polymesoda
  - †Polymesoda caroliniana
- Pomatomus
  - †Pomatomus salatrix
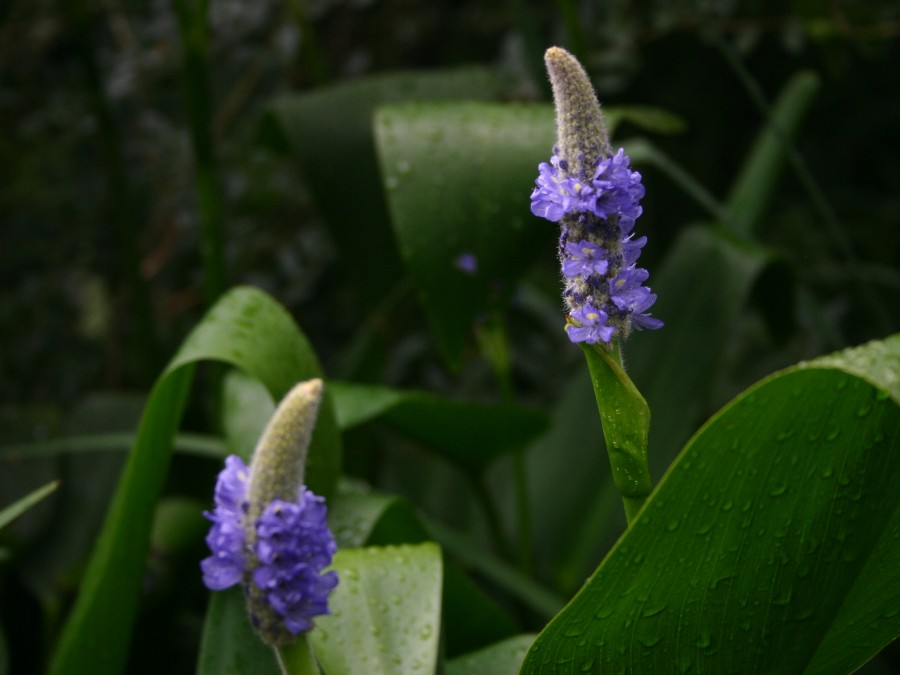
- Living Pontederia pickerel weeds
  †Pontederia
- Pontocythere – report made of unidentified related form or using admittedly obsolete nomenclature
  - †Pontocythere d informal
  - †Pontocythere g informal
  - †Pontocythere i informal
  - †Pontocythere j informal
- Pontoporia – or unidentified comparable form
- Populus
- †Potamogeton
- Prionotus
  - †Prionotus evolans – or unidentified comparable form
- Pristiophorus
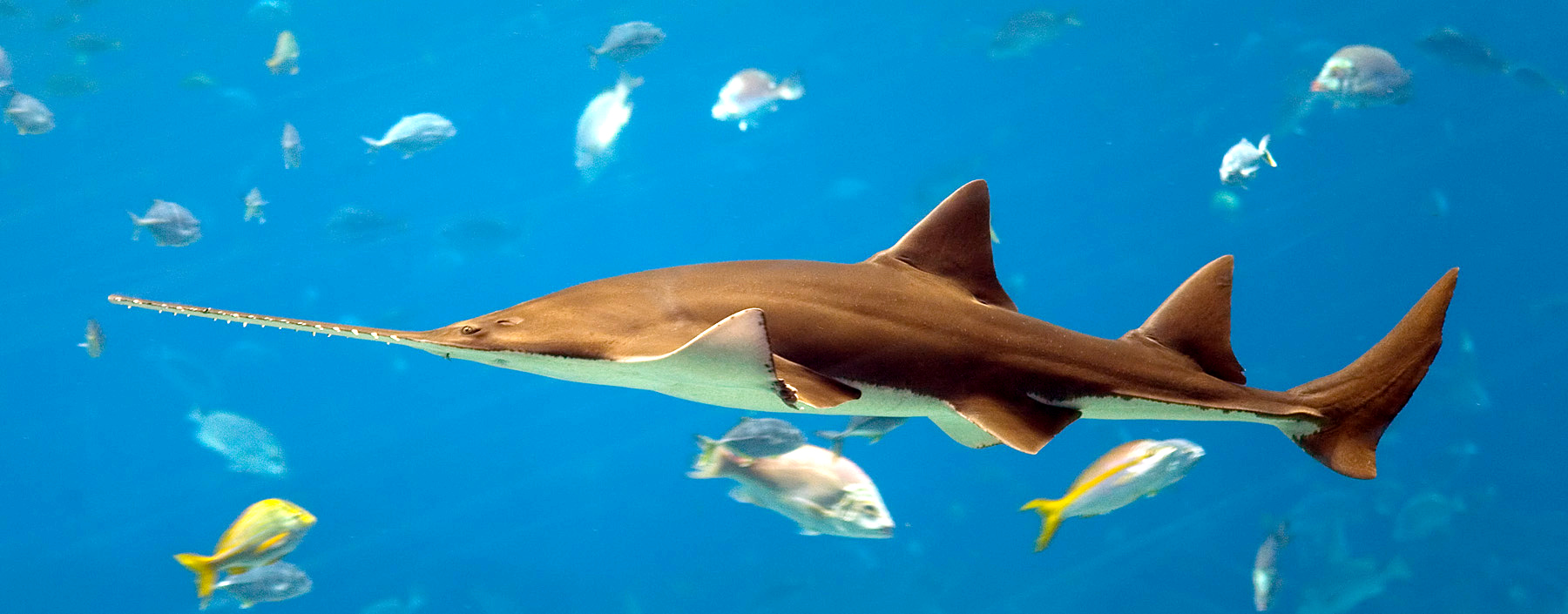
- A living Pristis sawfish
  Pristis
  - †Pristis curvidens
  - †Pristis pectinatus – or unidentified comparable form
- †Probolarina
  - †Probolarina breviostris – type locality for species
  - †Probolarina holmesi
  - †Probolarina holmesii
  - †Probolarina salpinx
- Procellaria
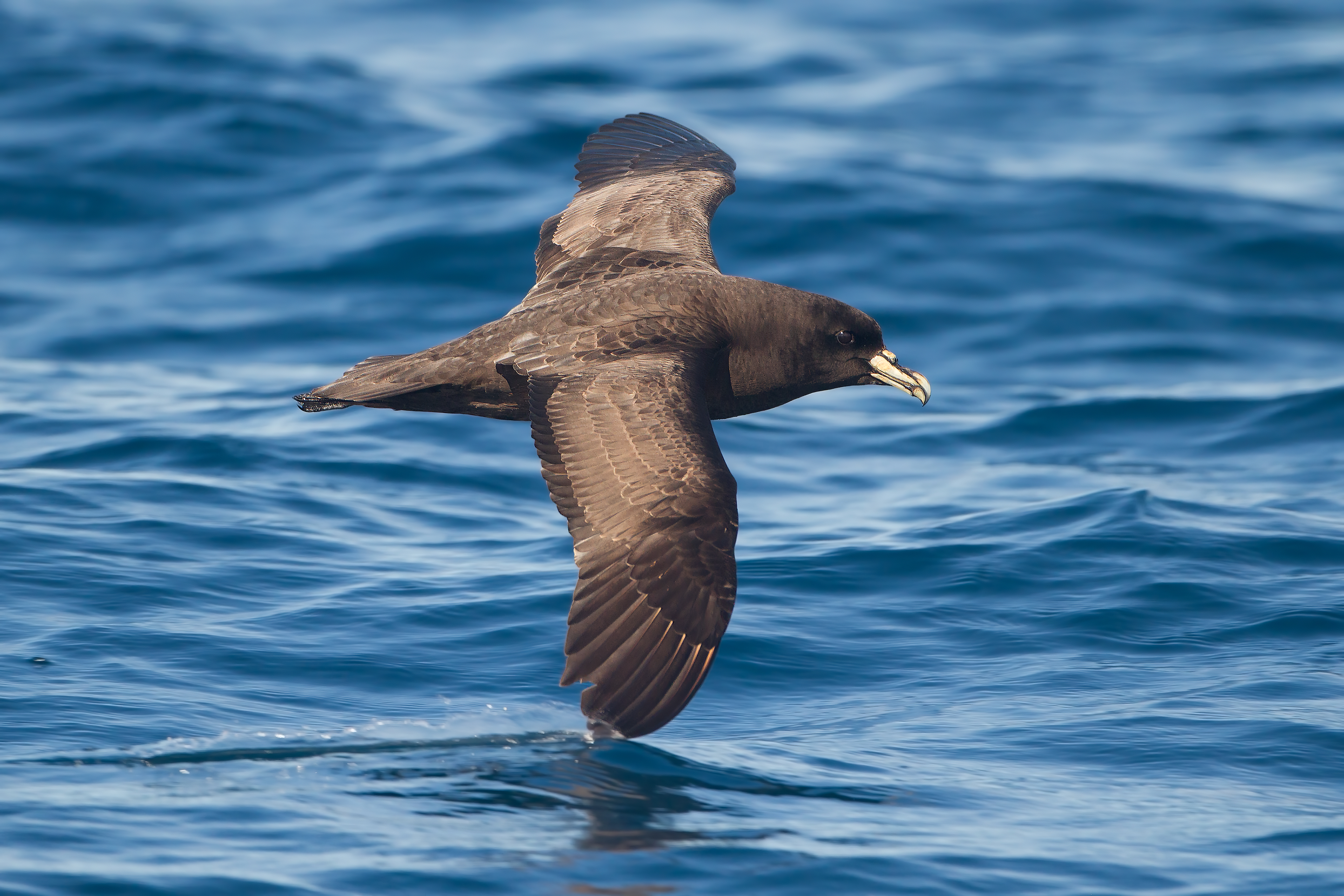
  - A living Procellaria aequinoctialis, or white-chinned petrel
    †Procellaria aequinoctialis – or unidentified comparable form
  - †Procellaria parkinsoni – or unidentified comparable form
- †Procolpochelys
- Propontocypris
  - †Propontocypris d
- Proteoconcha
  - †Proteoconcha gigantica
  - †Proteoconcha jamesensis
  - †Proteoconcha mimica
  - †Proteoconcha multipunctata
  - †Proteoconcha tuberculata
  - †Proteoconcha z informal
- †Protoscutella
  - †Protoscutella conradi
  - †Protoscutella plana
  - †Protoscutella rosehillensis
- †Protosiren
- Prunum
  - †Prunum bellum
  - †Prunum limatulum
  - †Prunum roscidum
- Psammacoma
- Psammechinus
  - †Psammechinus philanthropus
- †Psephophorus
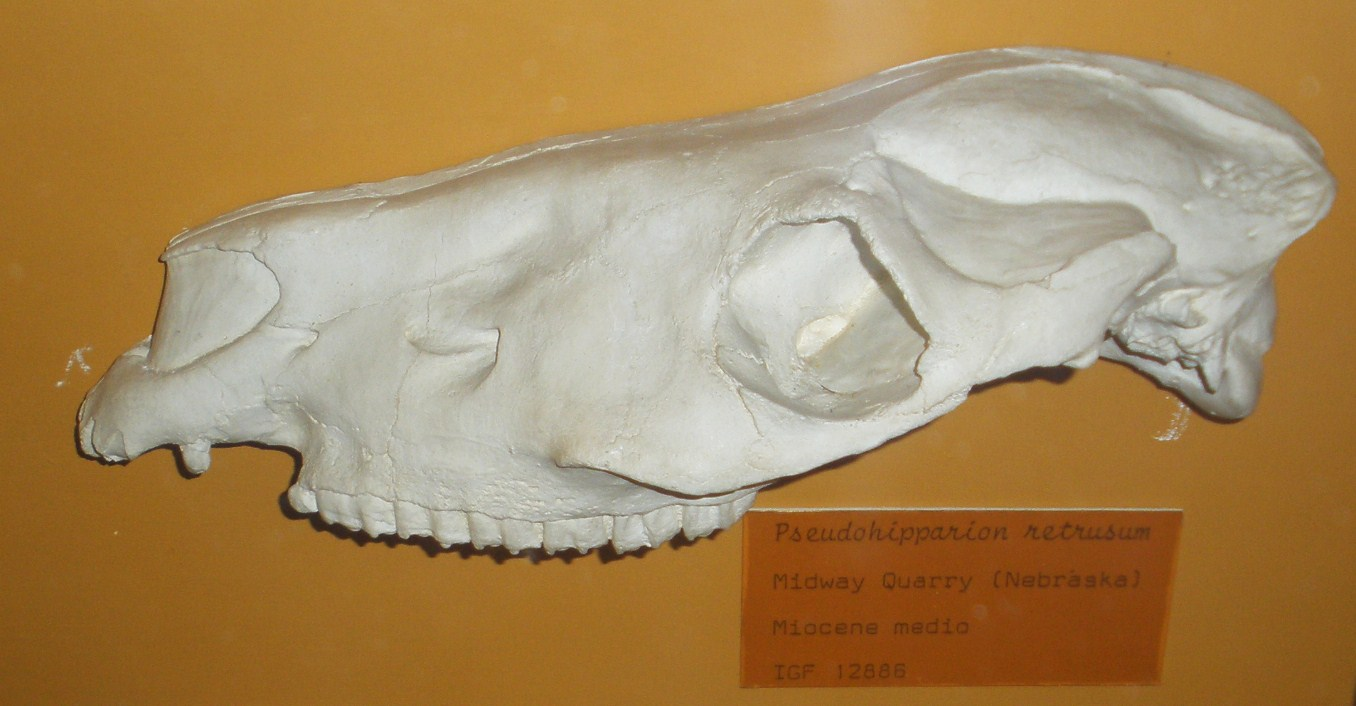
- Replica of a fossilized cranium of the Miocene horse Pseudhipparion
  †Pseudhipparion
  - †Pseudhipparion simpsoni
- Pseudochama
  - †Pseudochama corticosa
- Pseudocytheretta
  - †Pseudocytheretta burnsi
- †Pseudodimerogramma
  - †Pseudodimerogramma eliptica
- Pseudomiltha
  - †Pseudomiltha nocariensis – type locality for species
- †Pseudopyxilla
  - †Pseudopyxilla americana
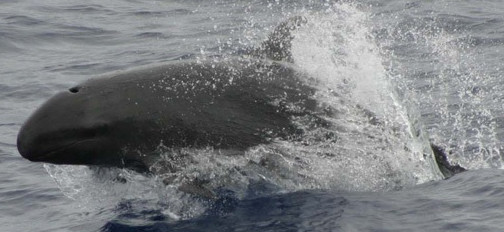
- A living Pseudorca crassidens, or false killer whale
  Pseudorca
- Pseudotorinia
  - †Pseudotorinia nupera
- Pteria
- Pterodroma
  - †Pterodroma lessonii
- †Pterodromoides
  - †Pterodromoides minoricensis
- Pteromeris
  - †Pteromeris abbreviata
  - †Pteromeris perplana
- Pteromylaeus
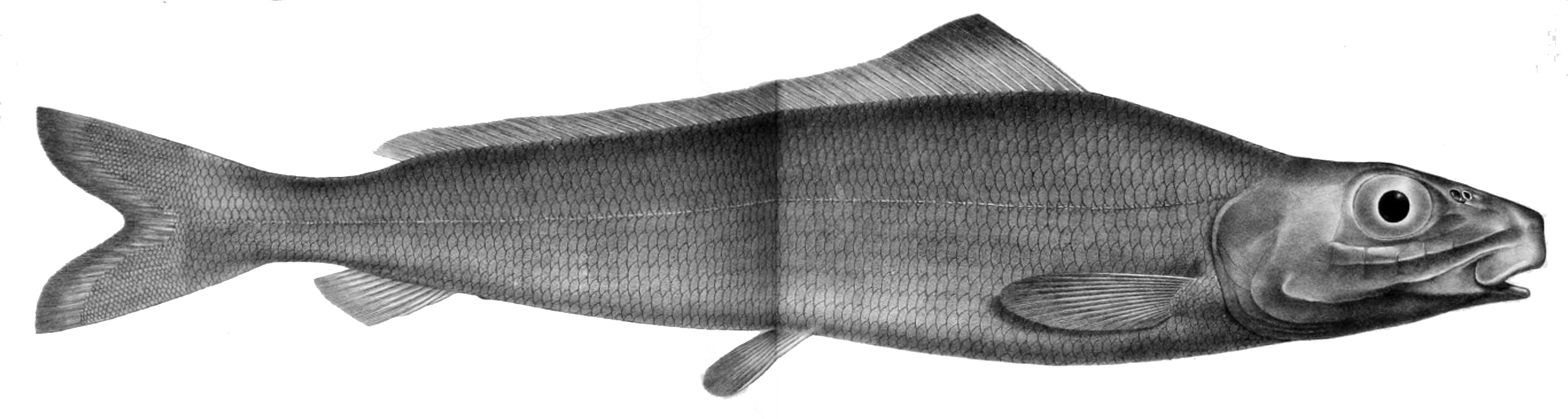
- Illustration of a living Pterothrissus gissu, or Japanese gissu
  Pterothrissus
- Pterygocythereis
  - †Pterygocythereis inexpectata
- †Ptychosalpinx
  - †Ptychosalpinx multirugata
  - †Ptychosalpinx tuomeyi
- Puffinus
  - †Puffinus gravis – or unidentified related form
  - †Puffinus lherminieri
  - †Puffinus pacificoides – or unidentified related form
  - †Puffinus puffinus – or unidentified comparable form
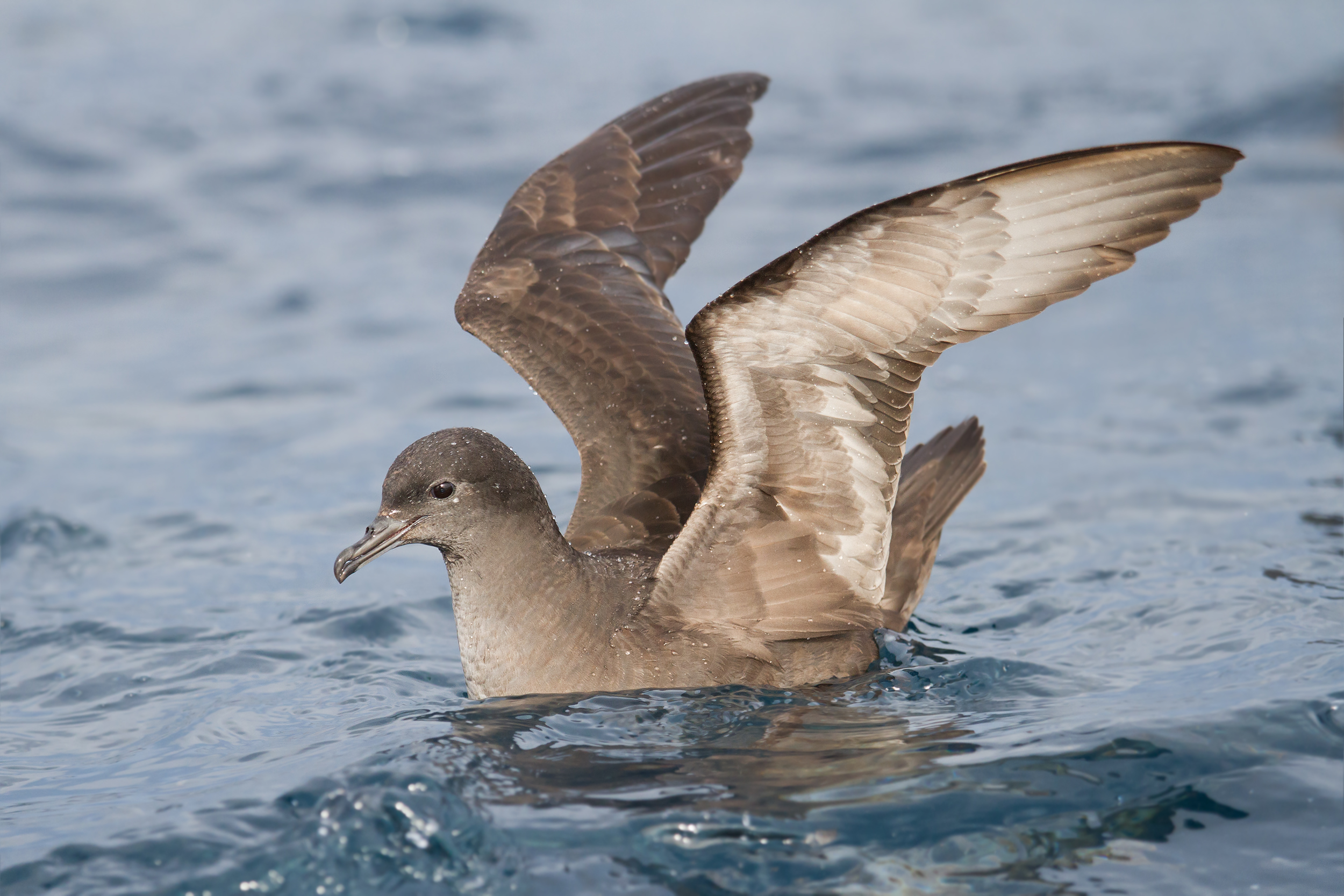
  - A living Ardenna tenuirostris (formerly Puffinus tenuirostris), or short-tailed shearwater
    †Puffinus tenuirostris – or unidentified related form
- Pugnus
  - †Pugnus lachrimula
- Puncturella
- Puriana
  - †Puriana carolinensis
  - †Puriana convoluta
  - †Puriana mesacostalis
  - †Puriana rugipunctata
- Purpura
  - †Purpura cellulosa
- Purpurellus
  - †Purpurellus repetiti – type locality for species
- Pusula
  - †Pusula pediculus
- †Pycnodone
- Pycnodonte
  - †Pycnodonte leeana
  - †Pycnodonte paroxis
  - †Pycnodonte trigonalis
- †Pynonodonte
  - †Pynonodonte trigonalis
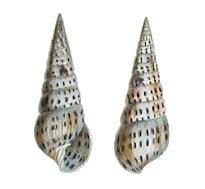
- Illustration in multiple views of the shell of a Pyramidella pyram sea snail
  Pyramidella
  - †Pyramidella crenuata
- †Pyxilla
  - †Pyxilla johnsoniana

== Q ==
- †Quadrans
  - †Quadrans lintea
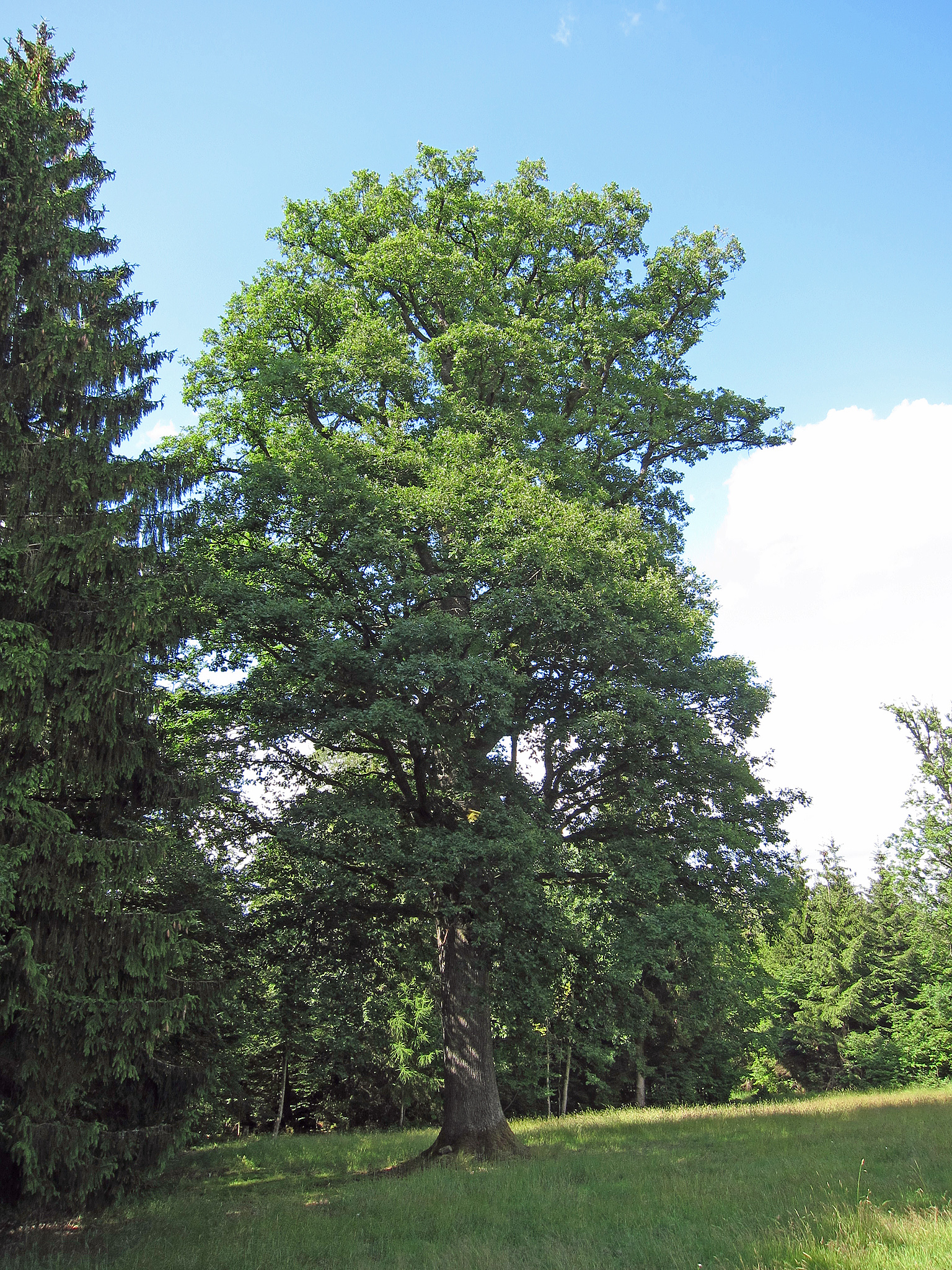
- A living Quercus, or oak tree
  Quercus

== R ==
- Radimella
  - †Radimella confragros
- Radiolucina
  - †Radiolucina amianta
- Raeta
  - †Raeta plicatella
- Raja
- Rangia
  - †Rangia cuneata
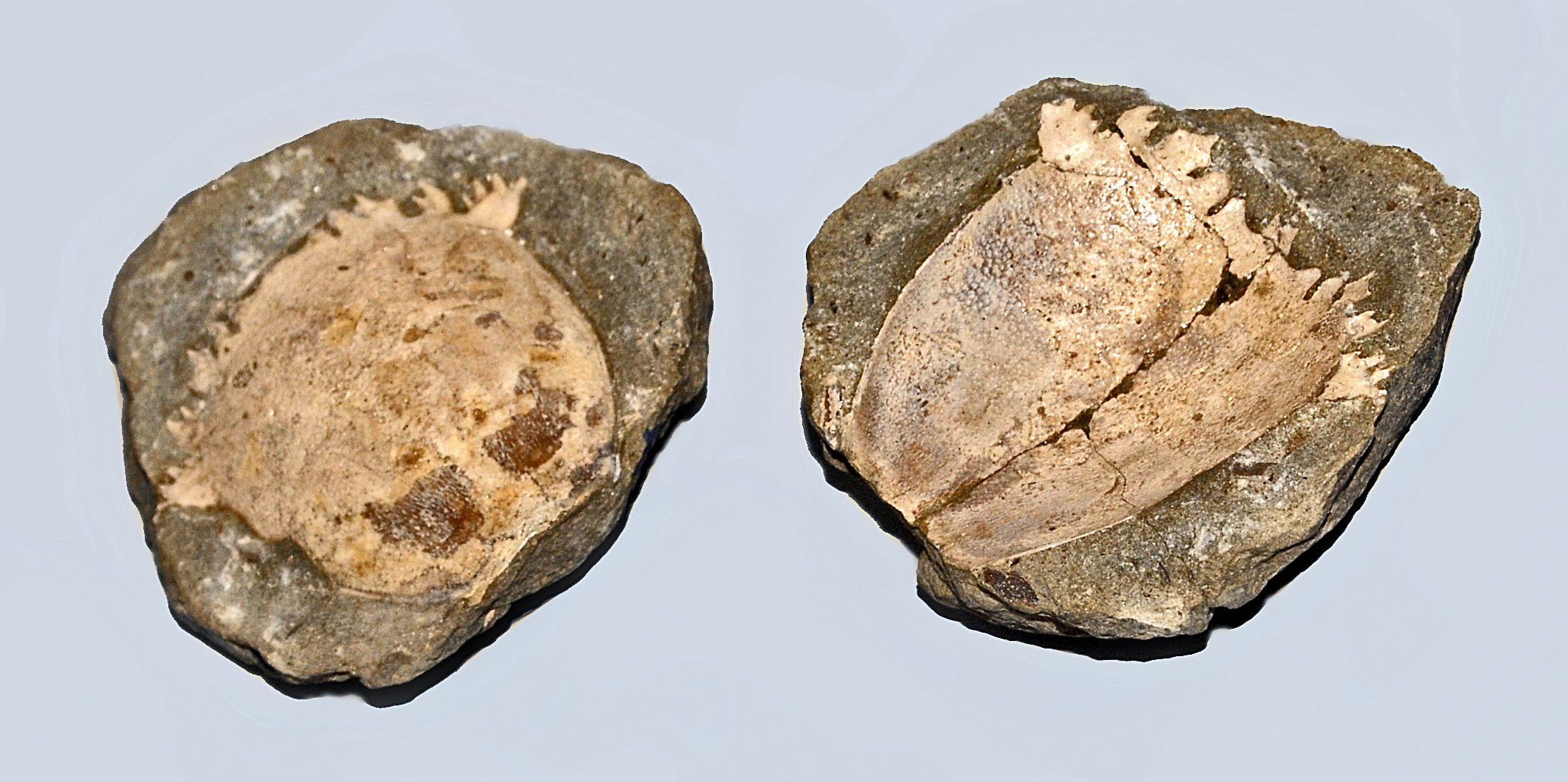
- Fossilized carapace of the Paleogene-modern crab Ranina
  Ranina – type locality for genus
- Ranunculus
- †Raphidodiscus
  - †Raphidodiscus marylandica
- †Rebeccapecten
  - †Rebeccapecten berryae
  - †Rebeccapecten trentensis
- †Recurvaster
- Retilaskeya
  - †Retilaskeya bicolor
- †Rhaphoneis
  - †Rhaphoneis affinis
  - †Rhaphoneis biseriata
  - †Rhaphoneis elegans
  - †Rhaphoneis gemmifera
  - †Rhaphoneis paralis
  - †Rhaphoneis rhombica
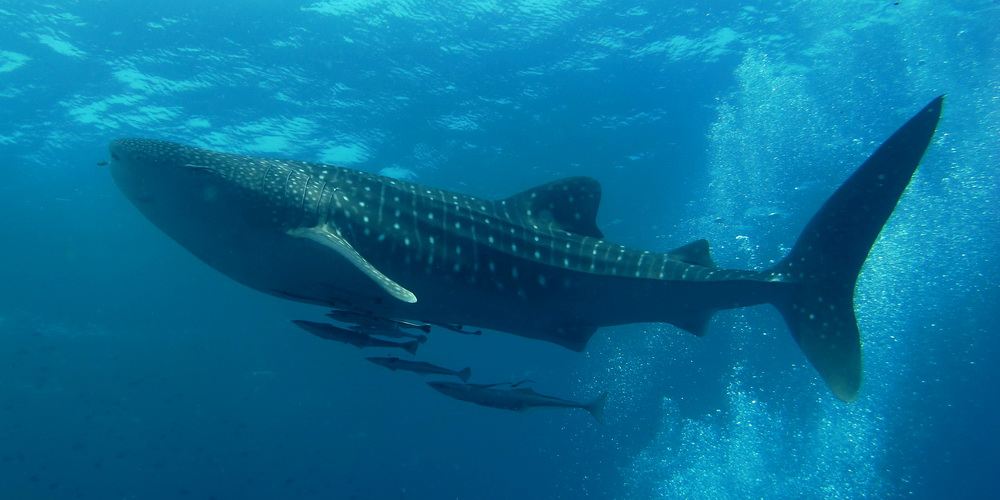
- A living Rhincodon, or whale shark
  Rhincodon
- Rhinobatos
- Rhinoptera
- Rhizoprionodon – tentative report
- †Rhizosolenia
  - †Rhizosolenia bergonii
  - †Rhizosolenia miocenica
- Rhynchobatus
  - †Rhynchobatus pristinus
- Rhyncholampas
  - †Rhyncholampas carolinensis
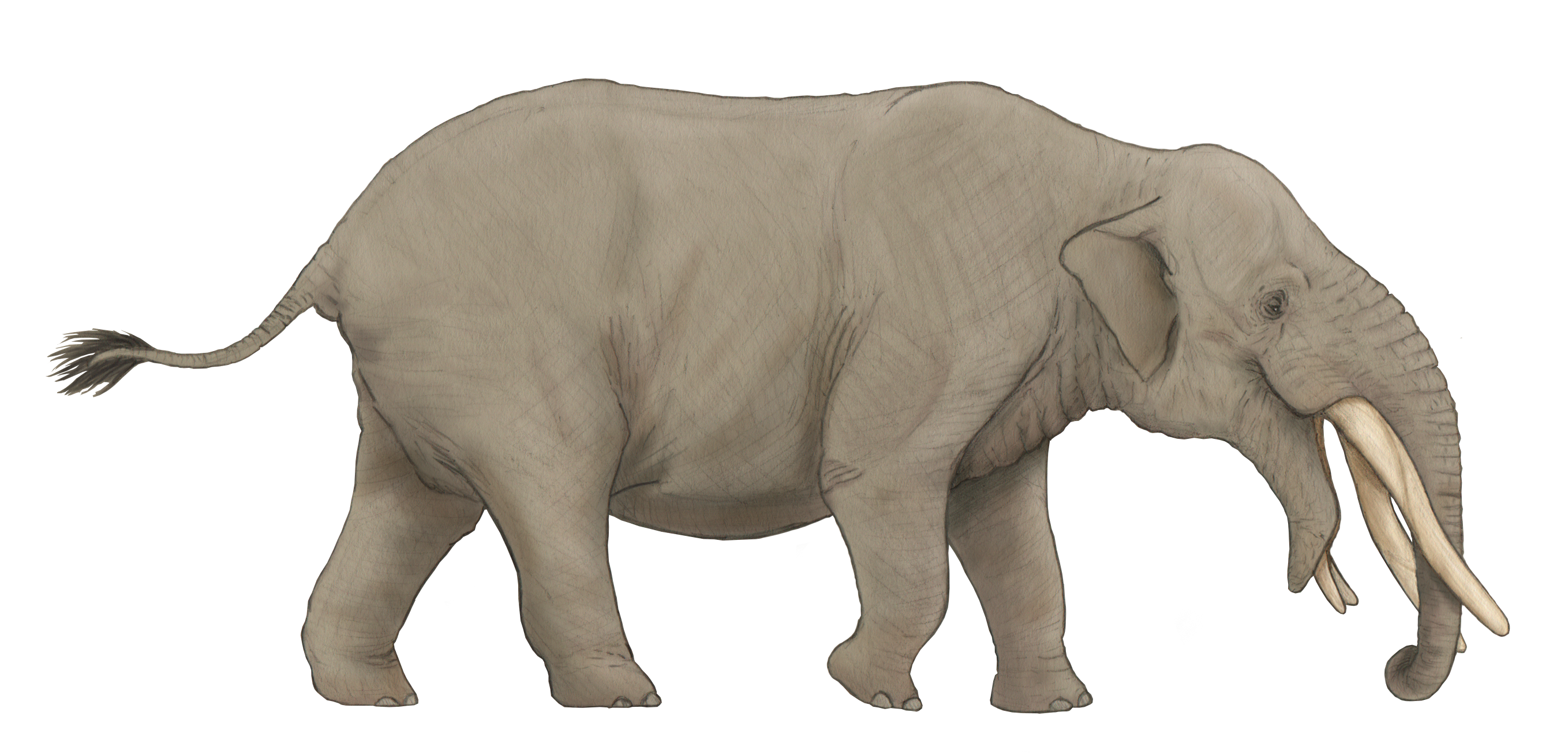
- Restoration of the Miocene-Pliocene elephant relative Rhynchotherium
  †Rhynchotherium
  - †Rhynchotherium euhypodon – or unidentified comparable form
- Ringicula
- Rissoina
  - †Rissoina harpa
- †Robinia – type locality for genus
  - †Robinia striatopunctata – type locality for species
- Rosalina
  - †Rosalina floridana
- †Rouxia
  - †Rouxia californica
  - †Rouxia diploneides
  - †Rouxia naviculoides
  - †Rouxia yabei

== S ==
- Saccella
- Sagittaria
- †Sanguisorba
  - †Sanguisorba canadensis
- †Santeelampas
  - †Santeelampas oviformis
- †Sarda
  - †Sarda sarda – or unidentified related form
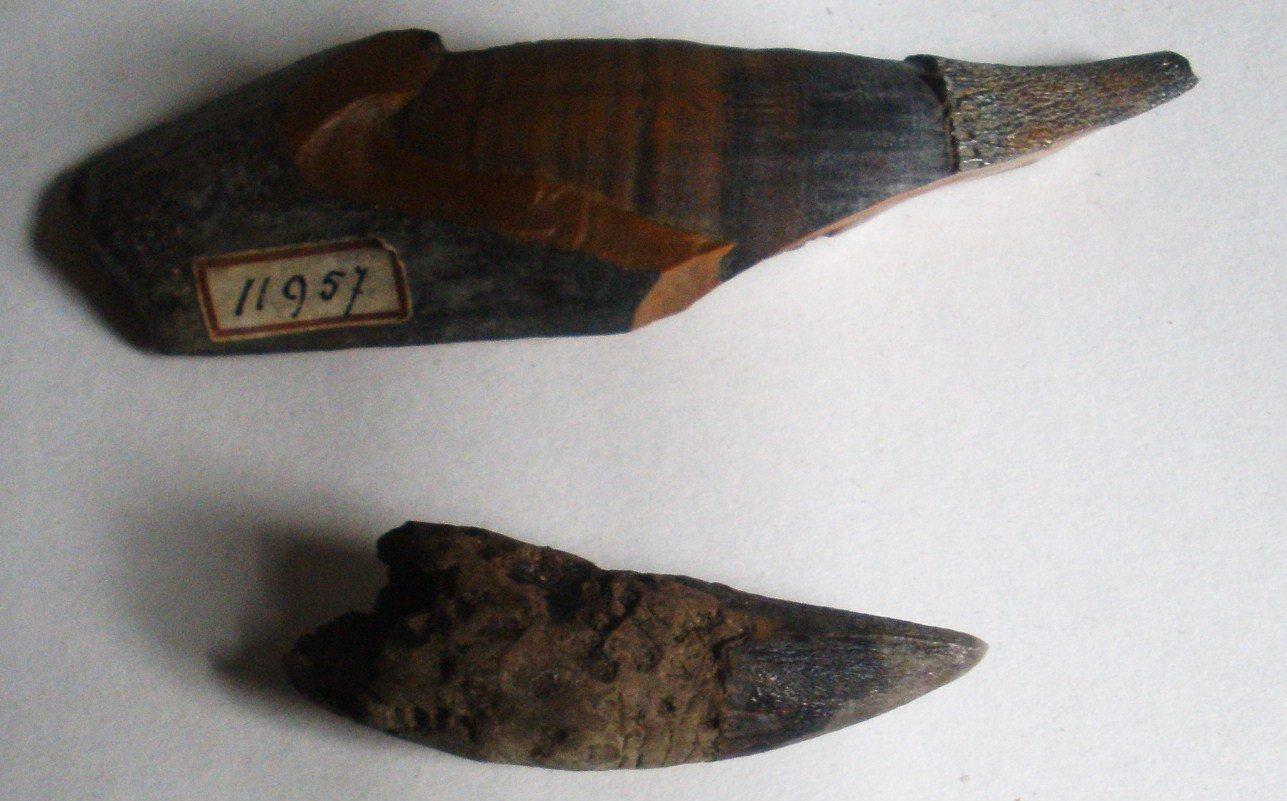
- Fossilized teeth of the Neogene sperm whale Scaldicetus
  †Scaldicetus – or unidentified comparable form
- Scalina
  - †Scalina menthafontis – or unidentified related form
- Scaphella
  - †Scaphella ocalana – tentative report
  - †Scaphella pecursor
  - †Scaphella saintjeani – type locality for species
  - †Scaphella stromboidella – type locality for species
  - †Scaphella trenholmii
- †Sceptroneis
  - †Sceptroneis grandis
- Schizaster
- Sciaenops
  - †Sciaenops ocellata – or unidentified comparable form
  - †Sciaenops ocellatus
- Sclerochilus
  - †Sclerochilus b informal
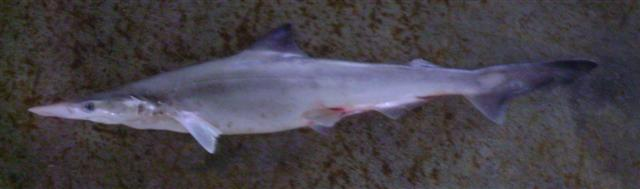
- A living Scoliodon, or spadenose shark
  †Scoliodon
  - †Scoliodon terraenovae
- Sconsia
  - †Sconsia hodgii
- †Scutella
- Scyliorhinus
  - †Scyliorhinus distans
- †Secticarca
  - †Secticarca lienosa
- Seila
  - †Seila adamsii
- Semele
  - †Semele bellastriata
  - †Semele carinata
  - †Semele nuculoides
  - †Semele proficua
  - †Semele subovata
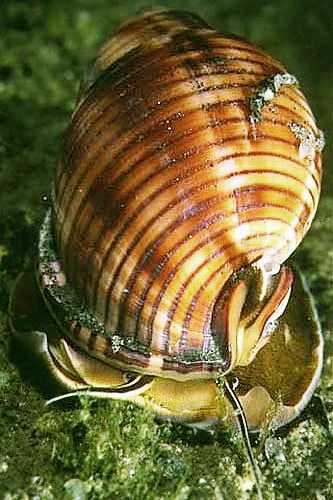
- A living Semicassis helmet sea snail
  Semicassis
  - †Semicassis caelatura
- †Septastrea
  - †Septastrea crassa
- Seriola
- Serpulorbis
  - †Serpulorbis ganifera
  - †Serpulorbis granifera
- †Sheldonia – type locality for genus
  - †Sheldonia trabecula – type locality for species
- Siliqua
  - †Siliqua costata
- Sincola
  - †Sincola anomala
- Sinum
  - †Sinum imperforatum
  - †Sinum maculata
  - †Sinum perspectivum
- Siphocypraea
  - †Siphocypraea carolinensis
- Siphogenerina
  - †Siphogenerina lamellata
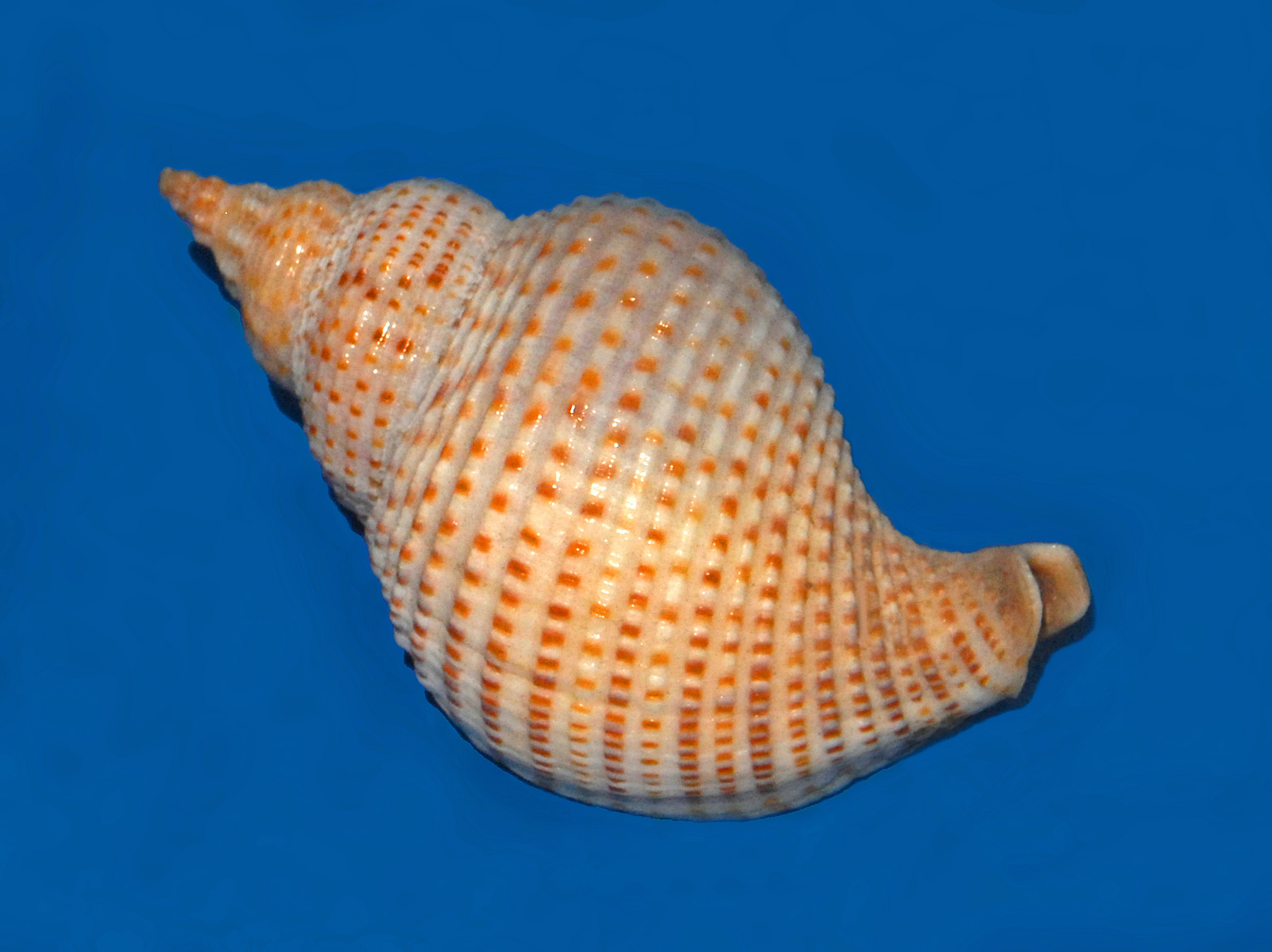
- Shell of the whelk sea snail Siphonalia
  Siphonalia
  - †Siphonalia devexus – or unidentified comparable form
- Siphonochelus
  - †Siphonochelus siphonifera
- Solariella
  - †Solariella gemma
- Solen
  - †Solen viridis
- Solena
- Solenosteira
  - †Solenosteira cancellaria
- Somateria
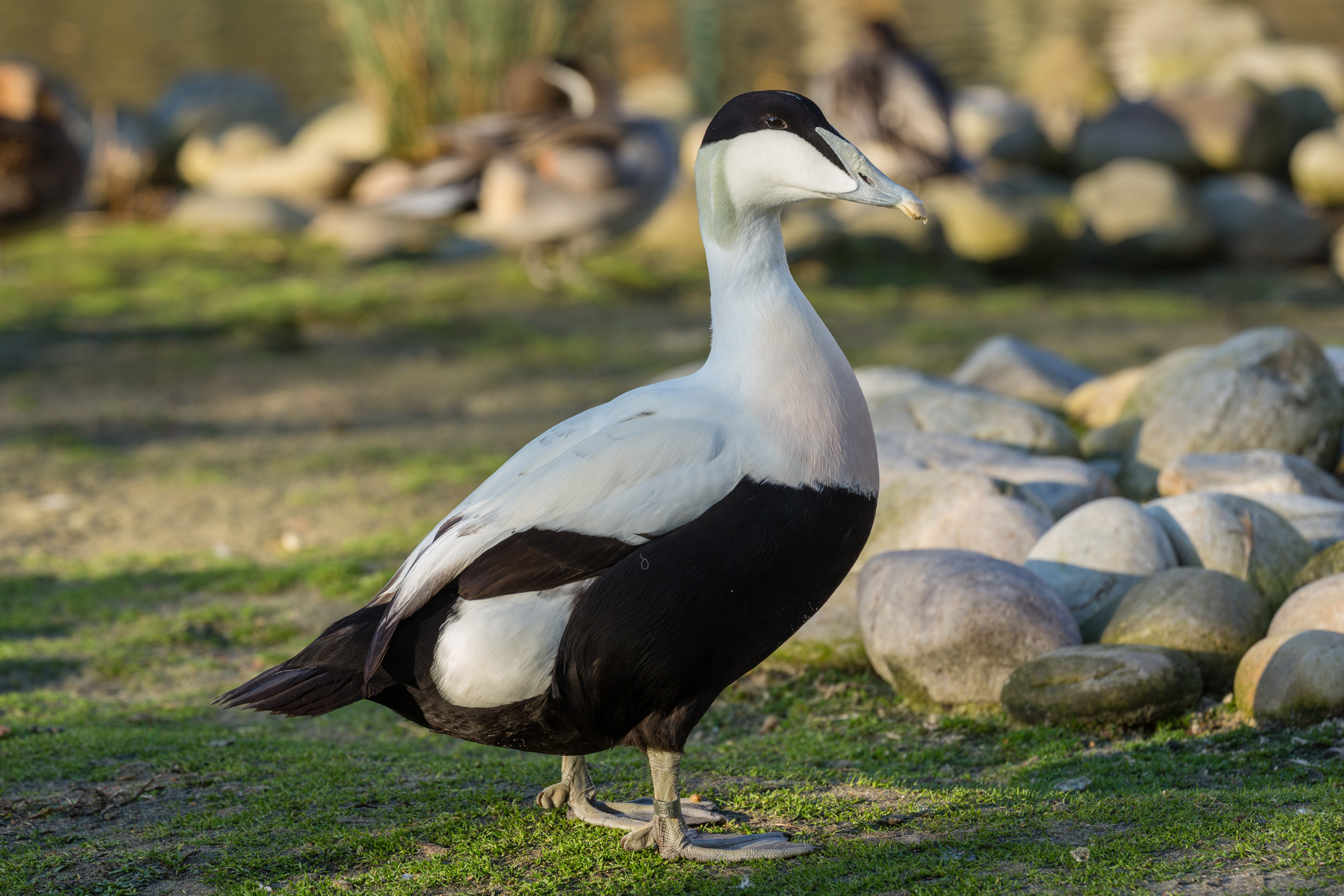
  - A living Somateria mollissima, or common eider
    †Somateria mollissima – or unidentified related form
- †Spathiopora
- Spathipora
- †Sphaeroidinellopsis
  - †Sphaeroidinellopsis seminulina
  - †Sphaeroidinellopsis subdehiscens
- Sphagnum
- Sphenia
  - †Sphenia dubia
- †Sphoeroides
  - †Sphoeroides hyperostosus
- Sphyraena
  - †Sphyraena barracuda – or unidentified comparable form
- Sphyrna
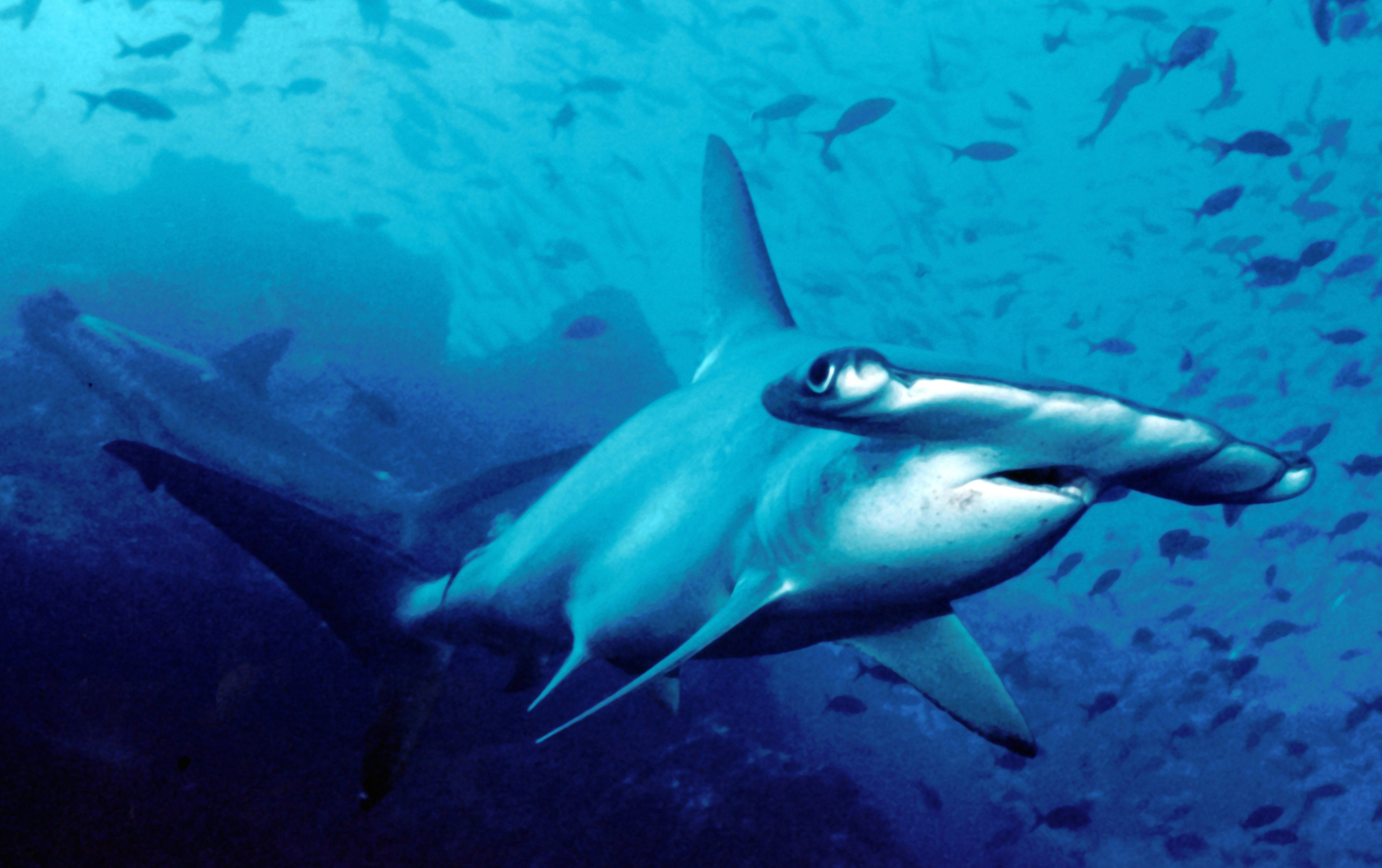
  - A living Sphyrna lewini, or scalloped hammerhead
    †Sphyrna lewini
  - †Sphyrna media – or unidentified comparable form
  - †Sphyrna zygaena
- Spiroplectammina
  - †Spiroplectammina mississippiensis
- Spisula
  - †Spisula modicella
- Spondylus
  - †Spondylus lamellacea – type locality for species
- Sportella
  - †Sportella calpix
  - †Sportella compressa
  - †Sportella constricta
  - †Sportella gibberosa
  - †Sportella waccamawensis
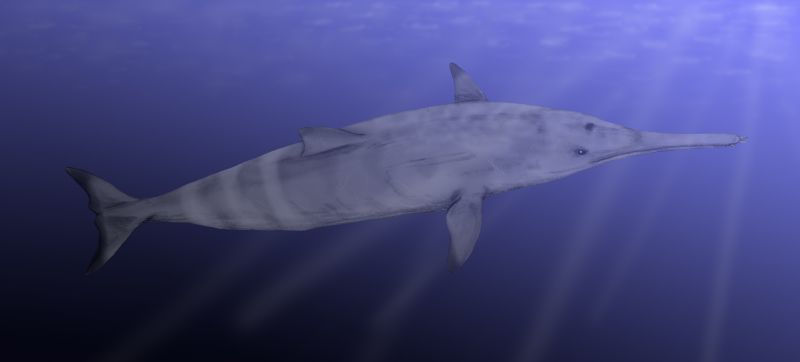
- Life restoration of the Oligocene-Miocene shark-toothed dolphin Squalodon
  †Squalodon
  - †Squalodon calvertensis
  - †Squalodon tiedemani
  - †Squalodon whitmorei – or unidentified comparable form
- Squalus
- Squatina
  - †Squatina subserrata
- Stellatoma – report made of unidentified related form or using admittedly obsolete nomenclature
  - †Stellatoma stellata
- †Stelletta
  - †Stelletta silvigera – type locality for species
- Stenella
  - †Stenella rayi – type locality for species
- †Stenotomus
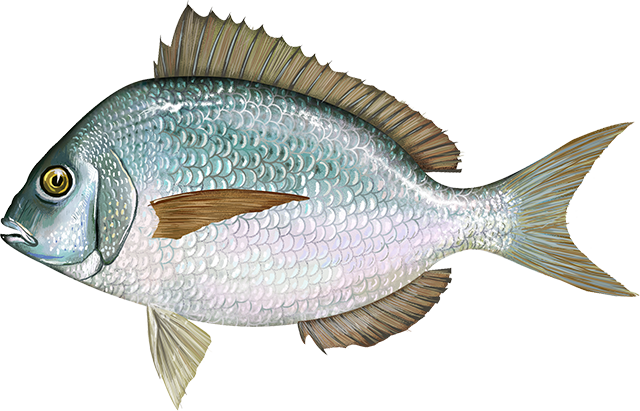
  - Illustration of a living Stenotomus chrysops, or scup
    †Stenotomus chrysops – or unidentified comparable form
- †Stephanogonia
  - †Stephanogonia actinoptychus
- †Stephanopyxis
  - †Stephanopyxis corona
  - †Stephanopyxis grunowii
  - †Stephanopyxis lineata
  - †Stephanopyxis turris
- Stercorarius
  - †Stercorarius longicaudus – or unidentified related form
  - †Stercorarius parasiticus – or unidentified related form
  - †Stercorarius pomarinus – or unidentified related form
- Sterna
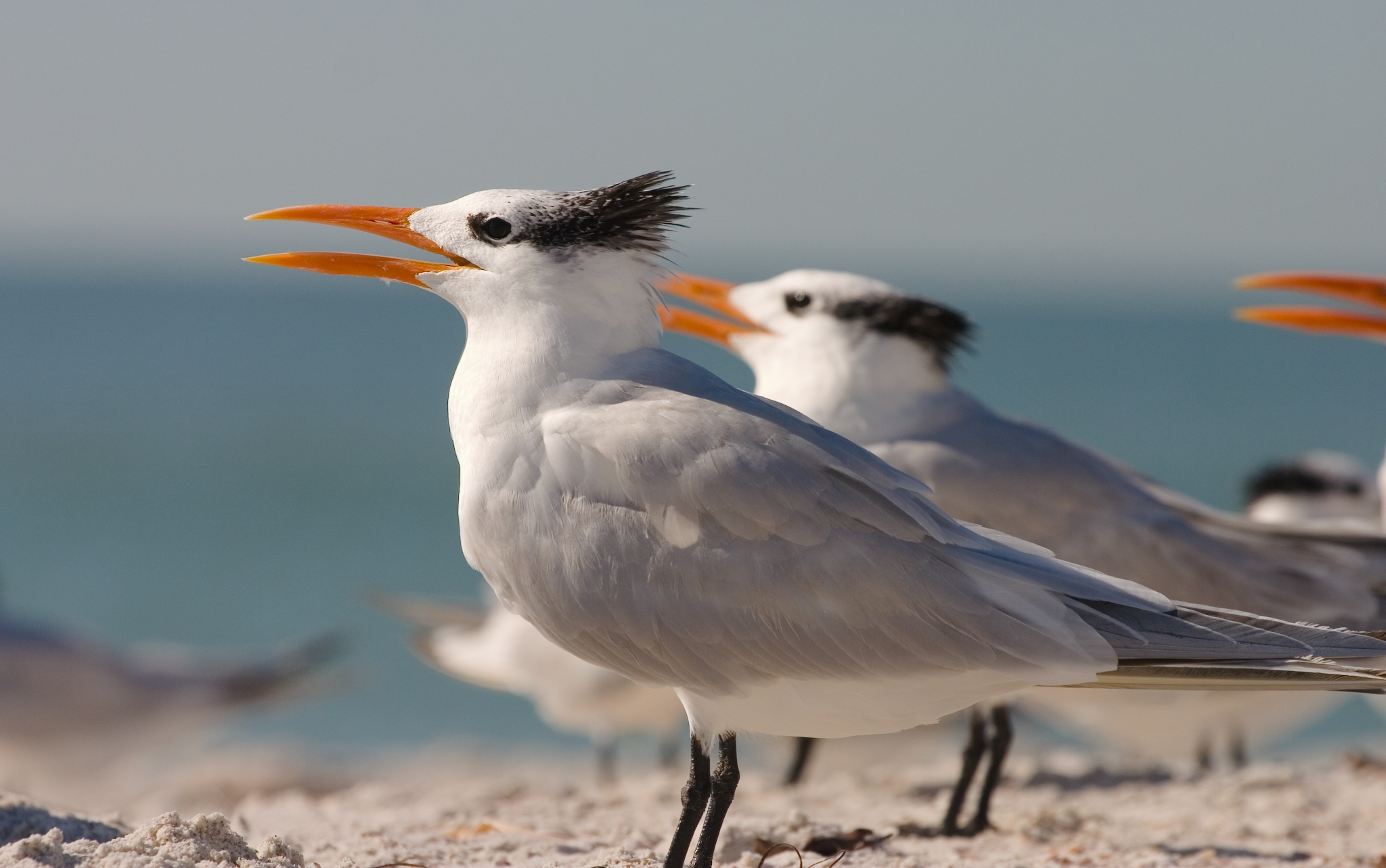
  - A living Thalasseus maximus, or royal tern
    †Sterna maxima – or unidentified related form
  - †Sterna nilotica – or unidentified related form
- Stewartia
  - †Stewartia anodonta
- †Stictodiscus
  - †Stictodiscus kittonianus
- †Streptochetus
  - †Streptochetus indistinctus
- †Striatolamia
  - †Striatolamia macrota
- Strigilla
- †Striostrea
  - †Striostrea gigantissima
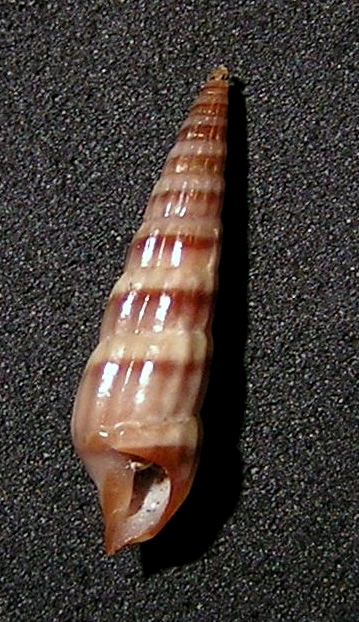
- Shell of a Strioterebrum augur sea snail
  Strioterebrum
  - †Strioterebrum carolinae
  - †Strioterebrum carolinensis
  - †Strioterebrum concava
  - †Strioterebrum dislocata
  - †Strioterebrum dislocatum
  - †Strioterebrum neglecta
  - †Strioterebrum protocta
  - †Strioterebrum robesonensis
- Strombiformis
  - †Strombiformis bartschi
  - †Strombiformis dalli
  - †Strombiformis lina
- Strombina
- Strombus
- †Svratkina
  - †Svratkina croatanensis
- †Syllomus
  - †Syllomus aegyptiacus
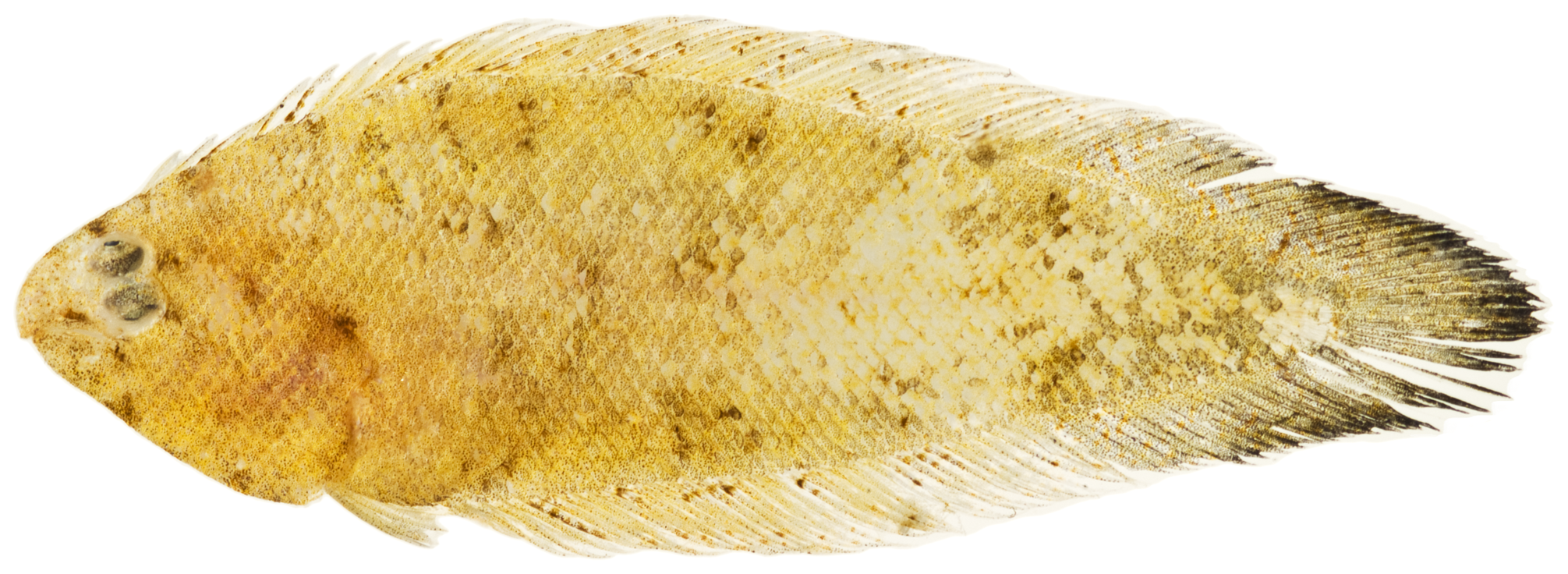
- A living Symphurus tonguefish
  Symphurus
- †Synedra
  - †Synedra jouseana
- Syntomodrillia
  - †Syntomodrillia lissotropis

== T ==
- Tagelus
  - †Tagelus carolinus
  - †Tagelus divisus
  - †Tagelus plebeius
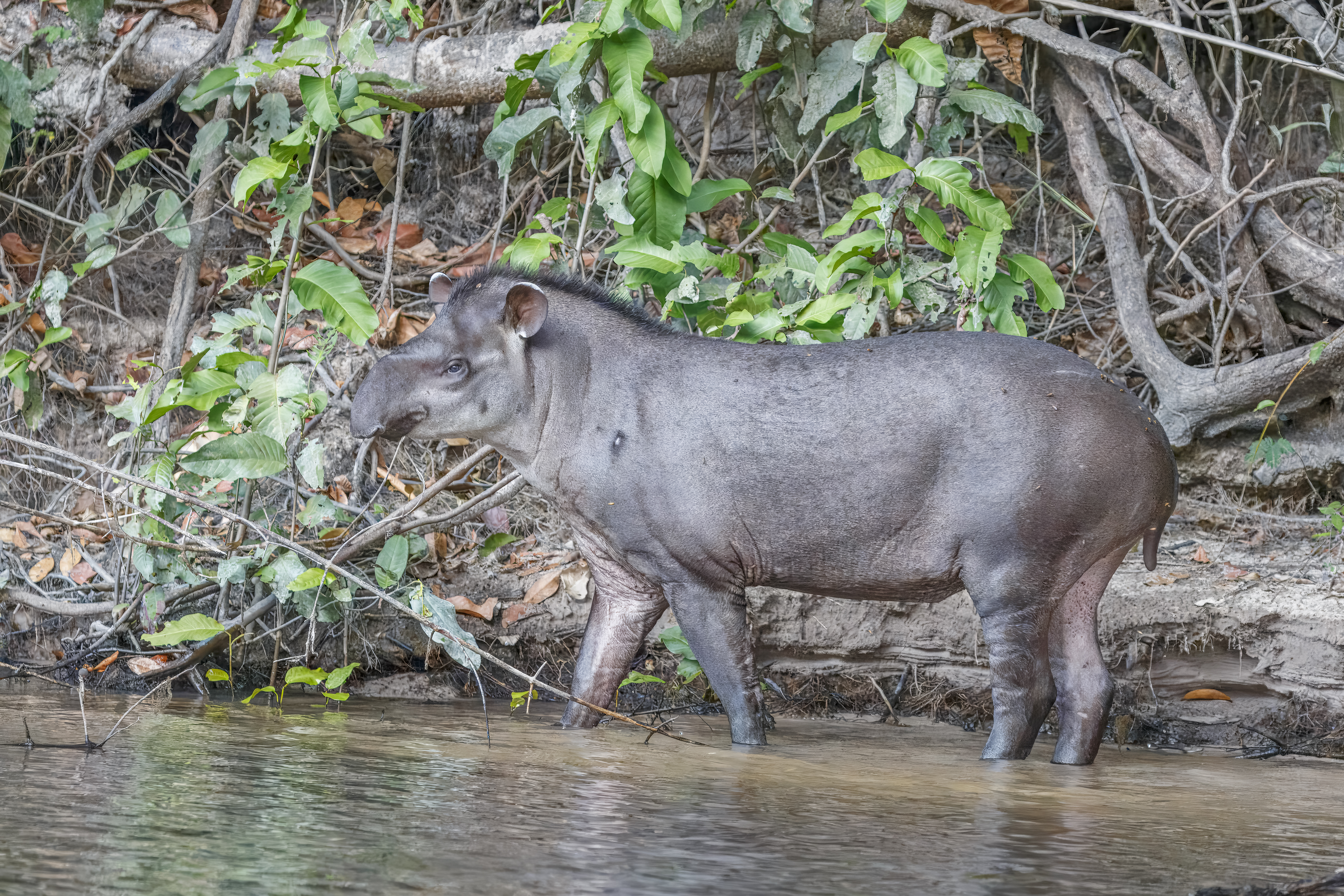
- A living Tapirus, or tapir
  Tapirus
  - †Tapirus veroensis
- Tautoga
  - †Tautoga onitis – or unidentified comparable form
- Taxodium
  - †Taxodium distichum
- Tectonatica
  - †Tectonatica pusilla
- Teinostoma
  - †Teinostoma beaufortensis
  - †Teinostoma gonigyrus
  - †Teinostoma smikron
  - †Teinostoma smirkon
  - †Teinostoma tectispira
- Tellidora
  - †Tellidora cristata
- Tellina
  - †Tellina dupliniana
  - †Tellina macilenta
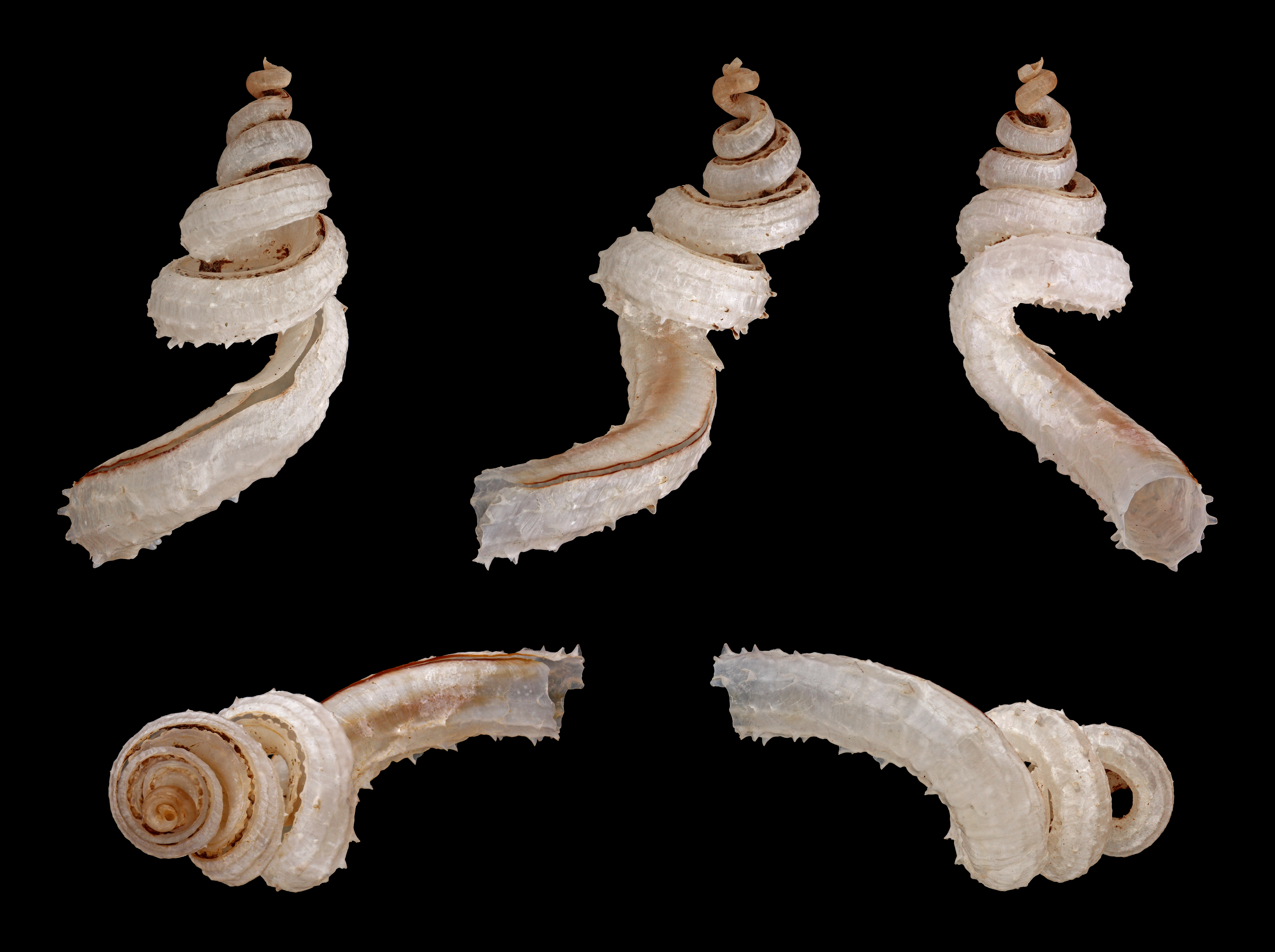
- Shell in multiple views of a Tenagodus sea snail
  Tenagodus
  - †Tenagodus vitis
  - †Tenagodus vitus – or unidentified comparable form
- Terebra
  - †Terebra divisura
  - †Terebra protexta
  - †Terebra unilineata
- Terebratula
  - †Terebratula crassa – type locality for species
- Terebratulina
  - †Terebratulina capillata – type locality for species
  - †Terebratulina lachryma
  - †Terebratulina wilmingtonensis
- Terebripora
- †Tetraedron
- †Tetrapturus
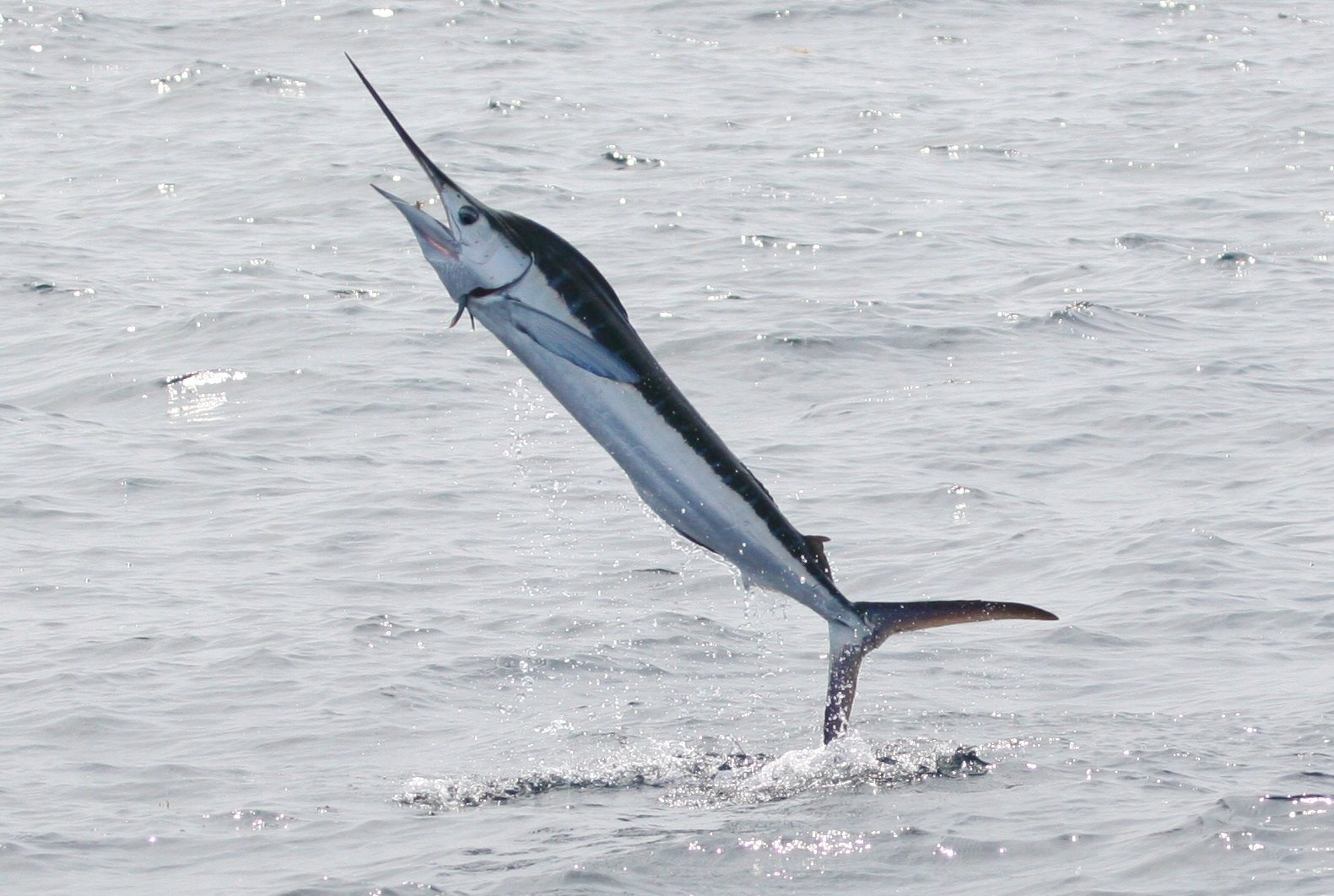
  - A living Kajikia albida, or white marlin
    †Tetrapturus albidus
- Thaerocythere
  - †Thaerocythere carolinensis
  - †Thaerocythere schmidtae
- Thais
- †Thalassinoides
- †Thalassionema
  - †Thalassionema nitzschiodes
- †Thalassiosira
  - †Thalassiosira a informal
  - †Thalassiosira b informal
- †Thalassiothix
  - †Thalassiothix longissima
- †Thalictrum
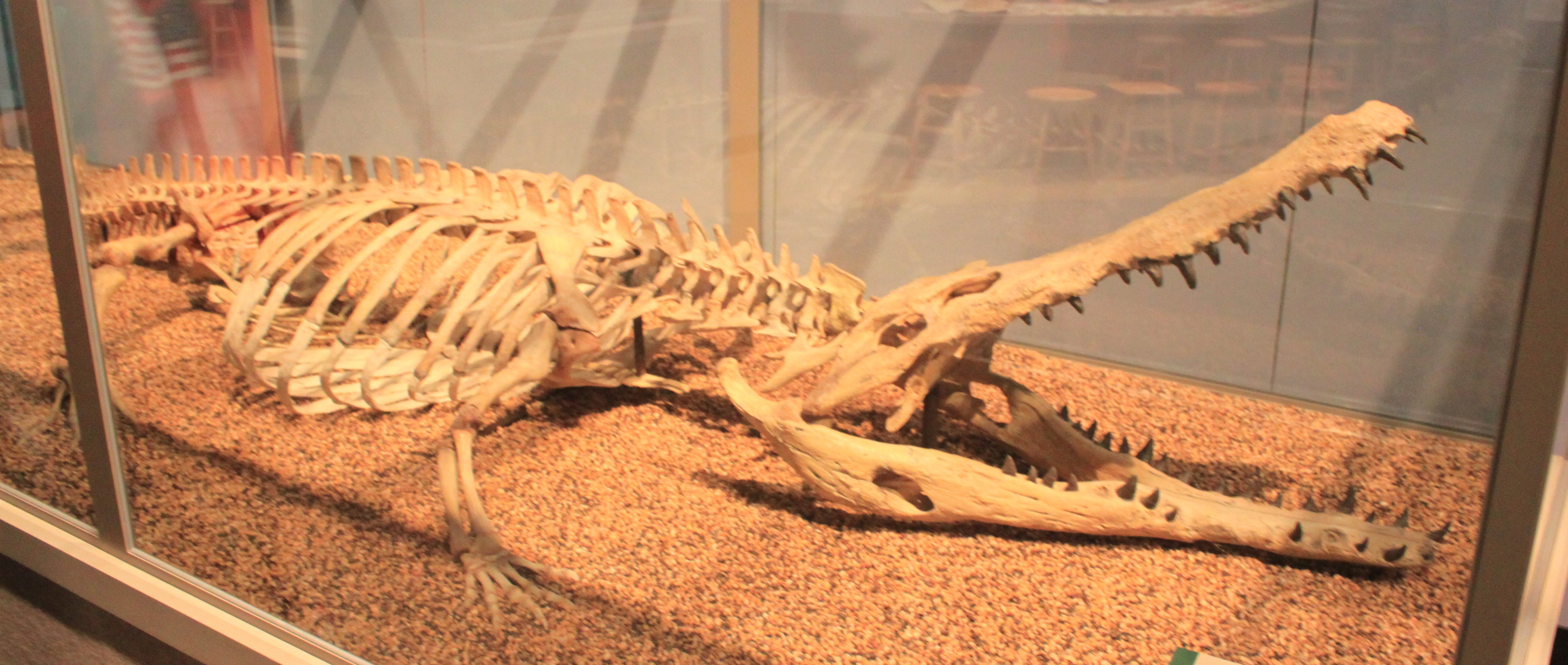
- Fossilized skeleton of the Oligocene-Miocene gavial relative Thecachampsa
  †Thecachampsa
  - †Thecachampsa antiqua
- Thracia
  - †Thracia brioni
  - †Thracia conradi
  - †Thracia transversa
- Thunnus
  - †Thunnus thynnus
- Timoclea
  - †Timoclea grus
- Titanocarcinus
  - †Titanocarcinus euglyphos
- Torcula
- †Tornatellaea
- †Tortifusus
  - †Tortifusus curvirostrus
- Trachycardium
  - †Trachycardium emmonsi
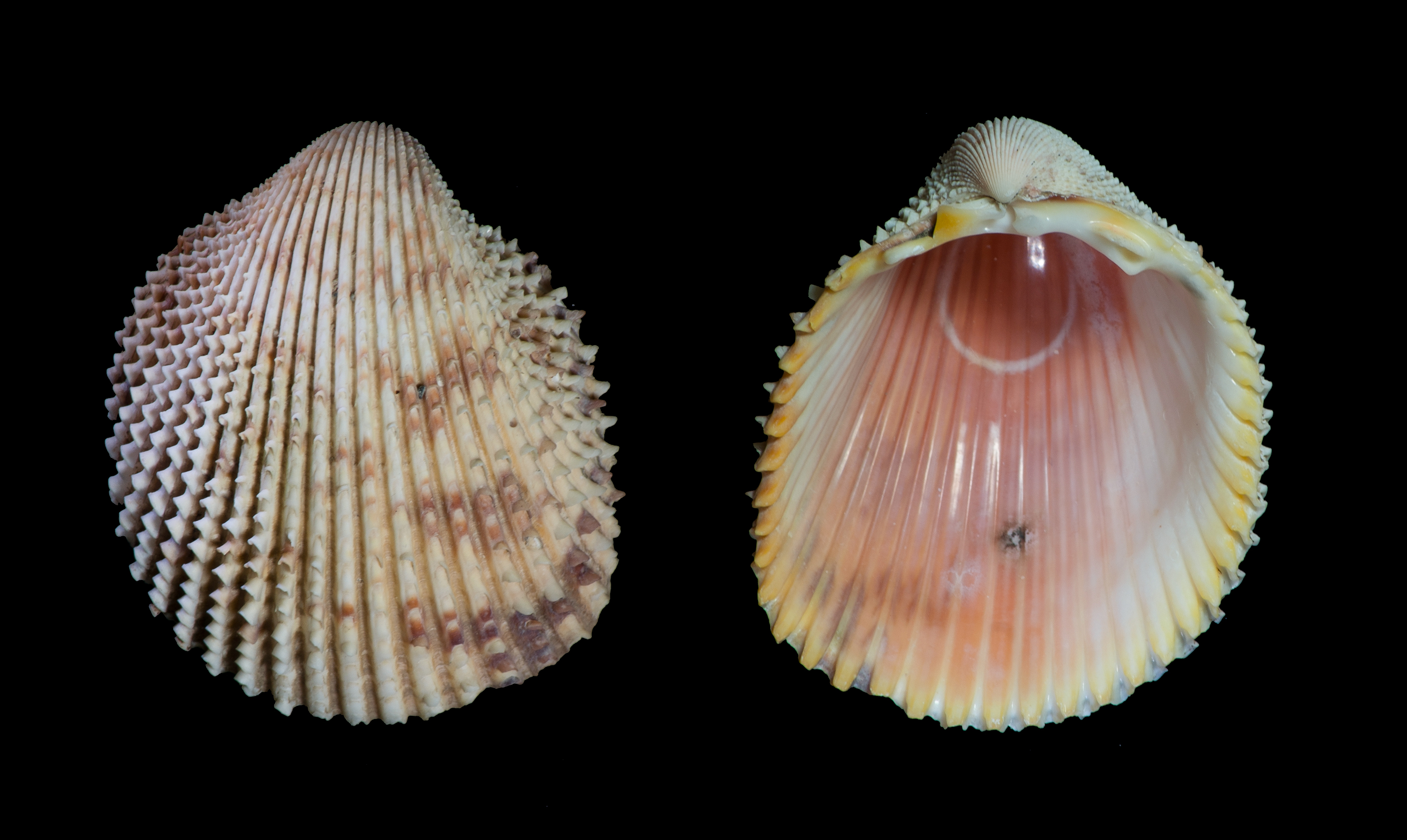
  - Exterior and interior of the shell of a Trachycardium isocardia, or West Indian prickly cockle
    †Trachycardium isocardia
  - †Trachycardium muricatum
- Trajana
  - †Trajana pyta – type locality for species
- Transennella
  - †Transennella carolinensis
  - †Transennella stimpsoni
- †Tretosphys
- †Triaenodon
  - †Triaenodon obesus
- †Triceratium
  - †Triceratium condecorum
  - †Triceratium subrotundatum
  - †Triceratium tessellatum
- †Triginglymus
- Trigoniocardia
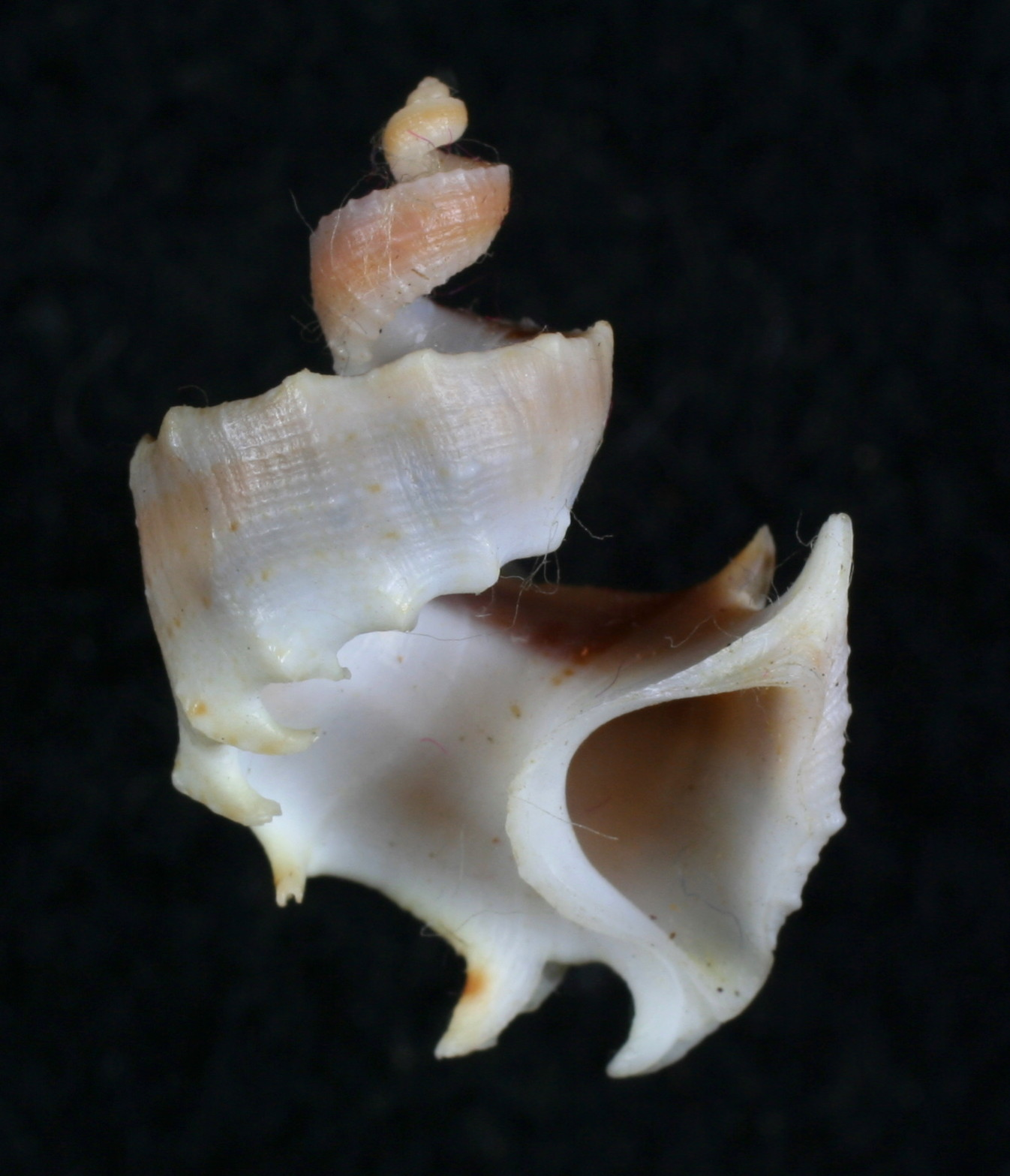
- Shell of a Trigonostoma nutmeg sea snail
  Trigonostoma
- Trigonulina
  - †Trigonulina emmonsii
- †Trinacria
  - †Trinacria excavata
- Tringa
  - †Tringa ochropus – or unidentified related form
- Trionyx
  - †Trionyx buiei – type locality for species
- Triphora
- †Tritonopsis
  - †Tritonopsis biconica
  - †Tritonopsis gilletti
- Trochita
  - †Trochita aperta
  - †Trochita crenata – or unidentified comparable form
- †Trochosira
  - †Trochosira concava
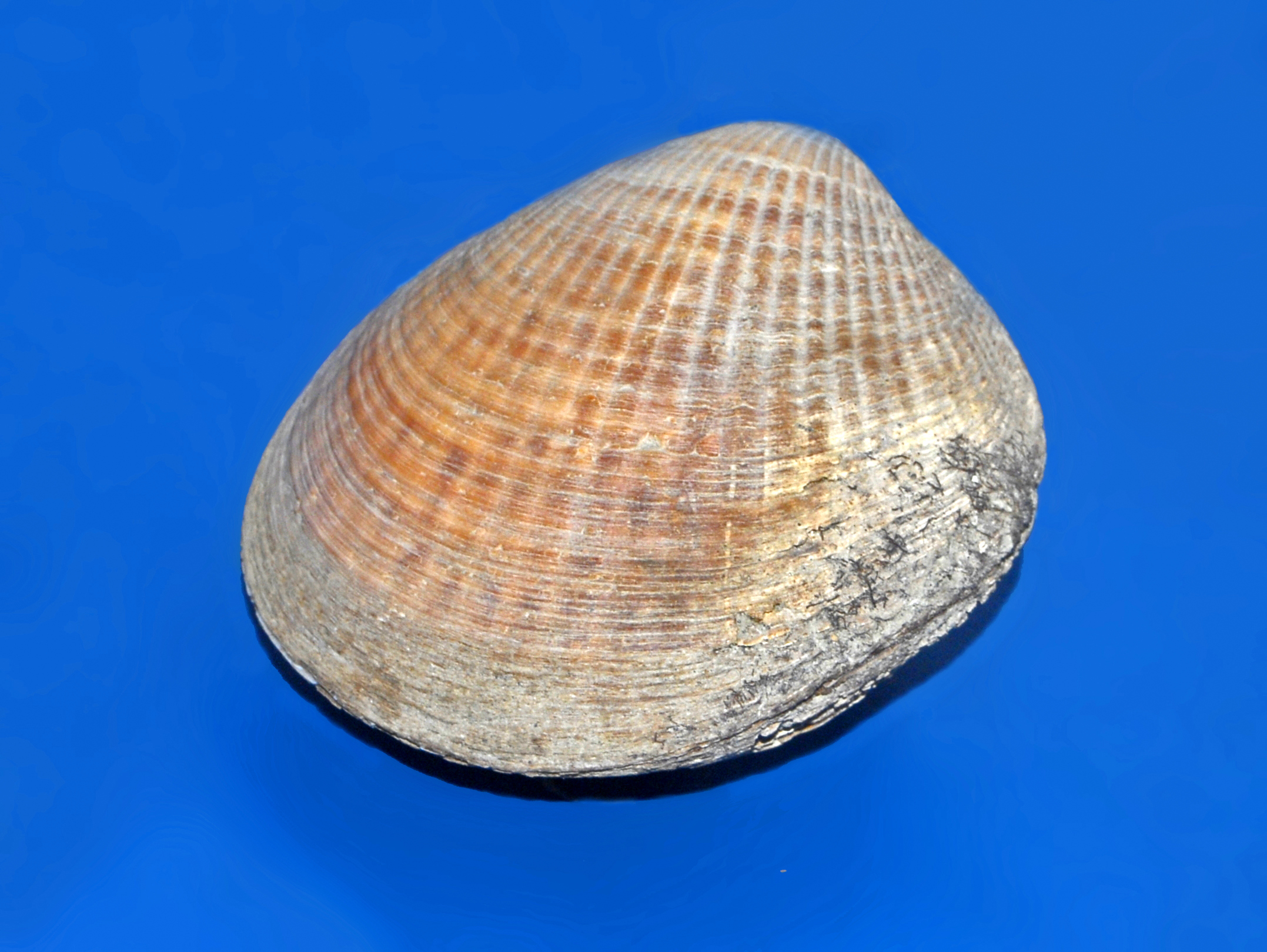
- Shell of a Tucetona bittersweet clam
  Tucetona
  - †Tucetona arata
- Turbo
  - †Turbo castanea
- Turbonilla
  - †Turbonilla abrupta
  - †Turbonilla daedaleum
  - †Turbonilla interrupta
  - †Turbonilla nivea
- †Turborotalia
  - †Turborotalia acostaensis
  - †Turborotalia birnageae
  - †Turborotalia humilis
  - †Turborotalia inflata
  - †Turborotalia quinqueloba
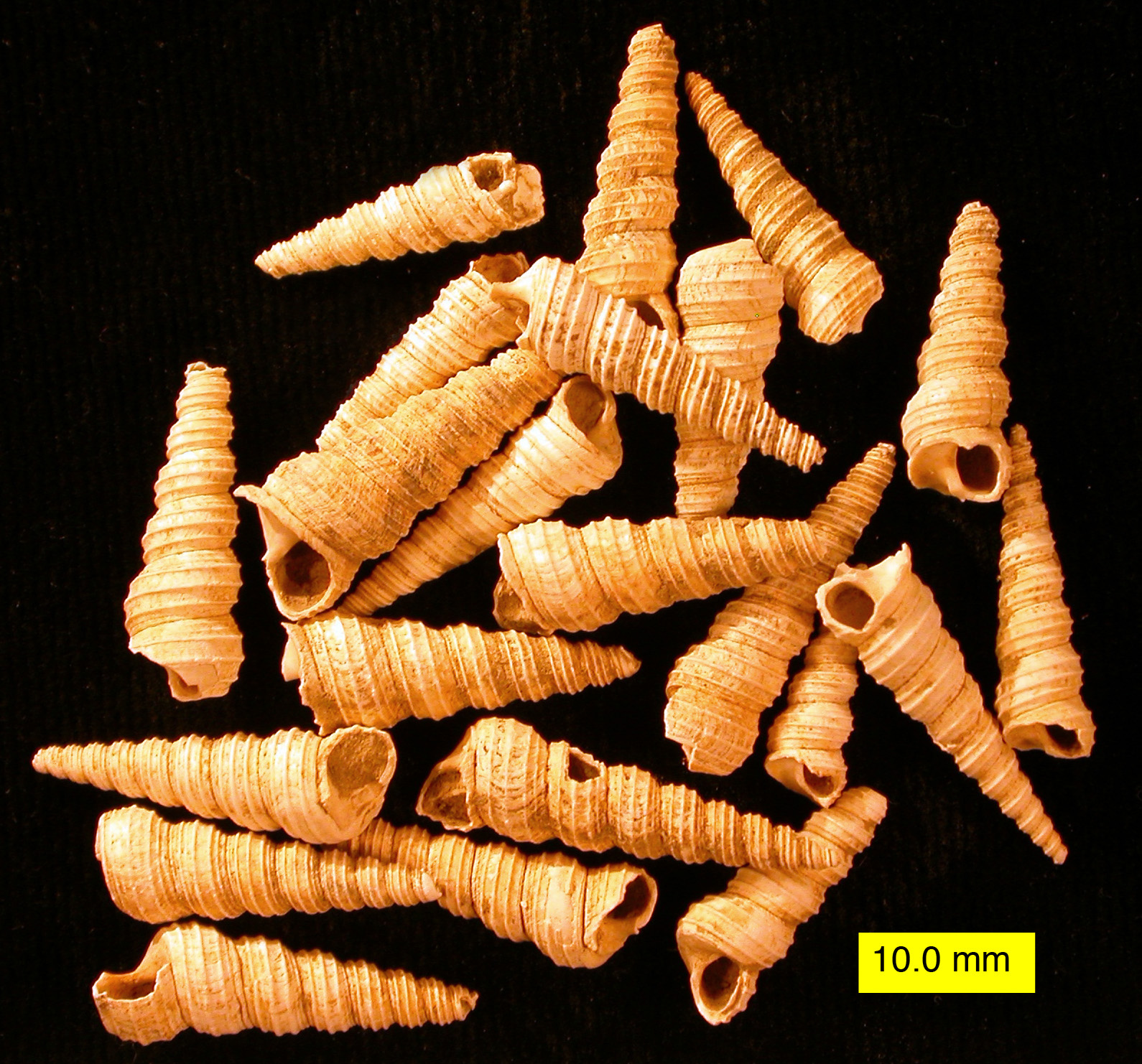
- Fossilized shells of the Late Jurassic-modern tower snail Turritella
  Turritella
  - †Turritella aequistriata – or unidentified comparable form
  - †Turritella beaufortensis
  - †Turritella caelatura
  - †Turritella cumberlandia – or unidentified comparable form
  - †Turritella fuerta – type locality for species
  - †Turritella indenta – or unidentified comparable form
  - †Turritella neusensis – type locality for species
  - †Turritella perexilis
  - †Turritella plebea
  - †Turritella prexellis
  - †Turritella subanulata
  - †Turritella subtilis – type locality for species
  - †Turritella tampae
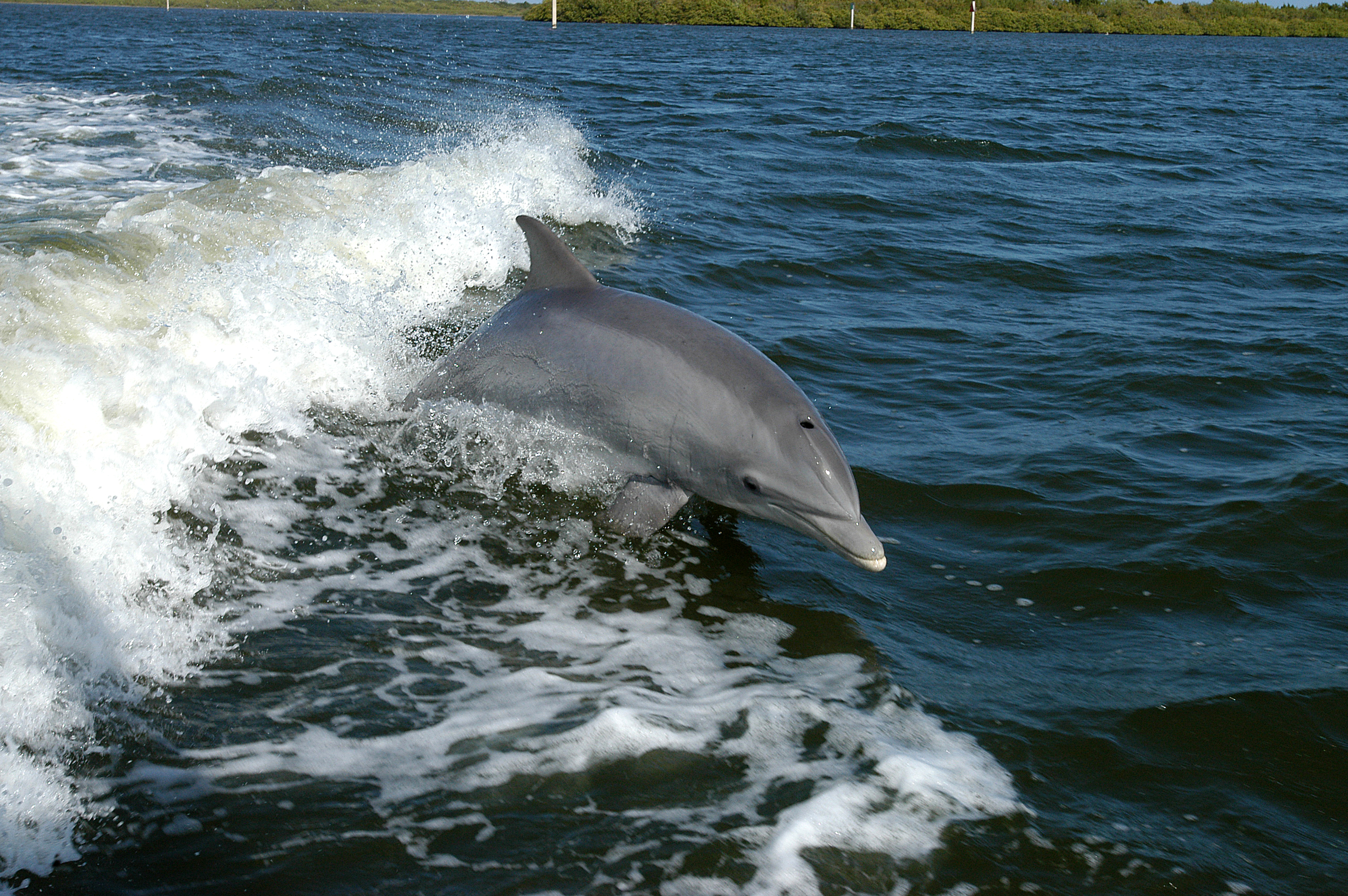
- A living Tursiops, or bottlenose dolphin
  Tursiops
- Typha
- Typhis
  - †Typhis harrisi

== U ==
- †Unifascia
  - †Unifascia carolinensis
- Uromitra
- Urophycis
  - †Urophycis tenuis
- Urosalpinx
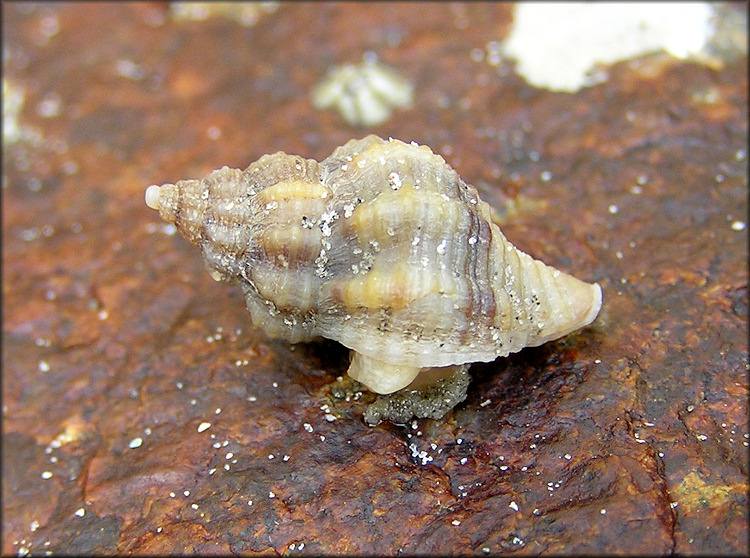
  - A living Urosalpinx sea snail, or oyster drill
    †Urosalpinx cinerea
  - †Urosalpinx perrugata
  - †Urosalpinx phrikna
  - †Urosalpinx stimpsoni
  - †Urosalpinx suffolkensis
  - †Urosalpinx trossula

== V ==
- Vasum
  - †Vasum wilmingtonense
- Venericardia
  - †Venericardia nodifera – type locality for species
- Vermicularia
  - †Vermicularia knorrii – or unidentified comparable form
  - †Vermicularia spirata
- †Verrucocoeloidea
  - †Verrucocoeloidea corallina – type locality for species
- Verticordia
  - †Verticordia emmonsii
- Vexillum
  - †Vexillum wandoense
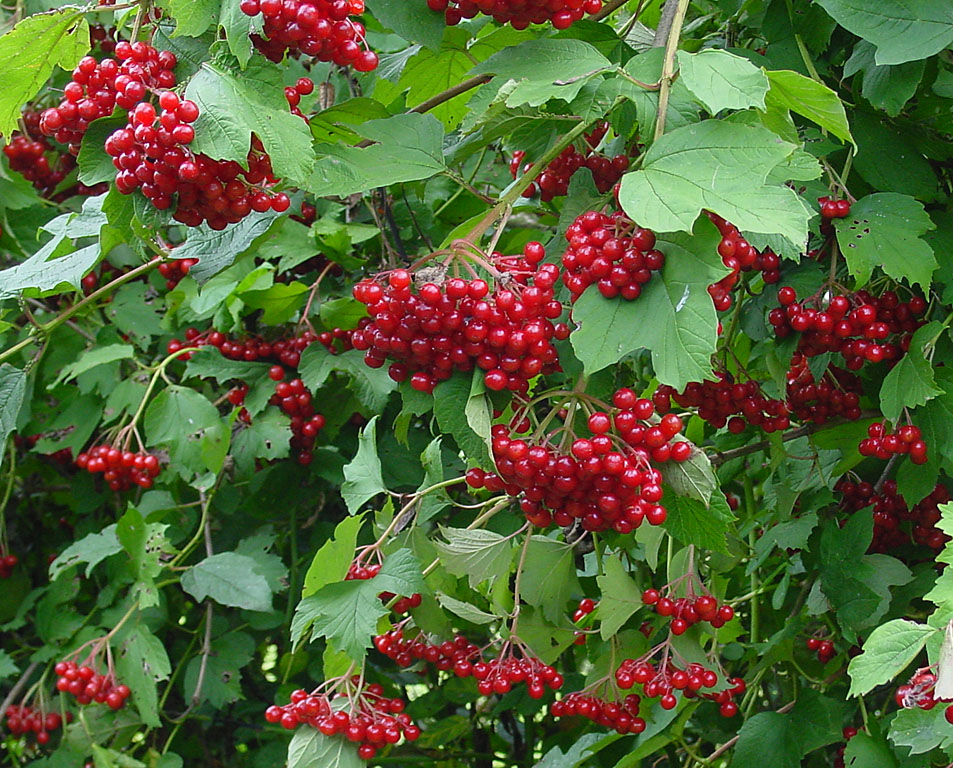
- Leaves and fruit of a living Viburnum.
  †Viburnum
- †Virgulina
  - †Virgulina fusiformis
- Viviparus – tentative report
  - †Viviparus lyelli
- Volutifusus
  - †Volutifusus obtusa
  - †Volutifusus typhis
- Volvarina
  - †Volvarina avena

== W ==
- †Wilsonimaia
  - †Wilsonimaia ethelae

== X ==
- †Xanthiopyxis
- Xenophora
- Xestoleberis
  - †Xestoleberis e informal
  - †Xestoleberis ventrostriata
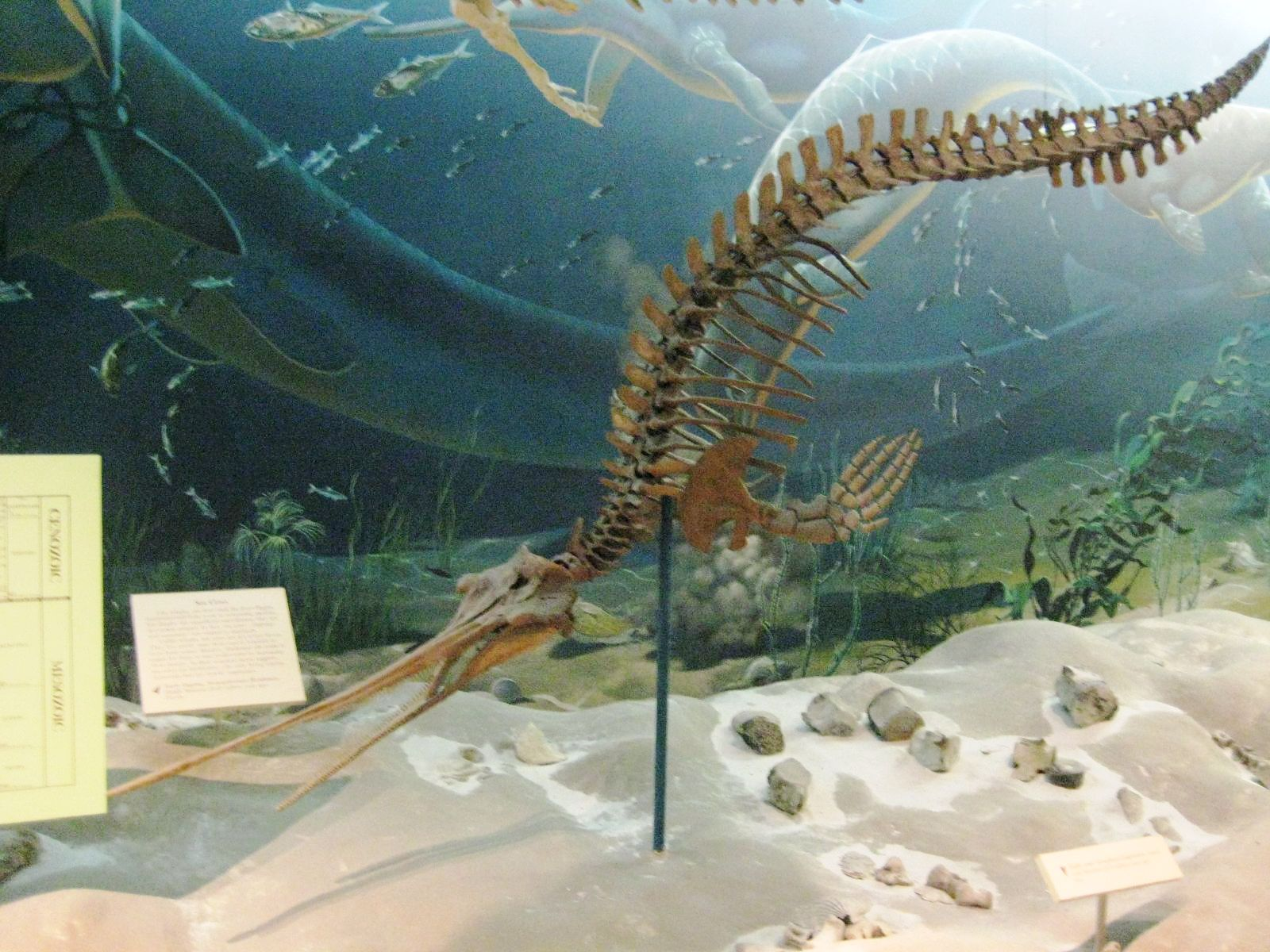
- Fossilized skeleton of the Miocene whale Xiphiacetus
  †Xiphiacetus
- Xiphias
  - †Xiphias gladius
- †Xiphiorhynchus
  - †Xiphiorhynchus antiquus

== Y ==
- Yoldia
  - †Yoldia laevis
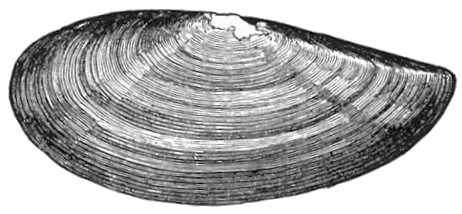
  - Illustration of the shell of a Yoldia limatula, or file yoldia
    †Yoldia limatula
  - †Yoldia limulata
  - †Yoldia serica

== Z ==
- Ziphius
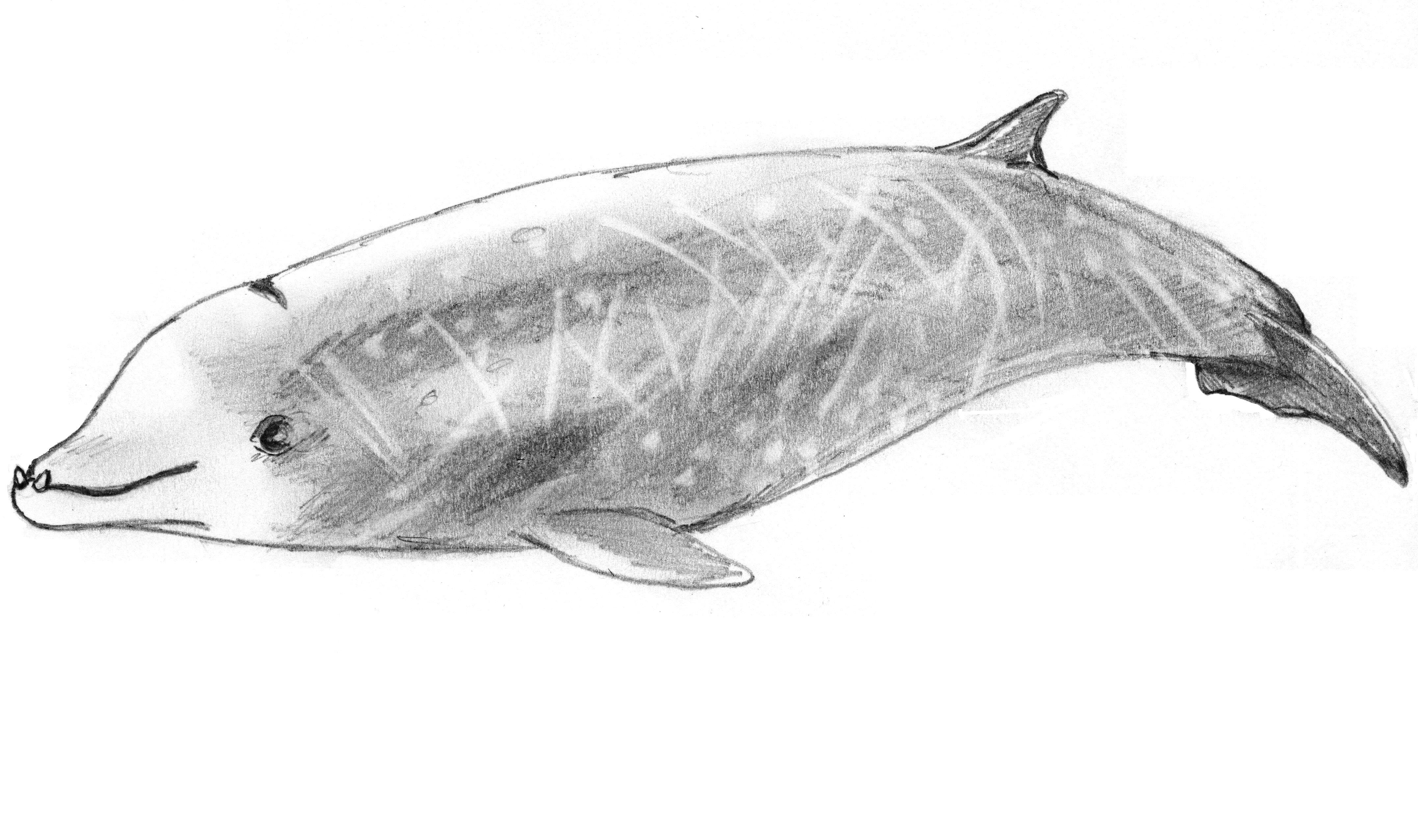
  - Illustration of a living Ziphius cavirostris, or Cuvier's beaked whale
    †Ziphius cavirostris – or unidentified comparable form
