= Green sea urchin =

Several species of sea urchin share the name green sea urchin:

- Lytechinus variegatus, also known as the variegated sea urchin
- Psammechinus microtuberculatus, occurs in the Atlantic Ocean, Adriatic Sea, Aegean Sea and Mediterranean
- Psammechinus miliaris, also known as the shore sea urchin
- Strongylocentrotus droebachiensis, common in northern waters all around the world
