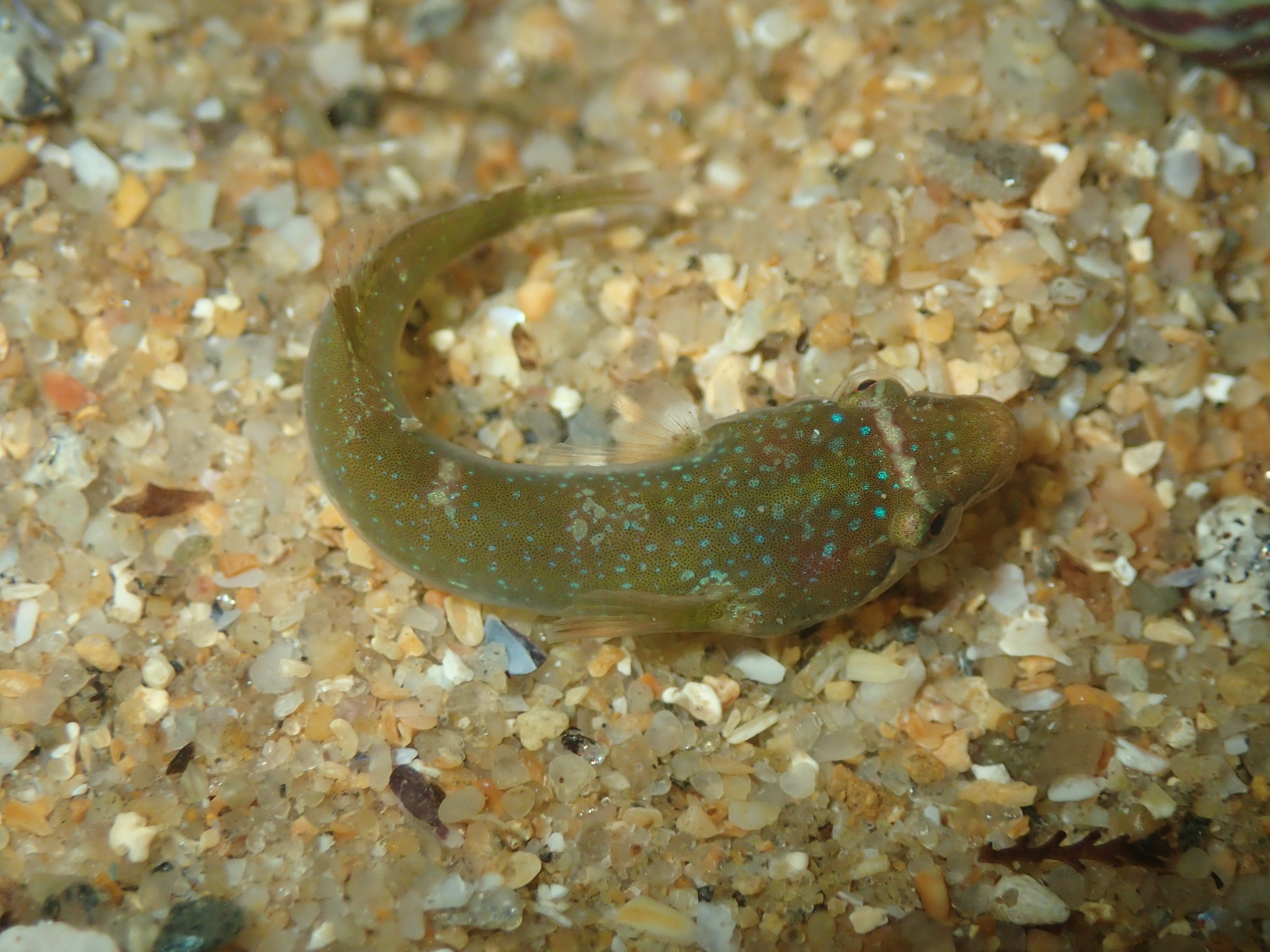

Conservation status
- Least Concern (IUCN 3.1)

Scientific classification
- Kingdom: Animalia
- Phylum: Chordata
- Class: Actinopterygii
- Order: Blenniiformes
- Family: Gobiesocidae
- Genus: Apletodon
- Species: A. dentatus

Binomial name
- Apletodon dentatus (Facciolà, 1887)

Synonyms
- Lepadogaster dentatus Facciolà, 1887; Lepadogaster microcephalus Brook, 1890; Apletodon microcephalus (Brook, 1890); Lepadogaster stictopteryx Holt & Byrne, 1899

= Apletodon dentatus =

Species of fish

Apletodon dentatus, the small-headed clingfish, is a species of clingfish from the family Gobiesocidae. It is a benthic fish of shallow, rocky water on the coasts of the eastern Atlantic Ocean and the western Mediterranean Sea.

== Description ==
Apletodon dentatus is small growing to a maximum length of 4 centimetres (1.6 in). When viewed from above it can be seen to have a depressed triangular head. The dorsal and anal fin are short, rounded and located close to the caudal fin which is also rounded, as is the pectoral fin. The pelvic fin has been modified to form a suction disc which is used to stick onto the substrate. Its colour is variable; it is frequently green with darker mottling, or reddish-brown dotted with dark brown, and it has large white dorsal spots. The adult males can show a large black or purple blotch on the dorsal and anal fins and purple patches on their throat. It can show a white band behind the eyes and a stripe through each eye.

== Distribution ==
Apletodon dentatus is found in the eastern North Atlantic Ocean and the western Mediterranean Sea. In the Atlantic the northernmost extent is in western Scotland and it extends as far south as Morocco. It is found around the Canary Islands and the Azores. In the Mediterranean it has been recorded from as far east as Cyprus.

== Habitat and biology ==
Apletodon dentatus occurs in the tidal and subtidal zones where it is associated with submerged vegetation such as the sea grass Posidonia oceanica off France, with beds of the large brown algae of the genus Cystoseira off Sicily, and with rocky areas with brown algae. This species has also been recorded among turf-like growths of the alga Gelidium latifolium, it associates with the sea urchins Paracentrotus lividus and Sphaerechinus granularis, and then among boulders. As it goes through its different life stages it moves through these habitats. It has also been found in the hollow bulbs of the seaweed Saccorhiza polyschides. The pelagic stage of its larvae are able to survive for around two weeks in open water. They are associated with the holdfasts of kelp.
