= Paracentrotus lividus =

Scientific classification
- Kingdom: Animalia
- Phylum: Echinodermata
- Class: Echinoidea
- Order: Camarodonta
- Family: Parechinidae
- Genus: Paracentrotus
- Species: P. lividus

Binomial name
- Paracentrotus lividus (Lamarck, 1816)

Synonyms
- Echinus (Toxopneustes) lividus (Lamarck, 1816); Echinus lithophagus Leach, in Tilloch, 1812; Echinus lividus (Lamarck, 1816); Echinus purpureus Risso, 1826; Echinus vulgaris Blainville, 1825; Euryechinus lividus (Lamarck, 1816); Microcordyla asteriae Zirpolo, 1927; Microcordyla asteriae Pascale la Cascia, 1930; Paracentrotus (Strongylocentrotus) lividus (Lamarck, 1816); Strongylocentrotus lividus (Lamarck, 1816); Toxocidaris livida (Lamarck, 1816); Toxopneustes complanatus L. Agassiz & Desor, 1846; Toxopneustes concavus L. Agassiz & Desor, 1846; Toxopneustes lividus (Lamarck, 1816)

Species of sea urchin

Paracentrotus lividus is a species of sea urchin in the family Parechinidae commonly known as the purple sea urchin. It is the type species of the genus and occurs in the Mediterranean Sea and eastern Atlantic Ocean.

== Description ==
Paracentrotus lividus has a circular, flattened greenish test with a diameter of up to seven centimetres. The test is densely clothed in long and sharply pointed spines that are usually purple but are occasionally other colours including dark brown, light brown and olive green. There are five or six pairs of pores on each ambulacral plate. The tube feet are in groups of 5 or 6, arranged in small arcs.

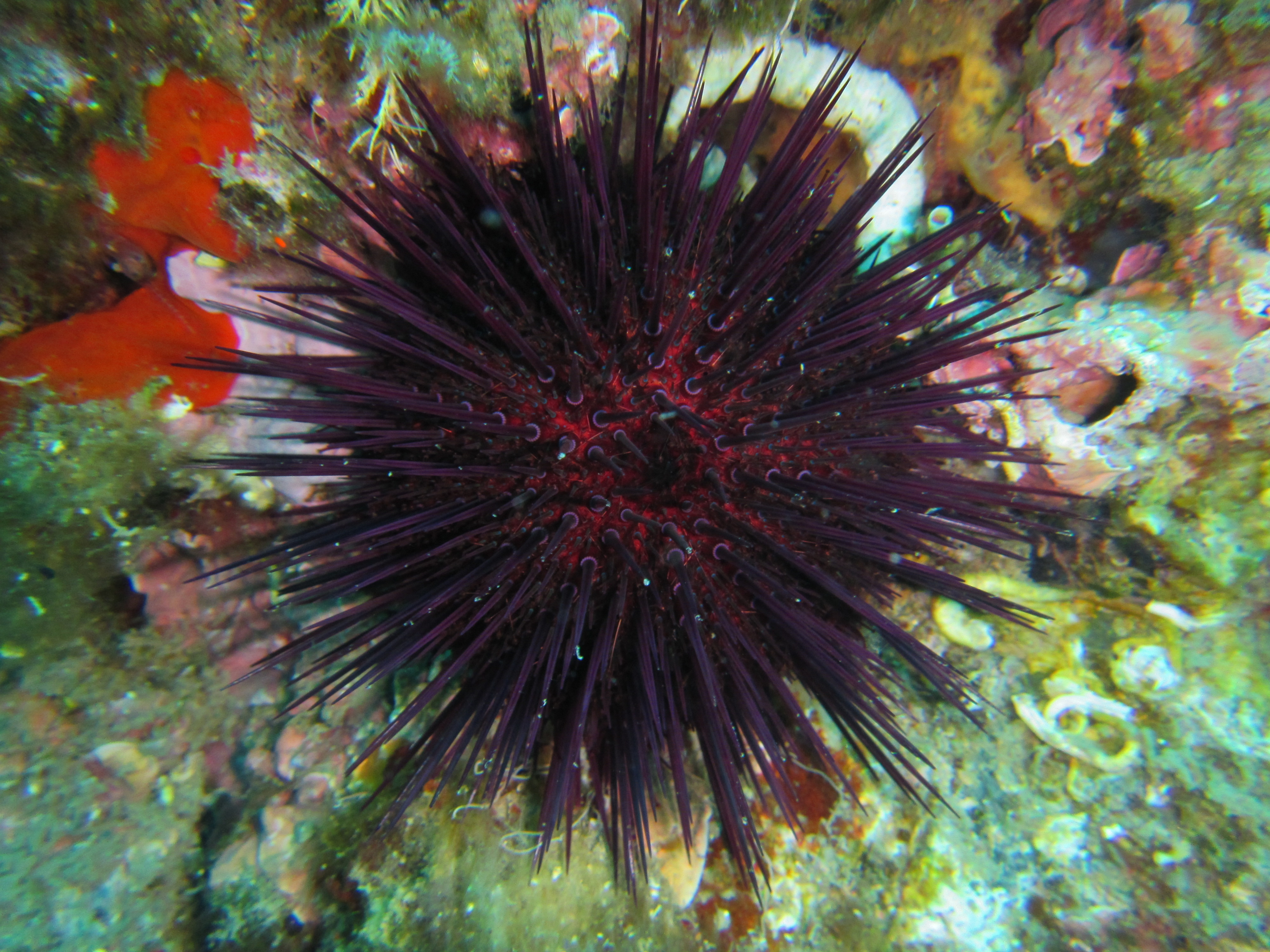
Aboral side

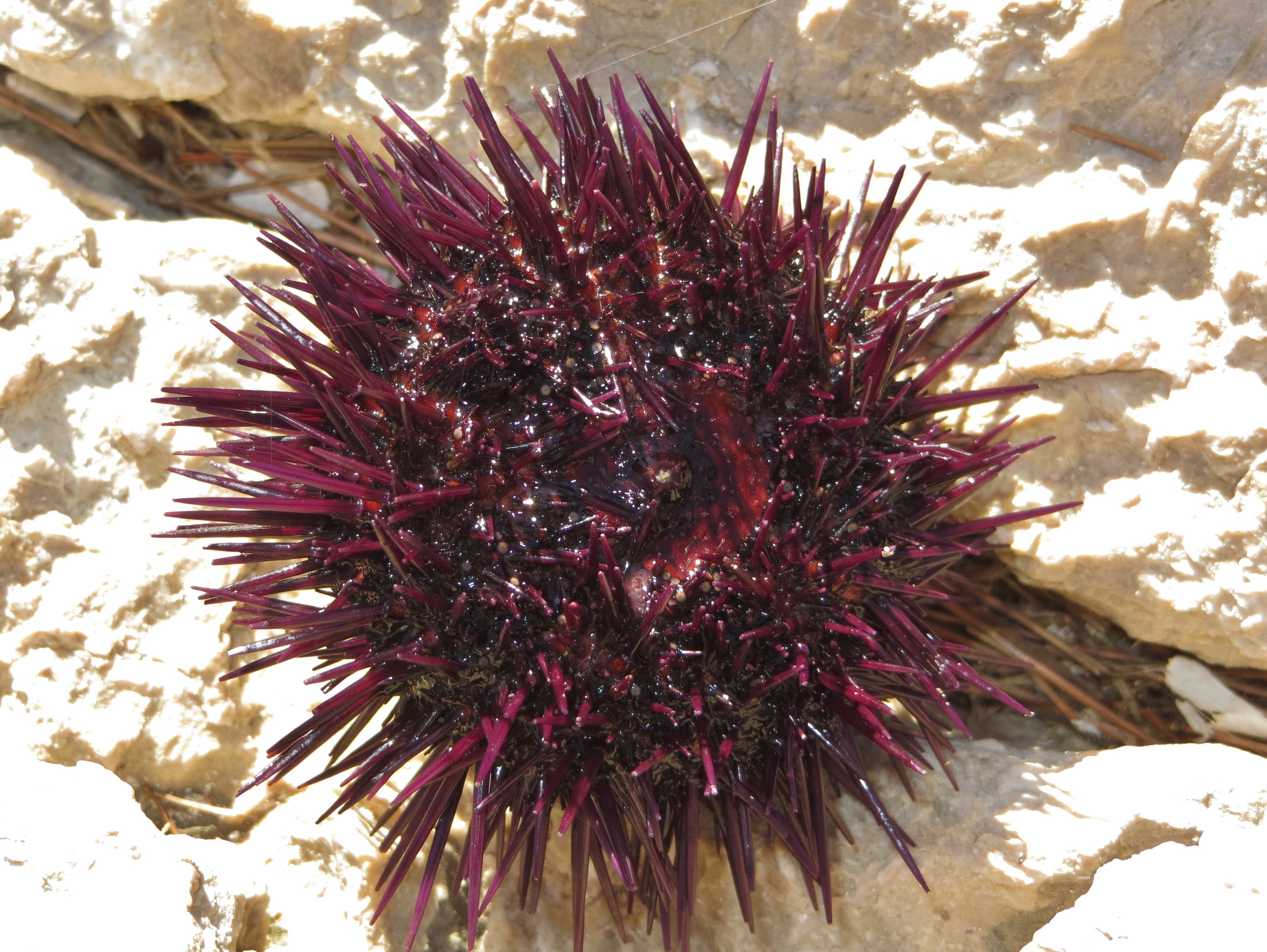
Oral side (underside, with the mouth at the center)

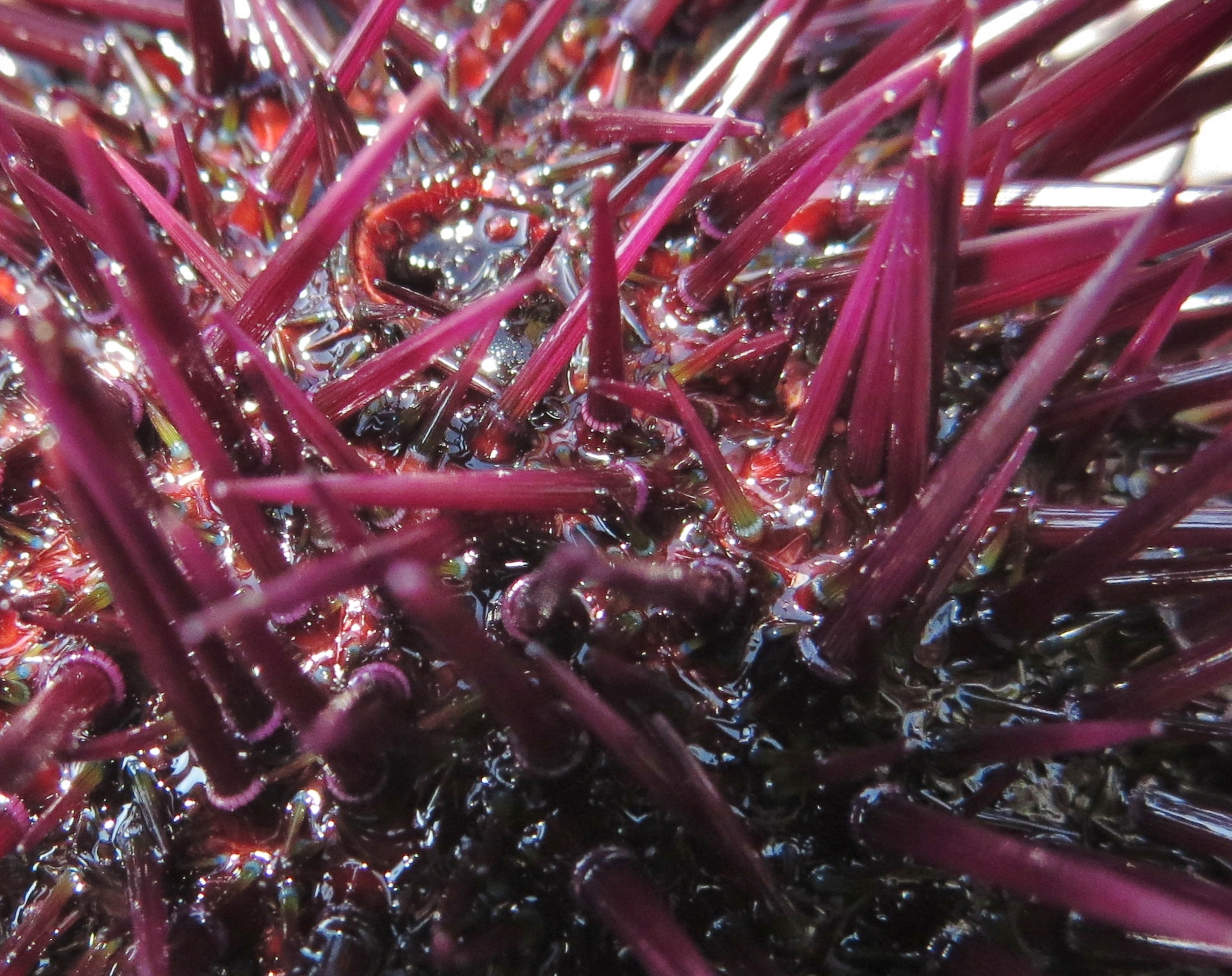
Close-up on the spines, showing a lighter circle at the root

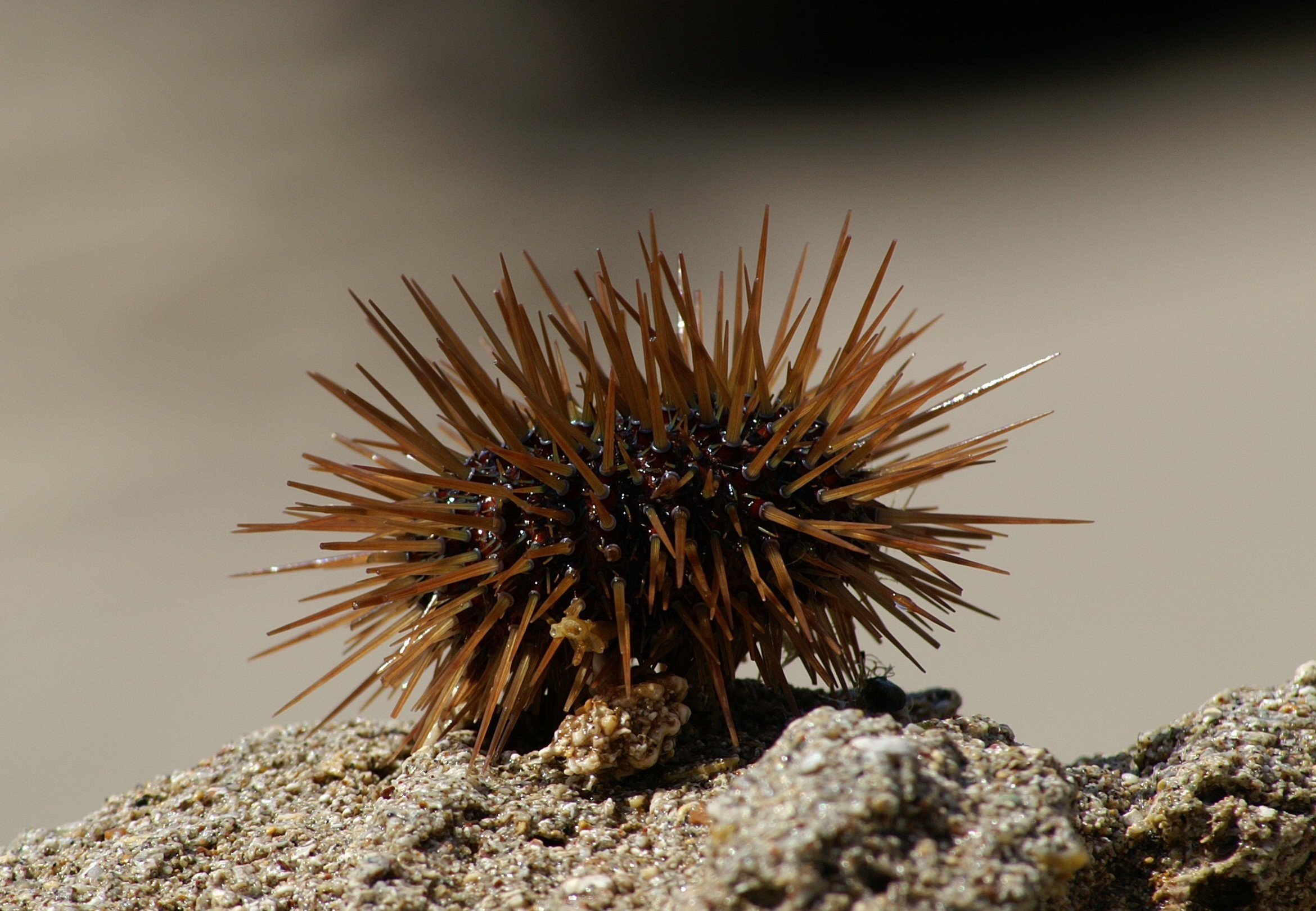
Brown young

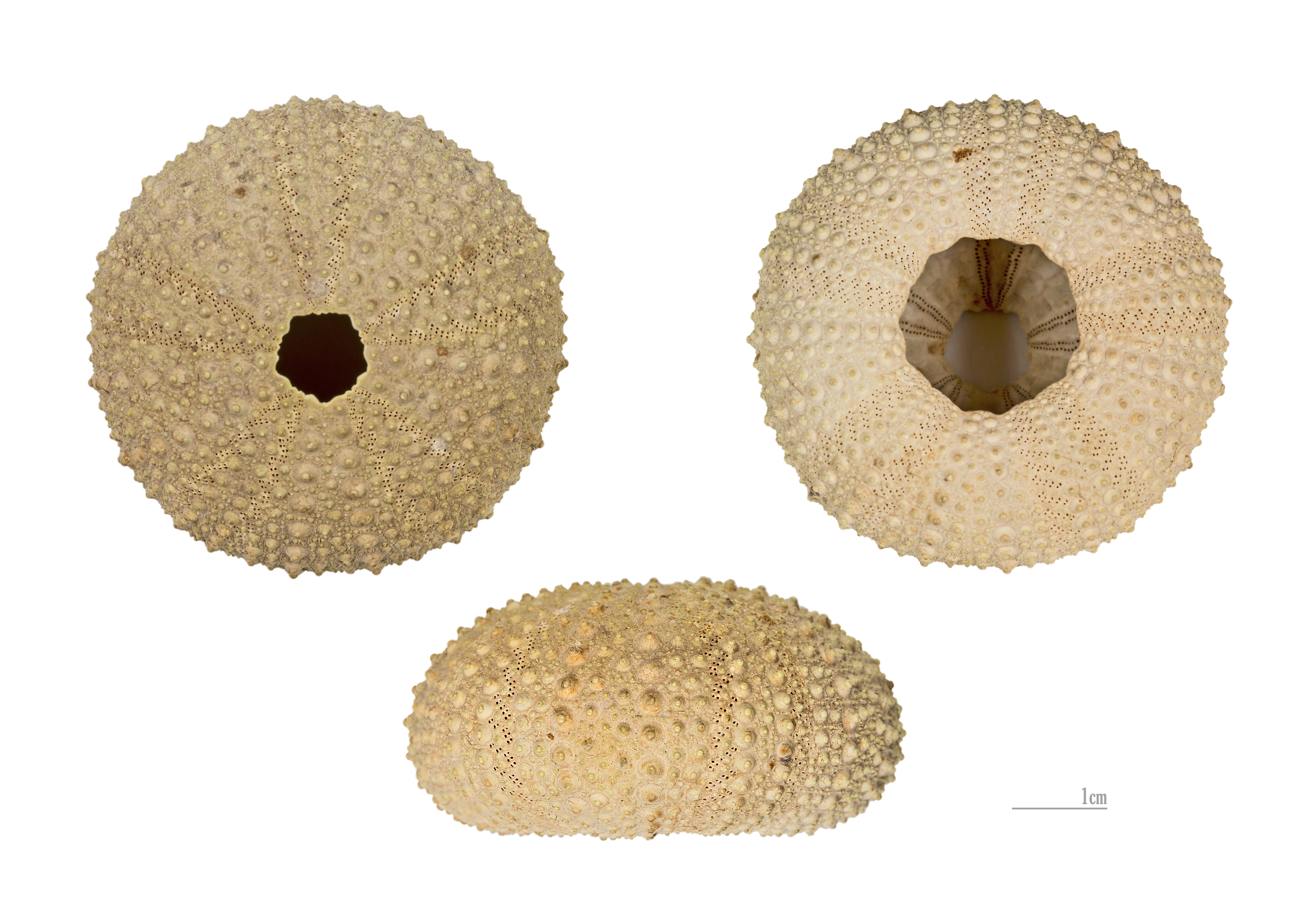
Test

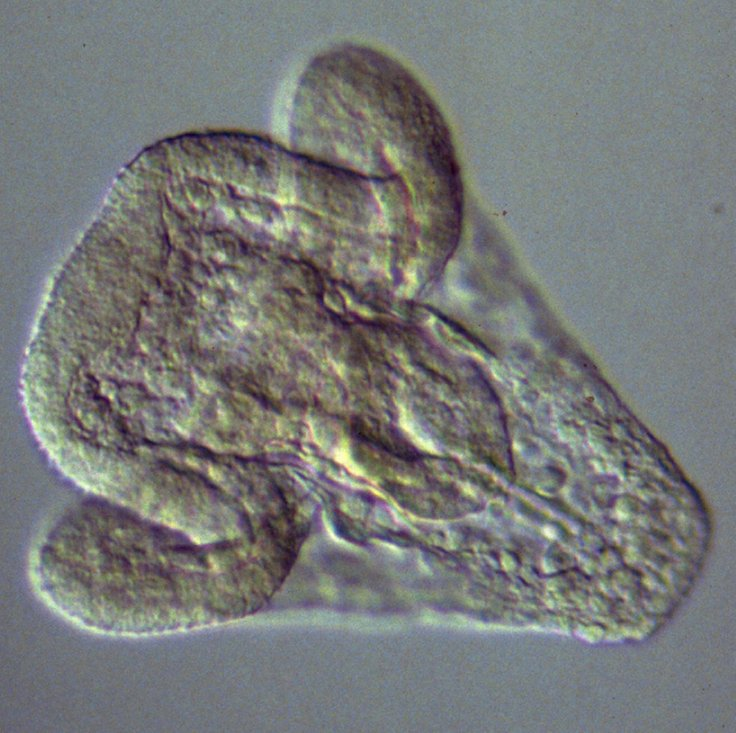
P. lividus at an early embryonic stage.

== Distribution ==
Paracentrotus lividus is found throughout the Mediterranean Sea and in the eastern Atlantic Ocean from western Scotland and Ireland to the Azores, Canary Islands and Morocco. It is most common in the western Mediterranean, the coasts of Portugal and the Bay of Biscay, where the water temperature in winter varies between 10 and 15 °C.

== Habitat ==
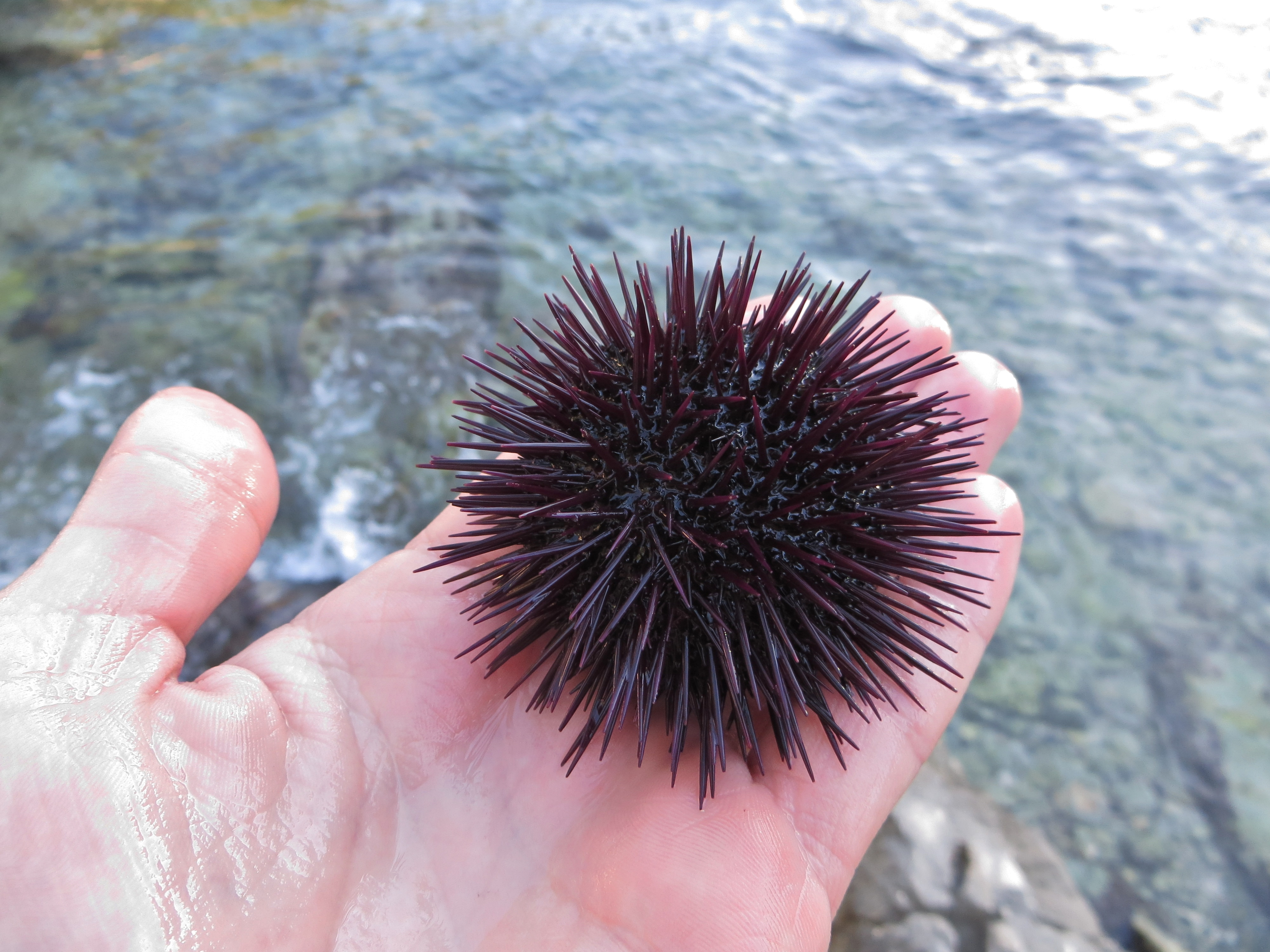
The purple sea urchin is spiny but not dangerous, and it can be held in hand with some care.

Paracentrotus lividus is usually found just below low water mark at depths down to twenty metres and sometimes also in rock pools. It is found on rocks and boulders, and in seagrass meadows of Zostera marina and Posidonia oceanica. Although Cymodocea nodosa is a preferred food item, it is seldom found in meadows of this seagrass, perhaps because the shifting sand substrate does not suit it or because of pressure from predators. In fact it avoids soft substrates and can sometimes be found clustered on stones or shell "islands" surrounded by sand. In shallow or exposed waters it can use its mouth and spines to dig into soft rocks to create cavities into which it returns and in which it exactly fits. Where the urchins are numerous, the rock may be honeycombed by these excavations. Smaller individuals particularly use these retreats, which provide some protection from predators. In lagoons and rock pools, individuals are smaller than they are in the open sea. P. lividus is unable to tolerate low salinity. After exceptional quantities of rain fell in Corsica in the autumn of 1993, there was mass mortality of urchins in the Urbini Lagoon. However, the urchin is relatively unaffected by organic pollution and heavy metals. In fact, it flourishes near sewage outlets. There are wide swings in population densities over its range, which have not been completely explained.

== Biology ==
Individual P. lividus are either male or female although hermaphroditism has been observed. They aggregate for spawning and release gametes into the water column. The larvae form part of the zooplankton for about 28 days before settling and undergoing metamorphosis.

== Ecology ==
Paracentrotus lividus is a generalist browser, eating a range of red, green and brown algae in addition to seagrass. The benthic community is much affected by the number of urchins and their food preferences. Where they are numerous they tend to be surrounded by "barren ground" colonised by encrusting Corallinaceae species and characterised by a low biomass of primary producers with a small number of associated species. Where numbers are low, there tend to be forests of Laminaria and Cystoseira and a much richer, three-dimensional community. The barren grounds can persist for years though whether this is due to overgrazing by urchins or prevention of recruitment of multicellular photosynthetic organisms by encrusting algae is unclear.

Some juveniles of small fish species shelter among the spines. These include the clingfishes Apletodon incognitus and Lepadogaster candolii and the gobies, Gobius bucchichi, Zebrus zebrus and Millerigobius macrocephalus.

The main predators on P. lividus in the Mediterranean Sea are the spider crab (Maja crispata), the fish Diplodus sargus, Diplodus vulgaris, Labrus merula and Coris julis and the gastropod, Hexaplex trunculus. The spiny starfish (Marthasterias glacialis) is a main predator elsewhere. Predation is dependent on size; juvenile urchins are more vulnerable as their spines are less formidable. In most locations the urchins are nocturnal feeders, but where predators are more active at night the urchins may feed during day instead.

== Use as food ==
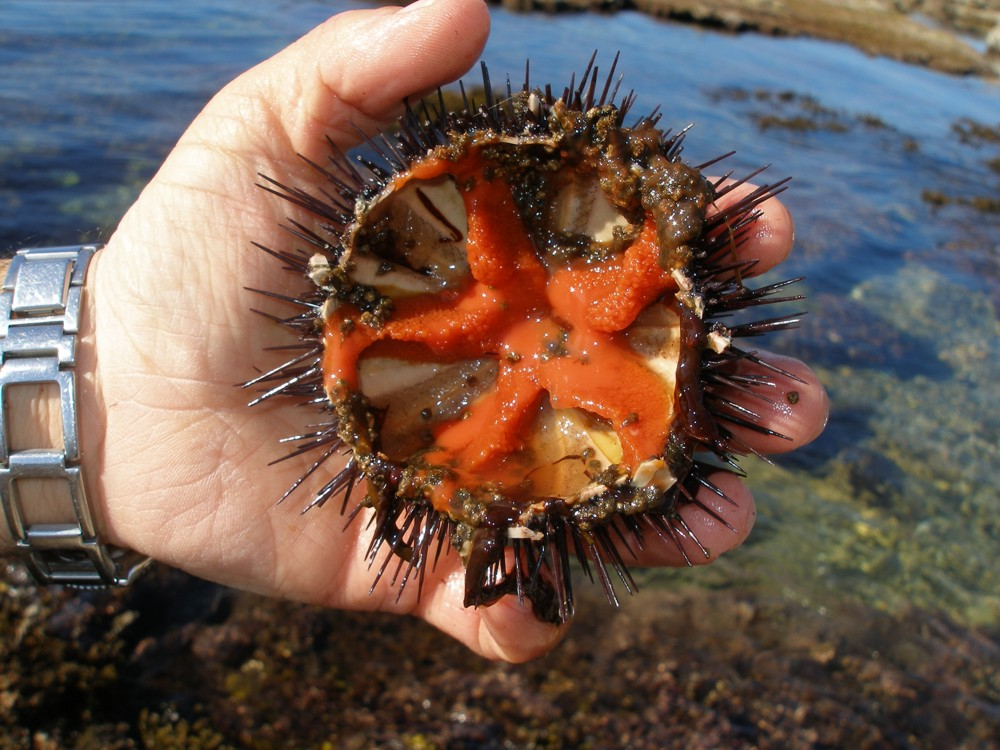
P. lividus roe

Archaeological evidence shows human consumption of purple sea urchins as far back as the Mousterian period of European Middle Paleolithic, where urchin remains have been in found as part of Neanderthal strata of Gibraltar's Gorham's Cave complex.

The gonads are considered a delicacy in Lebanon, France, Italy, Spain, Malta, and parts of Croatia, most notably on the island of Korčula, and are also eaten to a lesser extent in Greece and Tunisia. The urchins have been harvested for export over a wider area including Croatia, Portugal and Ireland. Additionally, sea urchin meat has been popularised in modern cuisine as "Uni", with Paracentrotus lividus being known as "Murasaki Uni". It is primarily harvested in Hokkaido, Japan alongside its counterpart "Bafun Uni".
