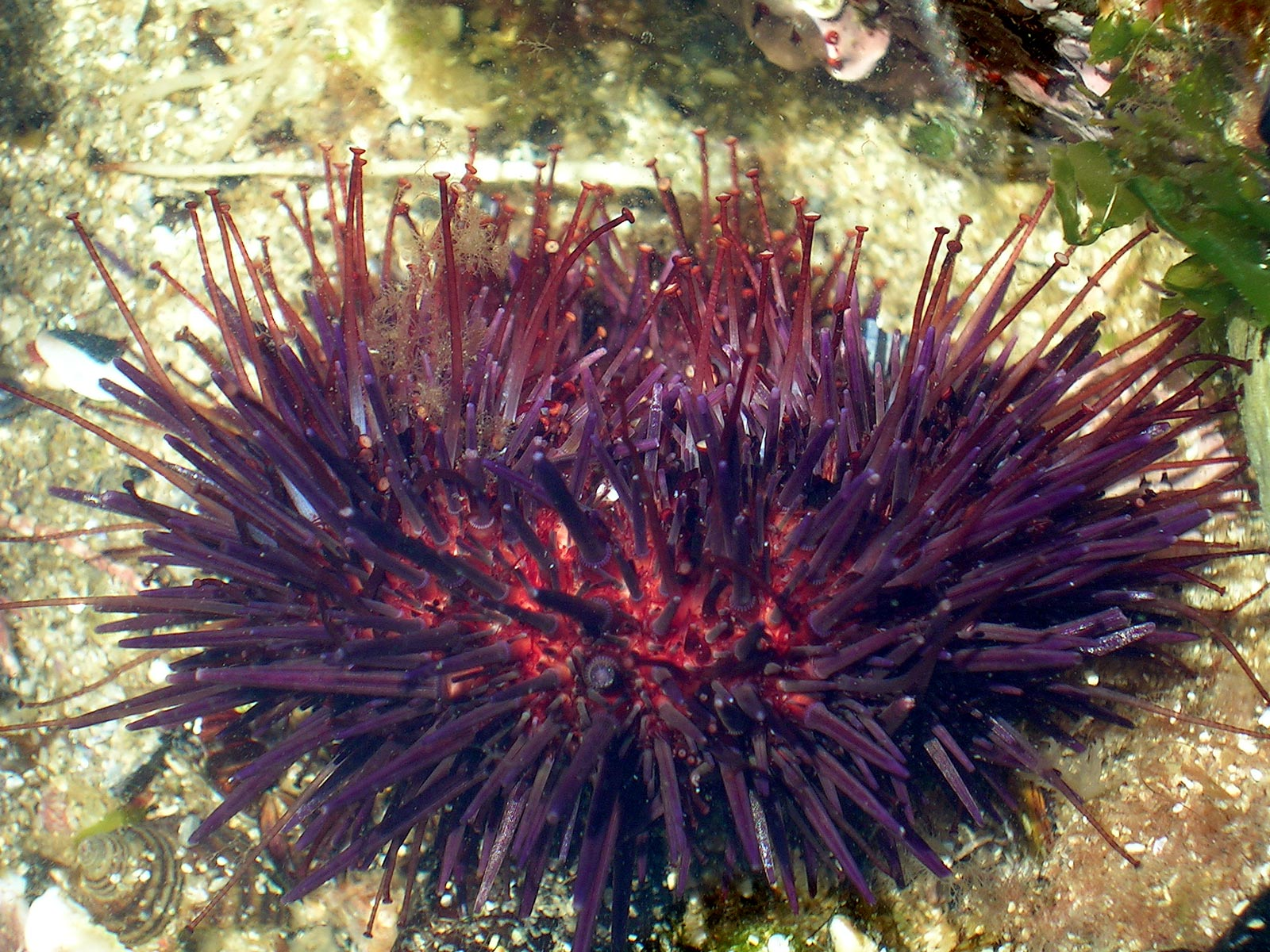

Scientific classification
- Kingdom: Animalia
- Phylum: Echinodermata
- Class: Echinoidea
- Order: Camarodonta
- Family: Parechinidae
- Genus: Paracentrotus; Mortensen, 1903

Type species
- Paracentrotus lividus

= Paracentrotus =

Genus of sea urchins

Paracentrotus is a genus of sea urchin in the family Parechinidae described in 1903 by Mortensen.

== List of Species ==
| Image | Scientific name | Distribution |
|---|---|---|
| | Paracentrotus gaimardi (Blainville, 1825) | southeast Brazil |
| | Paracentrotus lividus (Lamarck, 1816) (purple sea urchin) | Mediterranean Sea and eastern Atlantic Ocean. |
| | Paracentrotus lividus | Mombasa-Kenya |
