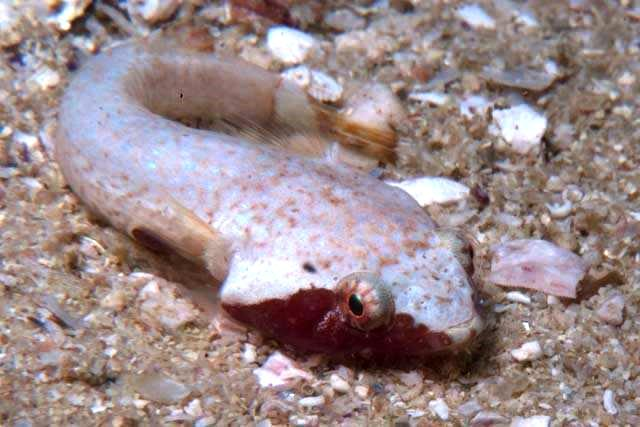

Scientific classification
- Domain: Eukaryota
- Kingdom: Animalia
- Phylum: Chordata
- Class: Actinopterygii
- Order: Blenniiformes
- Family: Gobiesocidae
- Genus: Apletodon
- Species: A. pellegrini

Binomial name
- Apletodon pellegrini (Chabanaud, 1925)

Synonyms
- Lepadogaster pellegrini Chabanaud, 1925; Apletodon knysnaensis Smith, 1964

= Apletodon pellegrini =

Species of fish

Apletodon pellegrini, the chubby clingfish, is a species of clingfish of the family Gobiesocidae. The species is found in the Eastern Atlantic, from Madeira, Cape Verde, Canary Islands, Annobon Islands, mainland shore from Cape Blanco south to Port Alfred, South Africa.

== Description ==
The chubby clingfish reaches a length of 5.0 cm (2.0 in). It is short with a fat triangular head that tapers to a narrow tail. It ranges from nearly white to pink to dark maroon in colour and may have dark (if mostly pale) or light (if mostly dark) blotches covering its skin. These blotches are not present in all individuals. The pelvic fins are modified to form sucker, which the fish uses to attach itself to smooth, flat surfaces. The anus is surrounded by papillae. It usually has a pale line between the eyes. This may form a triangle in some specimens. It has large but rounded incisor-like teeth on both jaws at the front of the mouth, particularly in dult males.

== Ecology ==
=== Behaviour ===
This fish has a distinctive J-shaped form when resting, with the tail curled towards the head. They will often attach themselves to the insides of flat shells on the sea floor.

=== Reproduction ===
Females lay eggs inside shells at various times during the year. She guards the shell and the transparent eggs inside. After they hatch, small round marks can be seen on the shell to which the eggs were attached. The juveniles hide themselves while they grow and mid-sized fish can be found a couple of weeks later.

== Etymology ==
The cling fish is named in honor of French ichthyologist Jacques Pellegrin (1873-1944).
