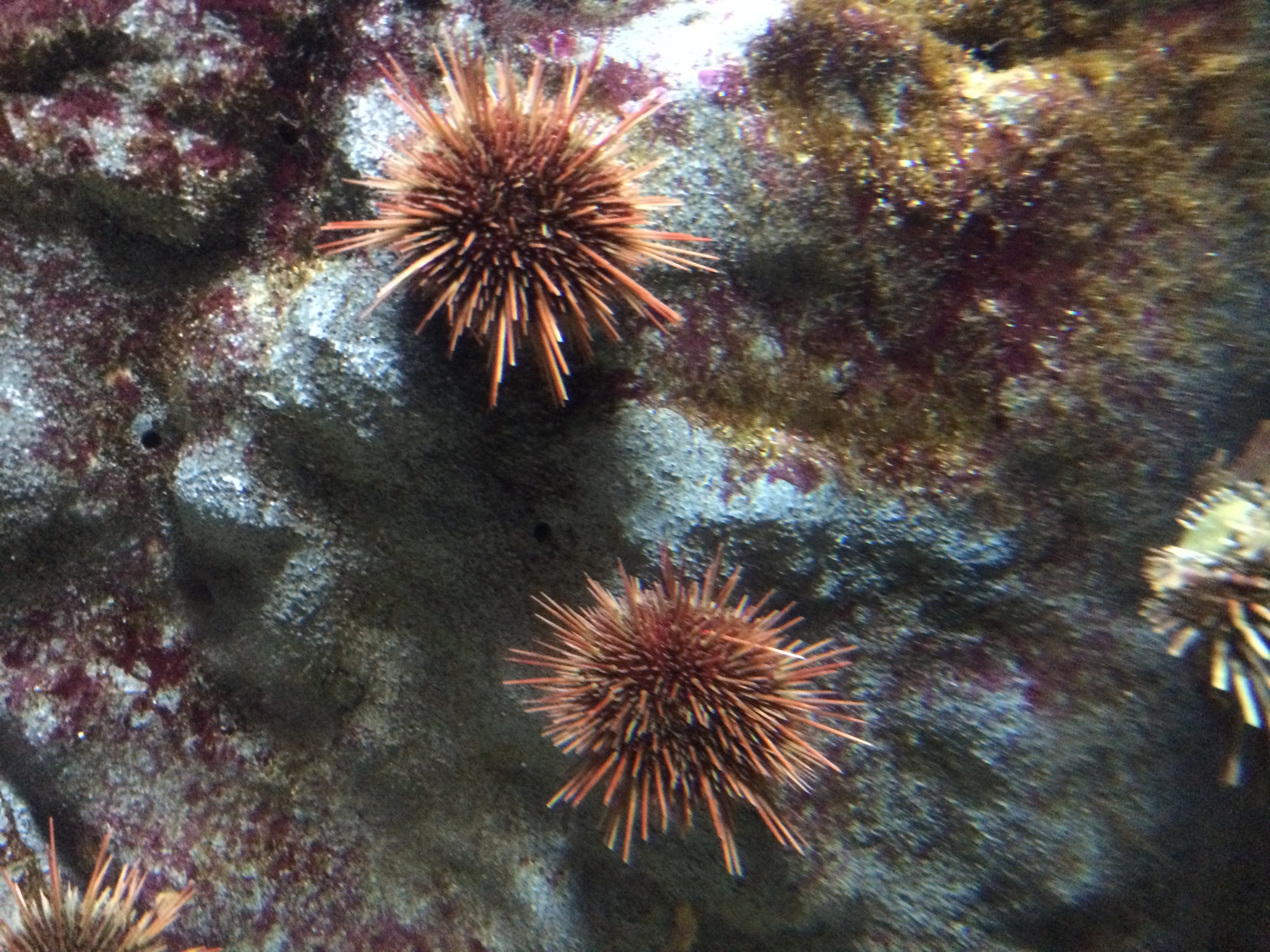
- Two Loxechinus albus

Scientific classification
- Kingdom: Animalia
- Phylum: Echinodermata
- Class: Echinoidea
- Order: Camarodonta
- Family: Parechinidae
- Genus: Loxechinus; Desor, 1856
- Species: L. albus

Binomial name
- Loxechinus albus Molina, 1782

= Loxechinus =

Species of sea urchin

Loxechinus albus is an echinoderm of the family Parechinidae, native to coastal southern South America, ranging from Ecuador, along the entire coasts of Peru and Chile, to Argentina, as well as the Falkland Islands. It is the only species in the genus Loxechinus. It is known as the Chilean sea urchin or red sea urchin, but the latter name is typically used for the North Pacific Mesocentrotus franciscanus and it is not the only species of sea urchin in Chile (although it is the most common and widespread large sea urchins in that country). L. albus is found on rocky reefs and shores in the intertidal and subtidal zones to a depth of 340 m (1,120 ft).

== Description ==
Loxechinus albus is a fast-growing, relatively large sea urchin with a test diameter of up to 11 cm (4.3 in), although the far southernmost populations tend to grow slower and reach a smaller size. The test is dorsoventrally flattened and densely covered in small spines. Living individuals of this urchin typically appear overall dull reddish with some pale green to the spines, but its color is variable, and some large specimens have been found in deeper waters which are white. There are 6 to 11 ambulacral plates each bearing a single short primary spine and many longer secondaries. The globiferous pedicellariae have a neck between the stem and head, large valves and several lateral teeth.

== Biology ==
Loxechinus albus is mostly found on rocky coasts associated with the kelp Macrocystis pyrifera. It is more numerous in exposed locations. It is a herbivore and seems to feed on whatever species of alga grow nearby. Juveniles feed on crustose coralline algae, diatoms and algal detritus. In the Northern Hemisphere, some urchin species have large population swings and may create "barren ground" around them. In contrast, L. albus seems to be in balance with its food supply and does not seem to be limited by the quantity of algae available nor does the kelp growth become excessive. This may be partly because it also feeds on drifting algal fragments which are always abundant in kelp beds.

The spawning period varies along the Chilean coast. Spawning period occurs later in the year as latitude increases; at 23° S it occurs in June, at 45° S (Chiloé) it occurs in November–December. The populations inhabiting the Magellan Region (53° S) are an exception since their spawning period lasts from July to September.

The echinopluteus larvae form part of the zooplankton for about thirty days, feeding on phytoplankton. They settle in the rocky intertidal zone and undergo metamorphosis, living in cracks in the rocks as juveniles before migrating to the neritic zone where they mostly feed on drift algae and fronds of kelp.

== Uses ==
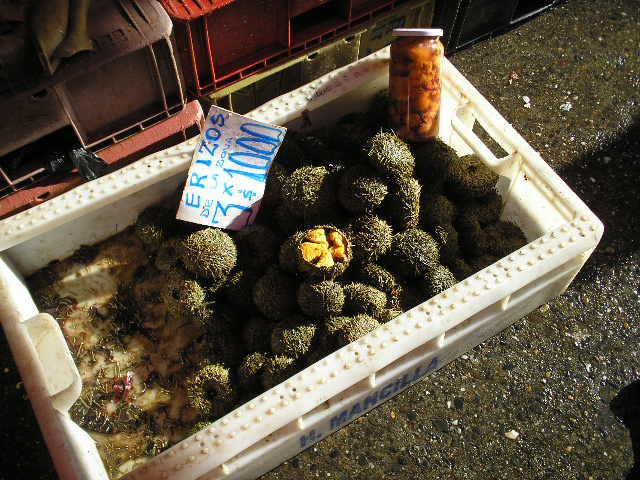
Chilean sea urchins for sale in Feria fluvial, Valdivia. Three sea urchins are sold for 1000 Chilean Pesos.

Known locally in Chile as the 'Erizo rojo' (red urchin), it is harvested commercially by fishermen and is an ingredient in Chilean cuisine. Over-exploitation, its conspicuousness and lack of official harvest control means that this urchin is relatively rare in some parts of its range. It takes 8 years to reach harvestable size.
