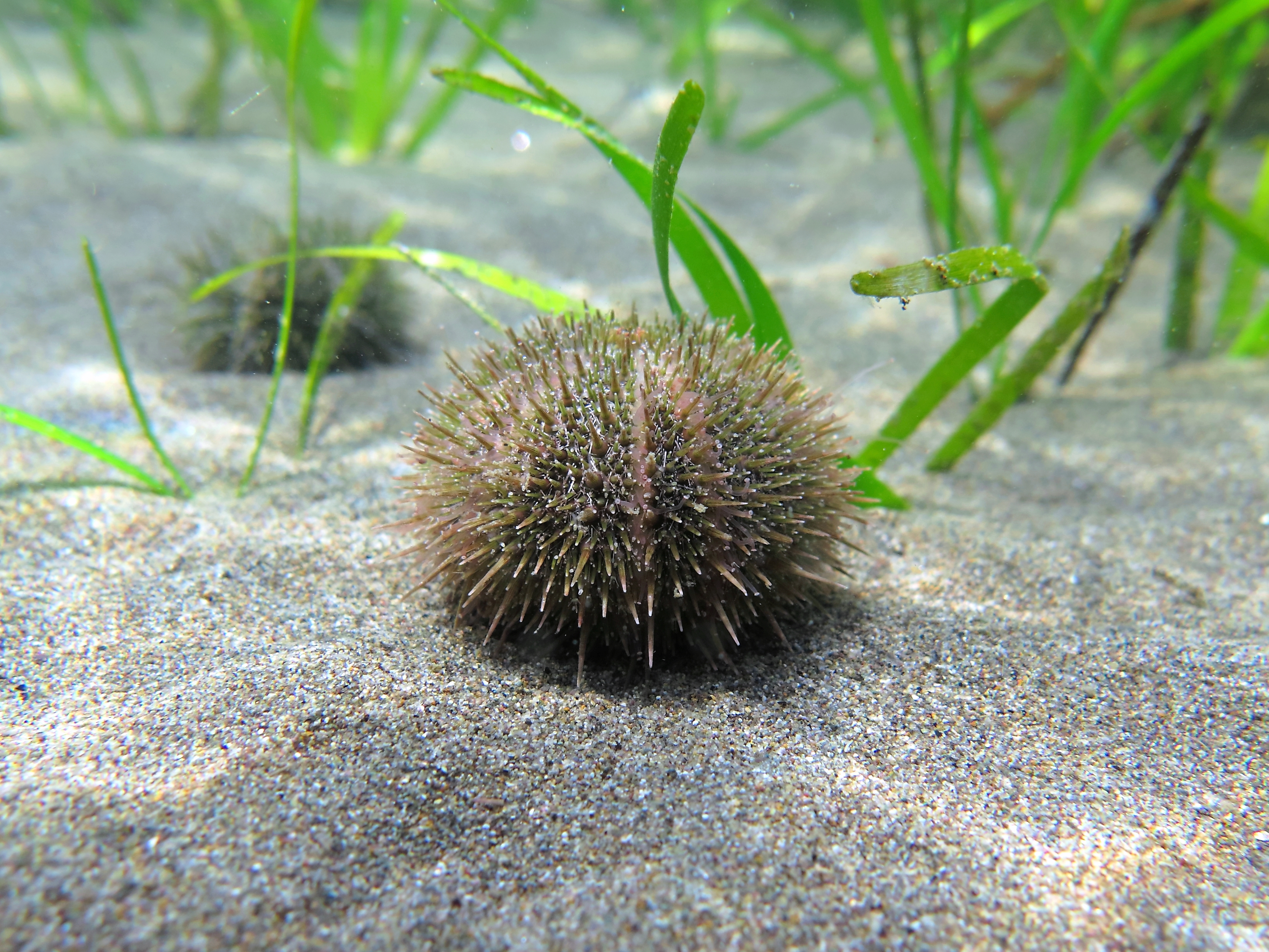
- Psammechinus microtuberculatus

Scientific classification
- Kingdom: Animalia
- Phylum: Echinodermata
- Class: Echinoidea
- Order: Camarodonta
- Family: Parechinidae
- Genus: Psammechinus; L. Agassiz & Desor, 1846

= Psammechinus =

Genus of sea urchins

Psammechinus is a genus of sea urchins in the family Parechinidae containing two species:

Image	Scientific name	Distribution
	Psammechinus microtuberculatus (Blainville, 1825)	western and eastern Atlantic Ocean, the Adriatic Sea and Aegean Sea
	Psammechinus miliaris (P.L.S. Müller, 1771)	eastern Atlantic Ocean from Scandinavia south to Morocco, but not in the Mediterranean Sea
