= Apletodon bacescui =

Conservation status
- Least Concern (IUCN 3.1)

Scientific classification
- Kingdom: Animalia
- Phylum: Chordata
- Class: Actinopterygii
- Order: Blenniiformes
- Family: Gobiesocidae
- Genus: Apletodon
- Species: A. bacescui

Binomial name
- Apletodon bacescui (Murgoci, 1940)

Synonyms
- Lepadogaster bacescui Murgoci, 1940

Species of fish

Apletodon bacescui is a species of clingfish of the family Gobiesocidae. The species is endemic to the Black Sea, where it is found in the south western part of the sea off Romania and Bulgaria, along the northern coast of Anatolia to central Turkey. This species was described by Adriana Antoniu-Murgoci in 1940 from specimens collected by zoologist Mihai C. Bacescu (1908-1999) of the Grigore Antipa National Museum of Natural History in Bucharest while he was dredging in the Black Sea.
