= São Tomé clingfish =

Conservation status
- Least Concern (IUCN 3.1)

Scientific classification
- Kingdom: Animalia
- Phylum: Chordata
- Class: Actinopterygii
- Order: Blenniiformes
- Family: Gobiesocidae
- Genus: Apletodon
- Species: A. wirtzi

Binomial name
- Apletodon wirtzi Fricke, 2007

Species of fish

The São Tomé clingfish (Apletodon wirtzi) is a species of marine fish of the family Gobiesocidae (clingfish). It grows to 1.4 cm maximal length. It occurs in the eastern Atlantic Ocean, around the islands of São Tomé and Príncipe between 0 and 3 metres depth. The species was first described in 2007 by Ronald Fricke, its specific name honouring the collector of the type, marine biologist Peter Wirtz of Madeira.
