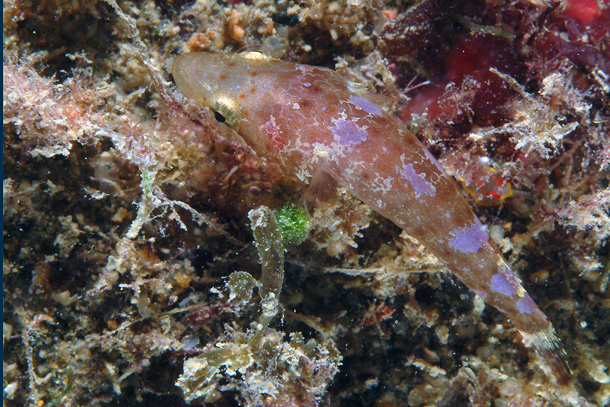
- A. incognitus

Scientific classification
- Domain: Eukaryota
- Kingdom: Animalia
- Phylum: Chordata
- Class: Actinopterygii
- Order: Blenniiformes
- Family: Gobiesocidae
- Subfamily: Gobiesocinae
- Genus: Apletodon; Briggs, 1955

Type species
- Lepadogaster microcephalus Brook, 1890

= Apletodon =

Genus of fishes

Apletodon is a genus of marine fish in the family Gobiesocidae (clingfishes). The genus was first named by John Carmon Briggs in 1955.

== Species ==
There are currently six recognized species in this genus:

- Apletodon bacescui (Murgoci, 1940)
- Apletodon barbatus R. Fricke, Wirtz & Brito, 2010 (Barbel clingfish)
- Apletodon dentatus (Facciolà, 1887) (Small-headed clingfish)
- Apletodon incognitus Hofrichter (de) & Patzner, 1997
- Apletodon pellegrini (Chabanaud, 1925) (Chubby clingfish)
- Apletodon wirtzi R. Fricke, 2007 (São Tomé clingfish)
