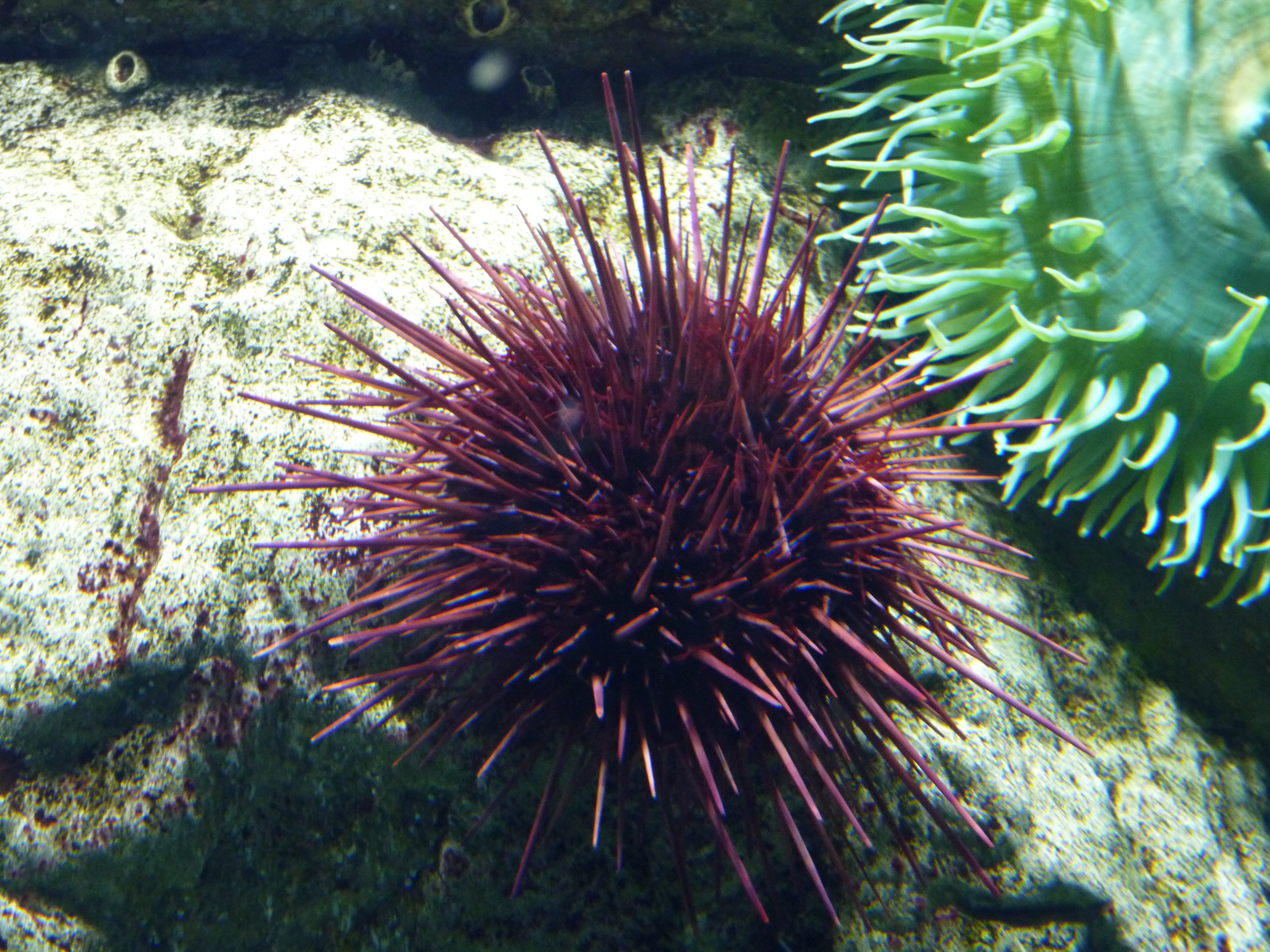
- Paracentrotus lividus

Scientific classification
- Kingdom: Animalia
- Phylum: Echinodermata
- Class: Echinoidea
- Order: Camarodonta
- Infraorder: Echinidea
- Family: Parechinidae; Mortensen, 1903b

Genera
- See text

= Parechinidae =

Family of sea urchins

The Parechinidae are a family of sea urchins in the class Echinoidea.

== Characteristics ==
All camarodonts have imperforate tubercles and compound ambulacral plates. In addition, the characteristics of the parechinids include the interambulacral plates being densely covered with tubercles with many subequal tubercles, and the buccal notches being insignificant in size. The globiferous pedicellariae between the spines have widely open blades each with many lateral teeth.

== Genera ==
| Image | Genus | Species |
|---|---|---|
| | Loxechinus Desor, 1856 | Loxechinus albus |
| | Paracentrotus Mortensen, 1903b | Paracentrotus gaimardi (Blainville, 1825); Paracentrotus lividus (Lamarck, 1816) |
| | Parechinus Mortensen, 1903b | Parechinus angulosus |
| | Psammechinus L. Agassiz & Desor, 1846 | Psammechinus microtuberculatus (Blainville, 1825); Psammechinus miliaris (P.L.S. Müller, 1771) |

=== Fossils ===
- †Isechinus Lambert, 1903
