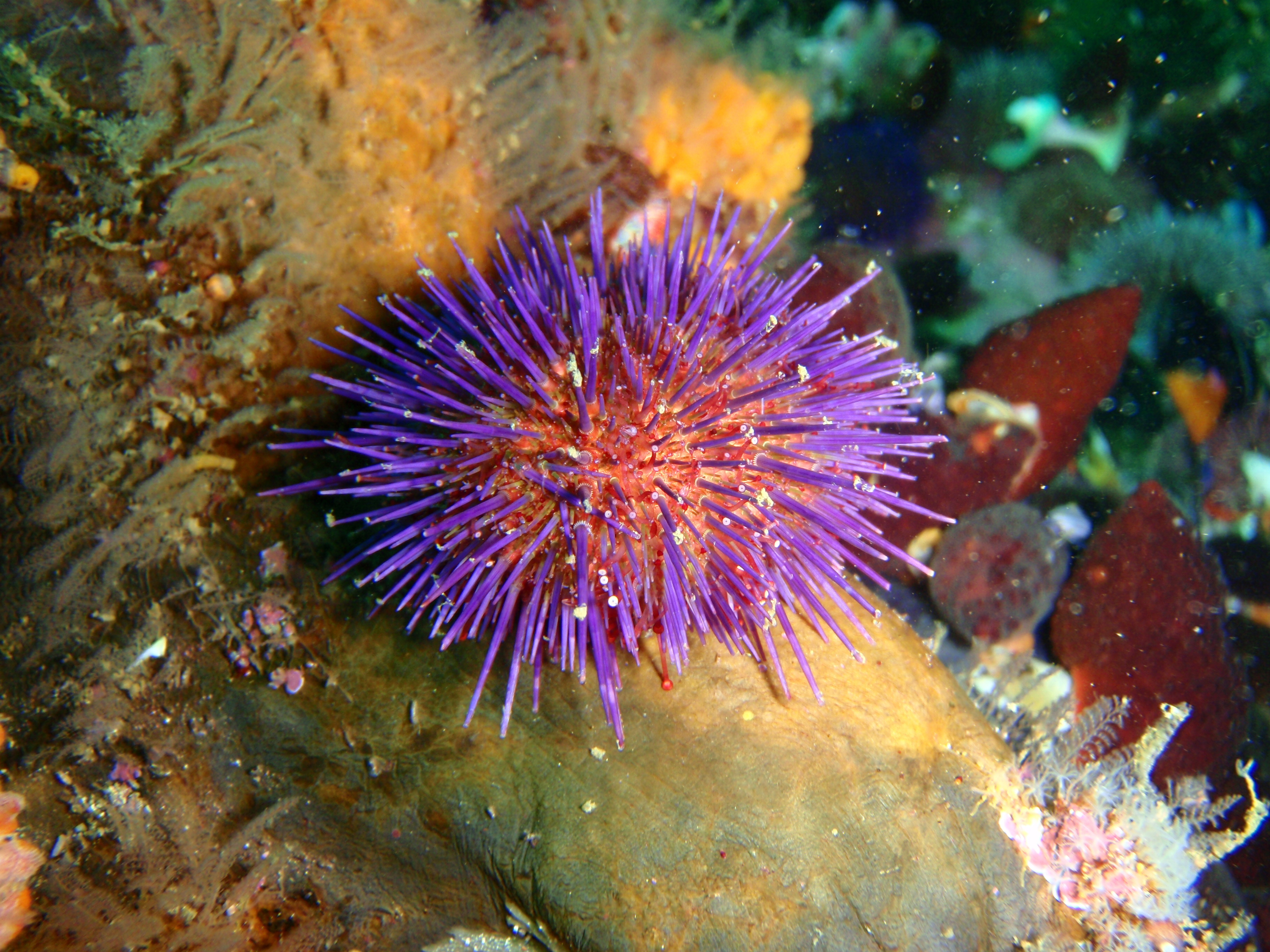
- Cape urchin at Partridge Point

Scientific classification
- Kingdom: Animalia
- Phylum: Echinodermata
- Class: Echinoidea
- Order: Camarodonta
- Family: Parechinidae
- Genus: Parechinus; Mortensen, 1903
- Species: P. angulosus

Binomial name
- Parechinus angulosus (Leske, 1778)

= Parechinus =

Sea urchin endemic to southern Africa

Parechinus angulosus, the Cape urchin, is a sea urchin in the family Parechinidae endemic to southern Africa. It is the only species in the genus Parechinus.

== Synonyms ==
- Cidaris angulosus Leske, 1778
- Cidaris angulosus minor Leske, 1778
- Echinus angulosus minor (Leske, 1778)
- Echinus minimus Blainville, 1825
- Echinus subangulosus Lamarck, 1816
- Parechinus angulosus pallidus H.L. Clark
- Parechinus annulatus (Mortensen, 1909)
- Protocentrotus angulosus (Leske, 1778)
- Protocentrotus annulatus Mortensen, 1909
- Psammechinus subangulosus (Lamarck, 1816)

== Description ==
The test is round, diameter up to 60 mm, with a dense covering of short sharp spines which do not exceed 20% of test diameter. The test colour is usually green, spines purple, but also green, red or off-white.

== Distribution ==
Lüderitz to Durban, intertidal to about 100 m.

== Natural history ==
Grazes on seaweeds, and population density affects the rate of kelp settlement. Provides shelter for juvenile abalone Haliotis midae and is an important influence on kelp forest ecology. Abundant on flatter areas of rocky reefs in the Cape. Eaten by West coast rock lobster Jasus lalandii.

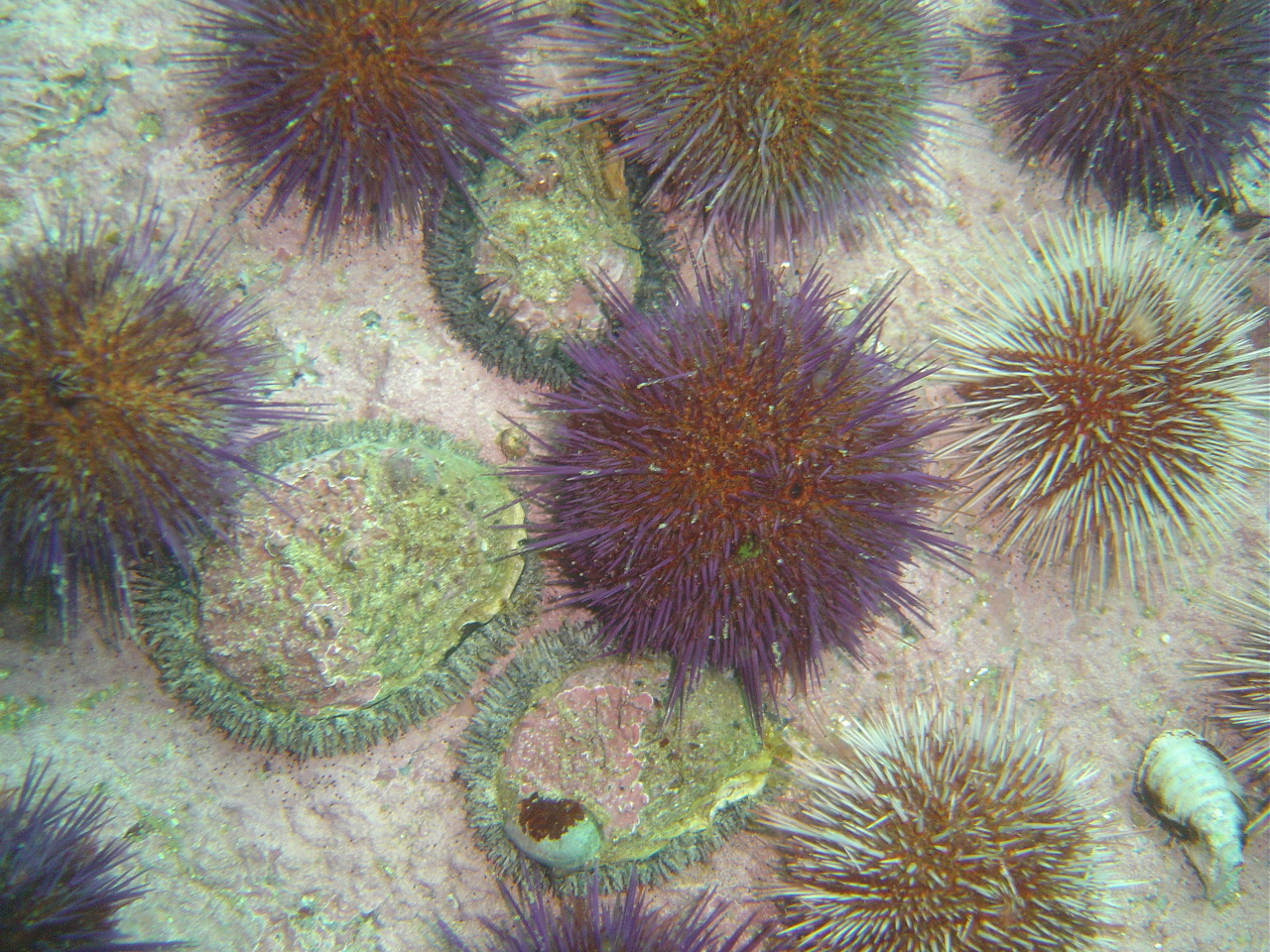
Juvenile abalone and Urchins at A-Frame

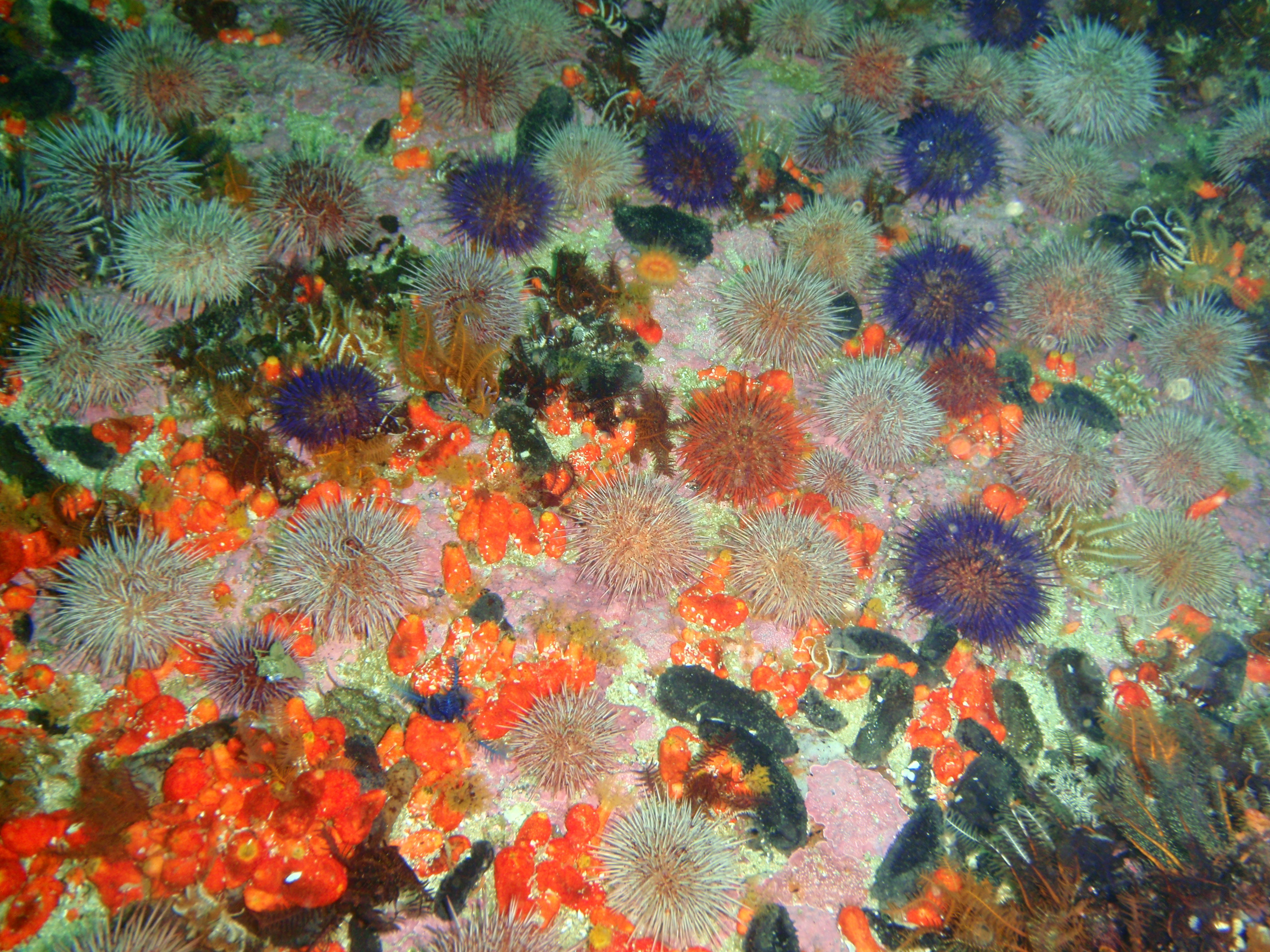
Sea urchins and red cucumbers at Outer Castle

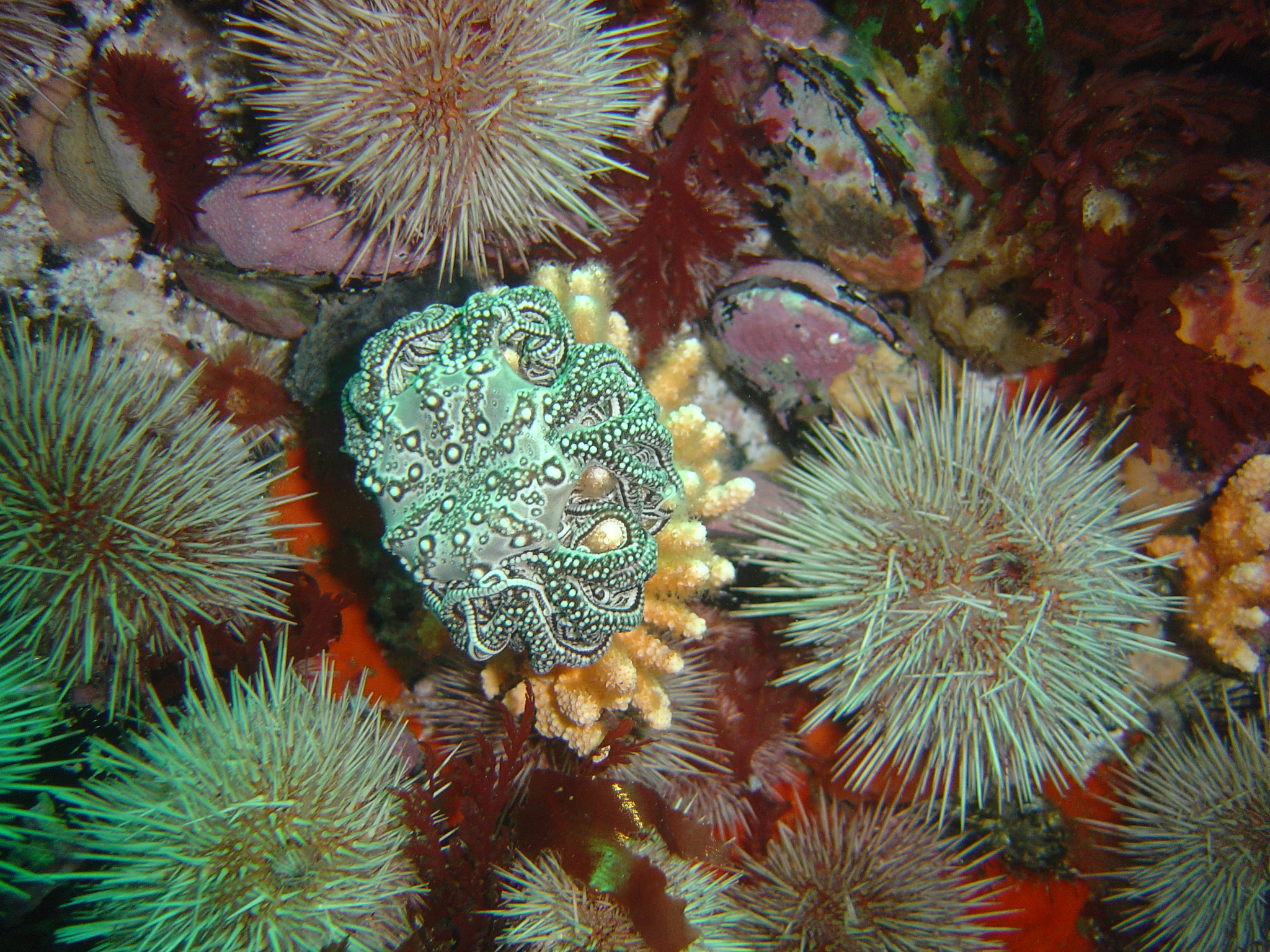
Small basket star and sea urchins at Kanobi's Reef

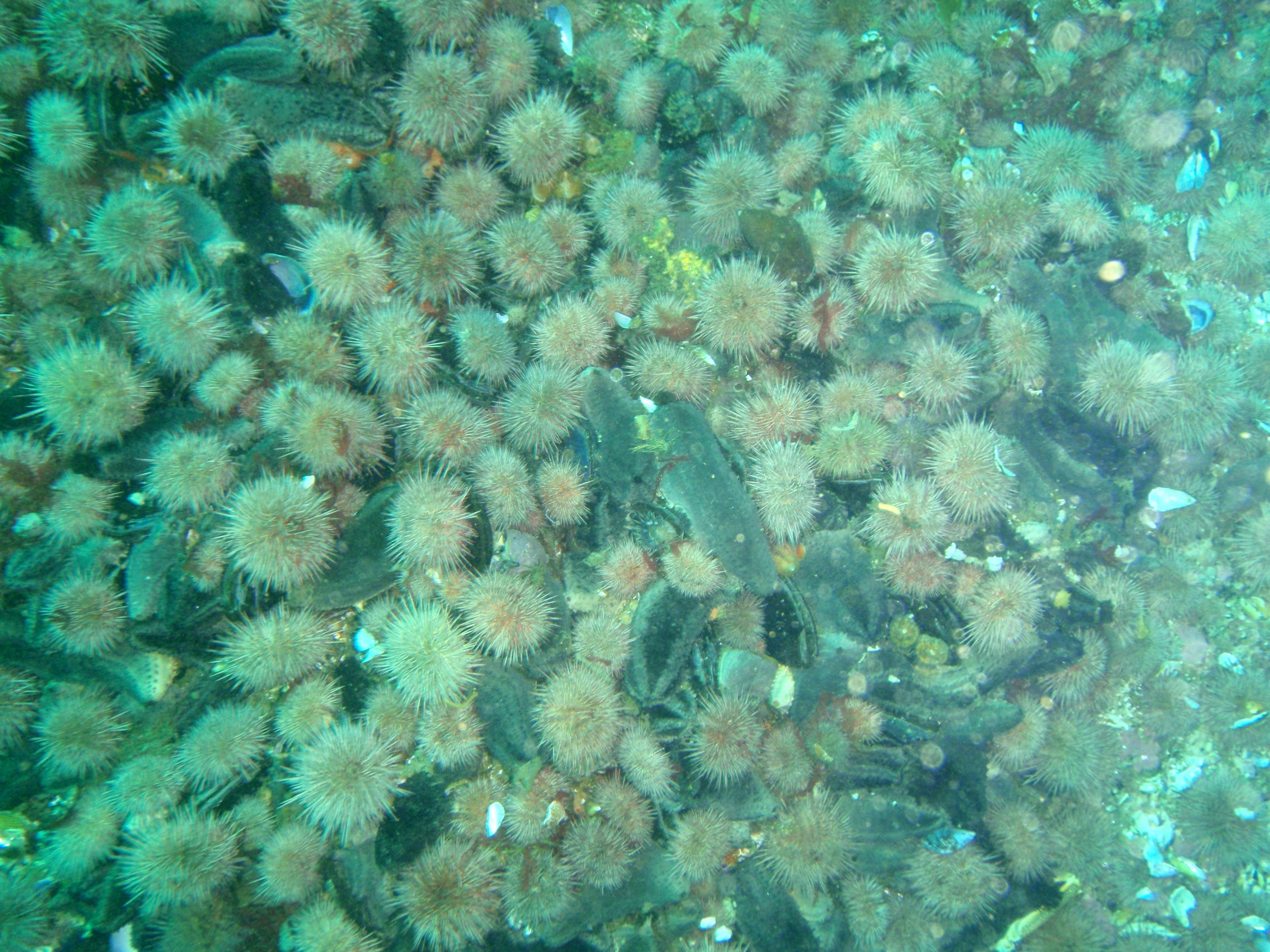
Urchins at Cleeves tunnel

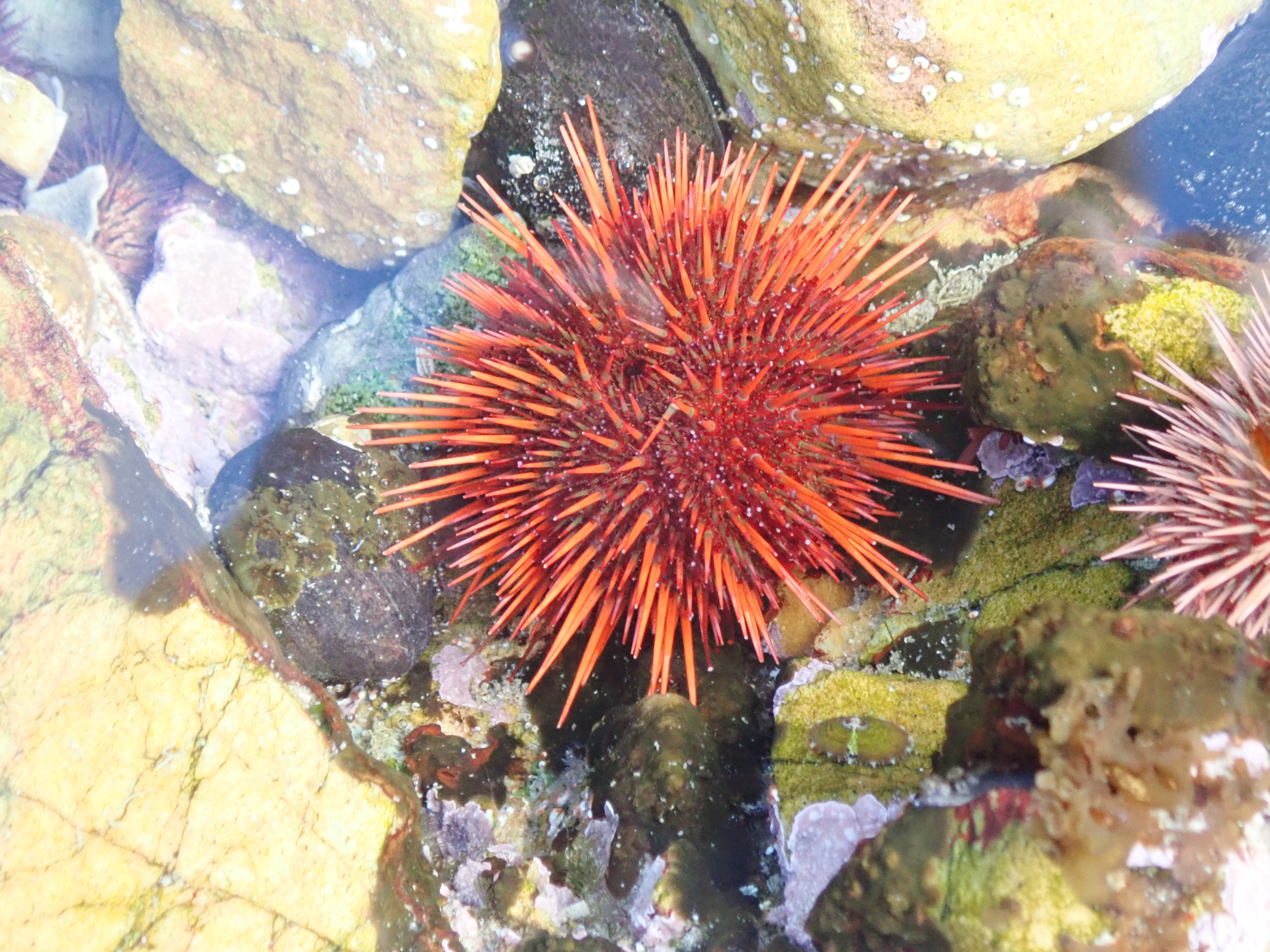
Red colour morph
