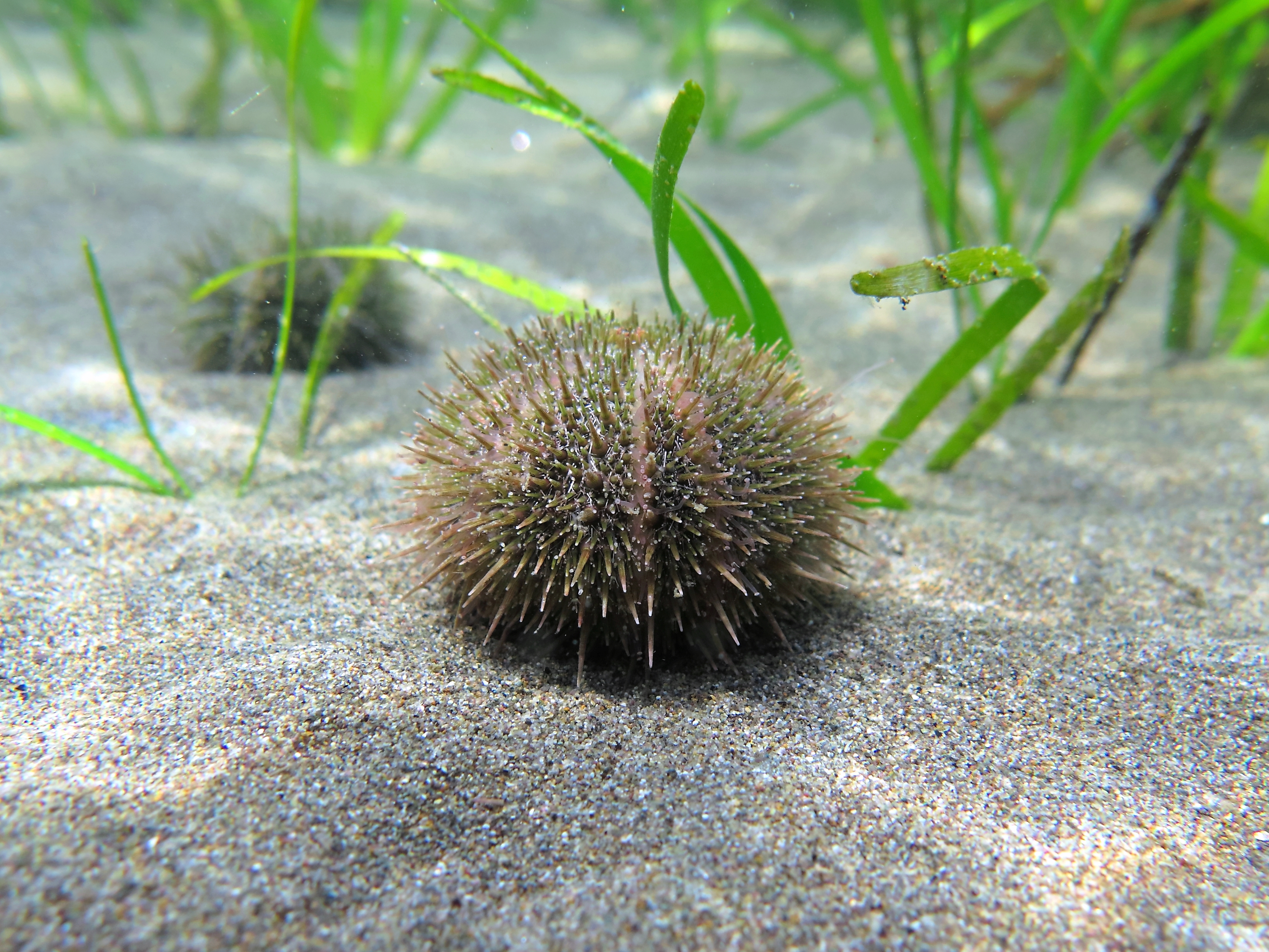

Scientific classification
- Kingdom: Animalia
- Phylum: Echinodermata
- Class: Echinoidea
- Order: Camarodonta
- Family: Parechinidae
- Genus: Psammechinus
- Species: P. microtuberculatus

Binomial name
- Psammechinus microtuberculatus (Blainville, 1825)

Synonyms
- Echinus (Psammechinus) microtuberculatus Blainville, 1825; Echinus decoratus L. Agassiz, 1841; Echinus microtuberculatus Blainville, 1825; Echinus parvituberculatus Blainville, 1834; Echinus pulchellus L. Agassiz, 1841; Psammechinus parvituberculatus (Blainville, 1834); Psammechinus pulchellus (L. Agassiz, 1841)

= Psammechinus microtuberculatus =

Species of sea urchin

Psammechinus microtuberculatus, also known as the green sea urchin, in the family Parechinidae. It was formerly known as Echinus microtuberculatus, and thought to be of the genus Echinus.

== Description ==
This is a small, brown, herbivorous sea urchin nearly spherical in shape. It has with short spines greenish or whitish in colour. It grows to a maximum diameter of 5 centimetres.

== Distribution ==
Psammechinus microtuberculatus is found in the western and eastern Atlantic Ocean, the Adriatic Sea and Aegean Sea. It also occurs throughout the entire Mediterranean Sea, though very rare.

== Habitat ==
This species occurs in the benthic zone at depths of between 1 and 685 metres. It prefers to live near sandy areas, and can be found on hard bottoms of mud or rock.

== Behavior ==
Psammechinus microtuberculatus is capable of protective camouflage. Under hypoxic conditions, it has been observed to discard its "protecting camouflages when confronted with low DO [dissolved oxygen] concentrations" in order "to increase mobility and/or reduce oxygen demand".

== Parasites ==
Psammechinus microtuberculatus is known to host the following ectoparasites:

- Asterocheres minutus (Claus), (1889)
- Asterocheres violaceus (Claus), (1889)
