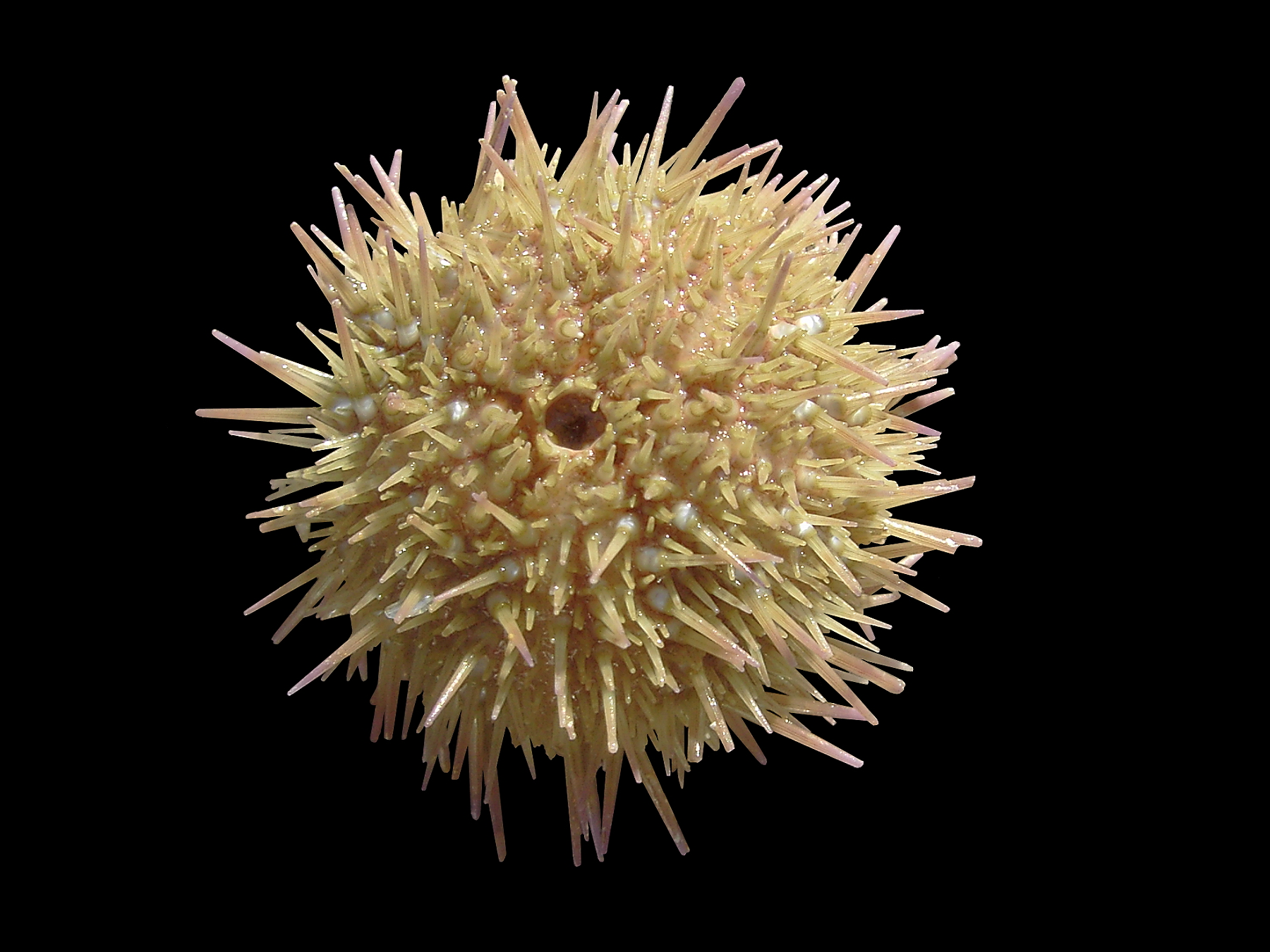

Scientific classification
- Kingdom: Animalia
- Phylum: Echinodermata
- Class: Echinoidea
- Order: Camarodonta
- Family: Parechinidae
- Genus: Psammechinus
- Species: P. miliaris

Binomial name
- Psammechinus miliaris (P.L.S. Müller, 1771)

Synonyms
- Echinus basteri Maitland, 1851; Echinus miliaris P.L.S. Müller, 1771; Echinus pustulatus L. Agassiz, 1841; Echinus virens Düben & Koren, 1844; Parechinus miliaris (P.L.S. Müller, 1771); Parechinus miliaris Mortensen, 1903; Psammechinus korenii L. Agassiz & Desor, 1846; Psammechinus pustulatus (L. Agassiz, 1841)

= Psammechinus miliaris =

Species of sea urchin

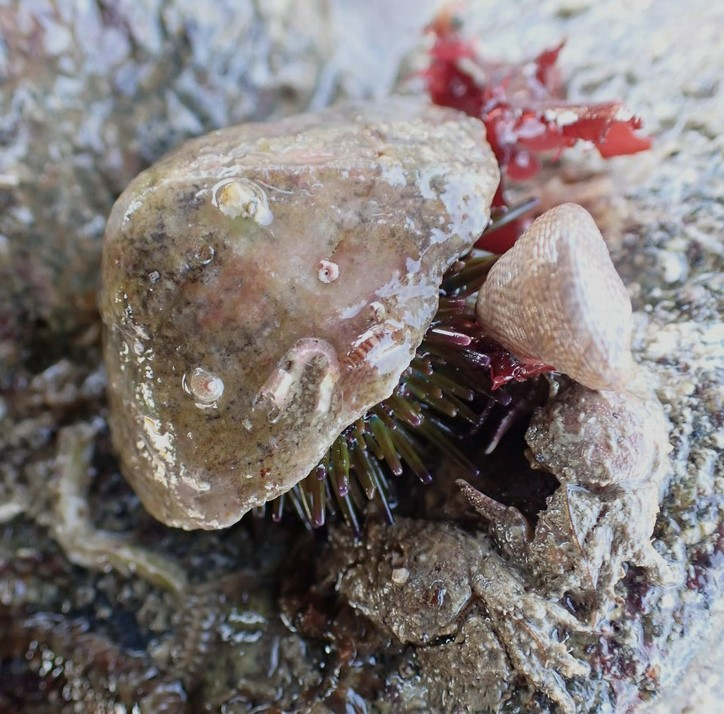
Psammechinus miliaris is often found covered in debris (empty shells, algae, gravel...) possibly for camouflage against predatory fishes. Brittany, France.

Psammechinus miliaris is a species of sea urchin in the family Parechinidae. It is sometimes known as the green sea urchin or shore sea urchin. It is found in shallow areas of the eastern Atlantic Ocean and the North Sea.

== Description ==
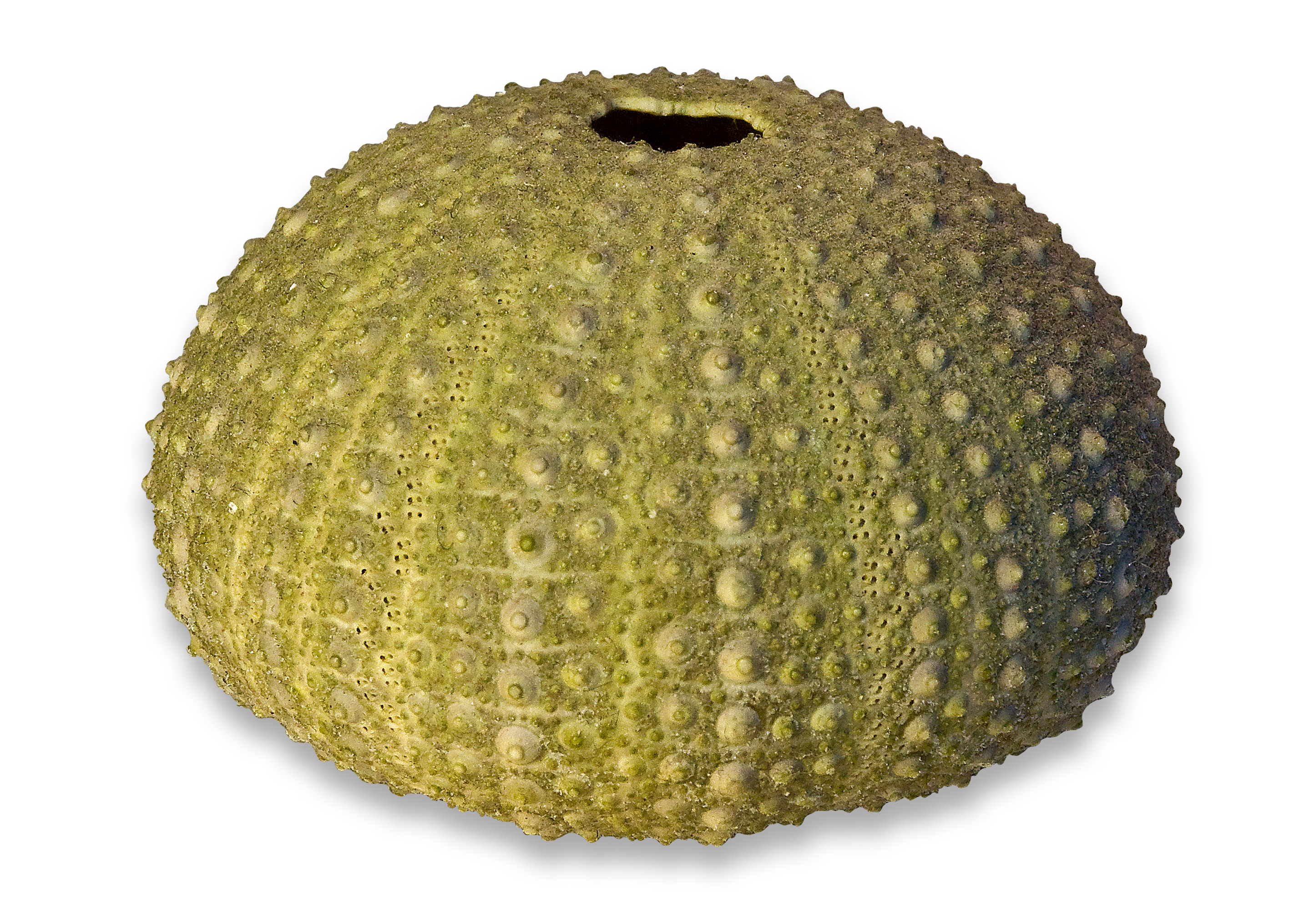
Test of Psammechinus miliaris

MRI scan

Psammechinus miliaris can reach a diameter of 5.75 cm (2.26 in). The test is globular, somewhat flattened dorso-ventrally, and up to five centimetres in diameter. It is covered in short, equi-length robust spines. The test and spines of shallow water specimens are purplish-brown but specimens from deeper water have a greenish test and pale coloured spines with purple tips. If individuals are transferred from one depth range to another, they retain their original colouration in their new location. On each ambulacral plate there are three pairs of tubercles each with a spine attached, the central one being a primary spine. On the ventral side, the orifices are relatively small and the buccal membrane is closely packed with thick plates with many pedicellariae but no spines. The globiferous pedicellariae are numerous but small and the tridentate pedicellariae are stout with broad blades.

== Distribution and habitat ==
Psammechinus miliaris occurs in the eastern Atlantic Ocean from Scandinavia south to Morocco, but not in the Mediterranean Sea. It is particularly common in the North Sea. It is mostly a littoral species but can be found from low tide mark down to a depth of one hundred metres. It is often found on or under Saccharina latissima, a large brown seaweed with which it shares its range. It occurs in a range of other habitats including under boulders and rocks, among seaweed, on rough ground such as oyster banks, in burrows in gravelly sediments and on the rhizomes of Zostera marina in seagrass meadows. The larvae often settle onto man-made structures such as ropes close to aquaculture facilities.

== Biology ==
Psammechinus miliaris is an omnivore and feeds on marine worms, hydroids, small crustaceans, molluscs, diatoms, macroalgae and detritus. It eats both fresh and rotting kelp (S. latissima) but the former is more difficult to digest and takes longer to pass through the gut. It is effective at removing fouling organisms from salmon cages and oyster trays.

Spawning takes place in spring and early summer. The female releases a single batch of 80,000 to 2,500,000 eggs into the water column where they are fertilised. The echinopluteus larvae form part of the zooplankton for one to two months before settling on the sea bed and undergoing metamorphosis.

Psammechinus miliaris is sometimes present in large numbers in suitable habitats. In a shallow Zostera marina meadow off the west coast of Scotland, they were recorded at 182 per square metre and 28 per square metre on the adjacent muddy sediment. In littoral habitats they can reach densities of 352 individuals per square metre. Their grazing and predation have a considerable effect on the benthic ecology and if they are experimentally removed from an area, there is a significant change in the community of encrusting organisms. In one study it was found that the tube worm Pomatoceros increased as did the more ephemeral algal species. Another study found that an individual urchin could eat 8 to 12 barnacles (Semibalanus balanoides) or 6 mussels (Mytilus edulis) in a day.

== Use as food ==
The gonads of P. miliaris are sometimes eaten, particularly in Mediterranean cuisine. They are small in specimens caught in the wild but larger in individuals that have been eating prepared salmon food and the possibility of aquaculture is being investigated.
