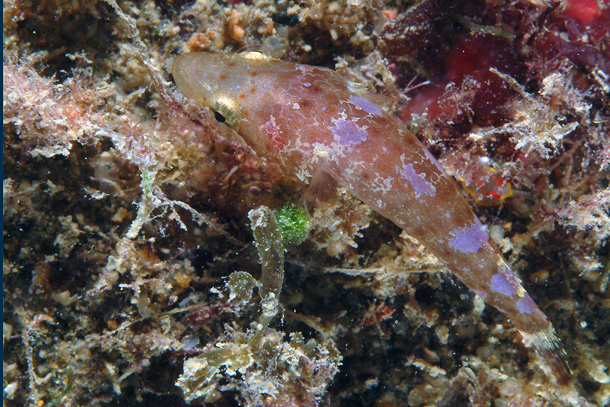

Conservation status
- Least Concern (IUCN 3.1)

Scientific classification
- Kingdom: Animalia
- Phylum: Chordata
- Class: Actinopterygii
- Order: Blenniiformes
- Family: Gobiesocidae
- Genus: Apletodon
- Species: A. incognitus

Binomial name
- Apletodon incognitus Hofrichter (de) & Patzner, 1997

= Apletodon incognitus =

Species of fish

Apletodon incognitus is a species of clingfish of the family Gobiesocidae. The species is endemic to north-eastern Atlantic Ocean to north-western Mediterranean Sea. The juvenile fish which measure around 1–2 centimetres (0.39–0.79 in) standard length (SL) are frequently recorded as having an association with sea urchins and in beds of Posidonia oceanica. The adults hide under stones covered with red coralline algae and in the empty shells of mussels near beds of Posidonia and Cymodocea nodosa. Within the beds of Posidonia it is often found in sympatry with Opeatogenys gracilis.
