= Acanthocidaris curvatispinis =

Scientific classification
- Kingdom: Animalia
- Phylum: Echinodermata
- Class: Echinoidea
- Order: Cidaroida
- Family: Cidaridae
- Genus: Acanthocidaris
- Species: A. curvatispinis

Binomial name
- Acanthocidaris curvatispinis (Bell, 1892)

Species of sea urchin

Acanthocidaris curvatispinis is a species of sea urchin of the family Cidaridae. Their armour is covered with spines. It came from the genus Acanthocidaris and lives in the sea. Acanthocidaris curvatispinis was first scientifically described in 1892 by Bell.
