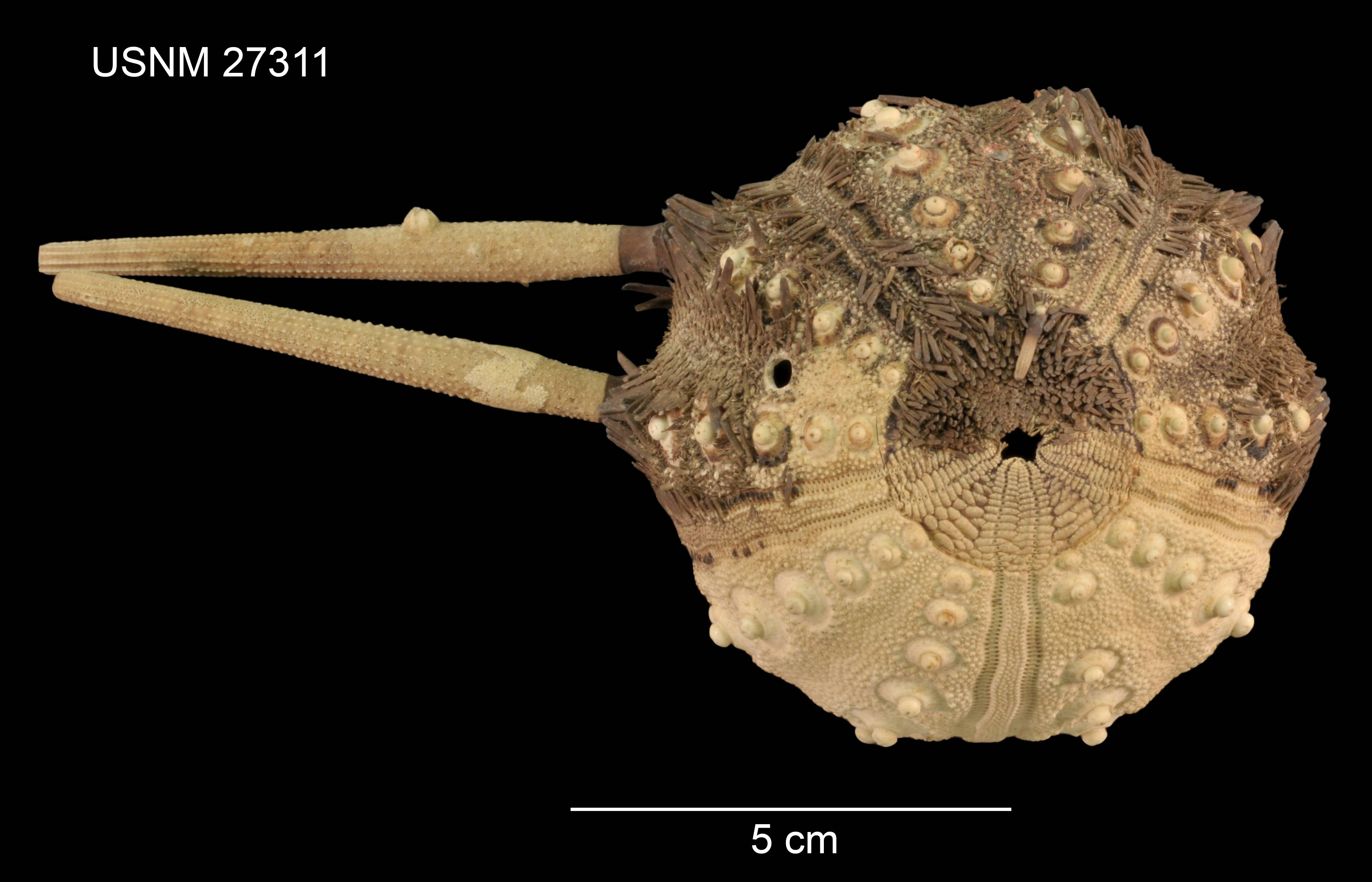

Scientific classification
- Kingdom: Animalia
- Phylum: Echinodermata
- Class: Echinoidea
- Order: Cidaroida
- Family: Cidaridae
- Genus: Prionocidaris
- Species: P. thomasi

Binomial name
- Prionocidaris thomasi (A. Agassiz & H.L. Clark, 1907)

Synonyms
- Actinocidaris thomasi (A. Agassiz & H.L. Clark, 1907); Leiocidaris thomasi (A. Agassiz & H.L. Clark, 1907); Phyllacanthus thomasi A. Agassiz & H.L. Clark, 1907

= Prionocidaris thomasi =

Species of echinoderm

Prionocidaris thomasi, commonly known as Thomas's urchin, is a species of echinoderms belonging to the family Cidaridae.

== Description ==
This urchin is characterised by its fuzzy-looking spines and bright maroon color. The fuzz on its spines is caused by algae growth, and its characteristic maroon color comes from the smaller secondary spines located below the larger, thicker spines. The largest size it can reach is about 5 or 6 in (130 or 150 mm) including their spines.

== Feeding and mobility ==
Prionocidaris thomasi uses small tube feet underneath its body to move across the rocks it inhabits. It uses five calcareous teeth, called Aristotle's lantern, to scrape algae off rocks.

== Reproduction ==
Prionocidaris thomasi can reproduce both sexually and asexually. Like most other echinoderms, Thomas's urchin releases gametes into the water so that they can be fertilized during mass spawning events. After a few months of swimming around and eating phytoplankton, larvae of P thomasi will find a suitable area to transform into their juvenile form, which more closely resembles their adult form.

== Distribution and habitat ==
This species of urchins is native to the central and eastern Pacific Ocean. It can be found across the islands within the Papahānaumokuākea Marine National Monument, as well as on Kauaʻi and Oʻahu. It is typically found around 1 100–150 m (330–490 ft) deep but can be found in shallower areas as well. However, it is occasionally seen in as little as 9 m (30 ft) of water in places like Sharks Cove on the North Shore of Oahu and other protected reefs, such as those around Midway Atoll.

== Conservation ==
Prionocidaris thomasi, just like many other sea urchins, faces the threat of aquarium collectors, and climate change which causes coral to bleach and die.
