= Austrocidaris pawsoni =

Scientific classification
- Kingdom: Animalia
- Phylum: Echinodermata
- Class: Echinoidea
- Order: Cidaroida
- Family: Cidaridae
- Genus: Austrocidaris
- Species: A. pawsoni

Binomial name
- Austrocidaris pawsoni McKnight, 1974

Species of sea urchin

Austrocidaris pawsoni is a species of sea urchins of the Family Cidaridae. Their armour is covered with spines. Austrocidaris pawsoni was first scientifically described in 1974 by McKnight.
