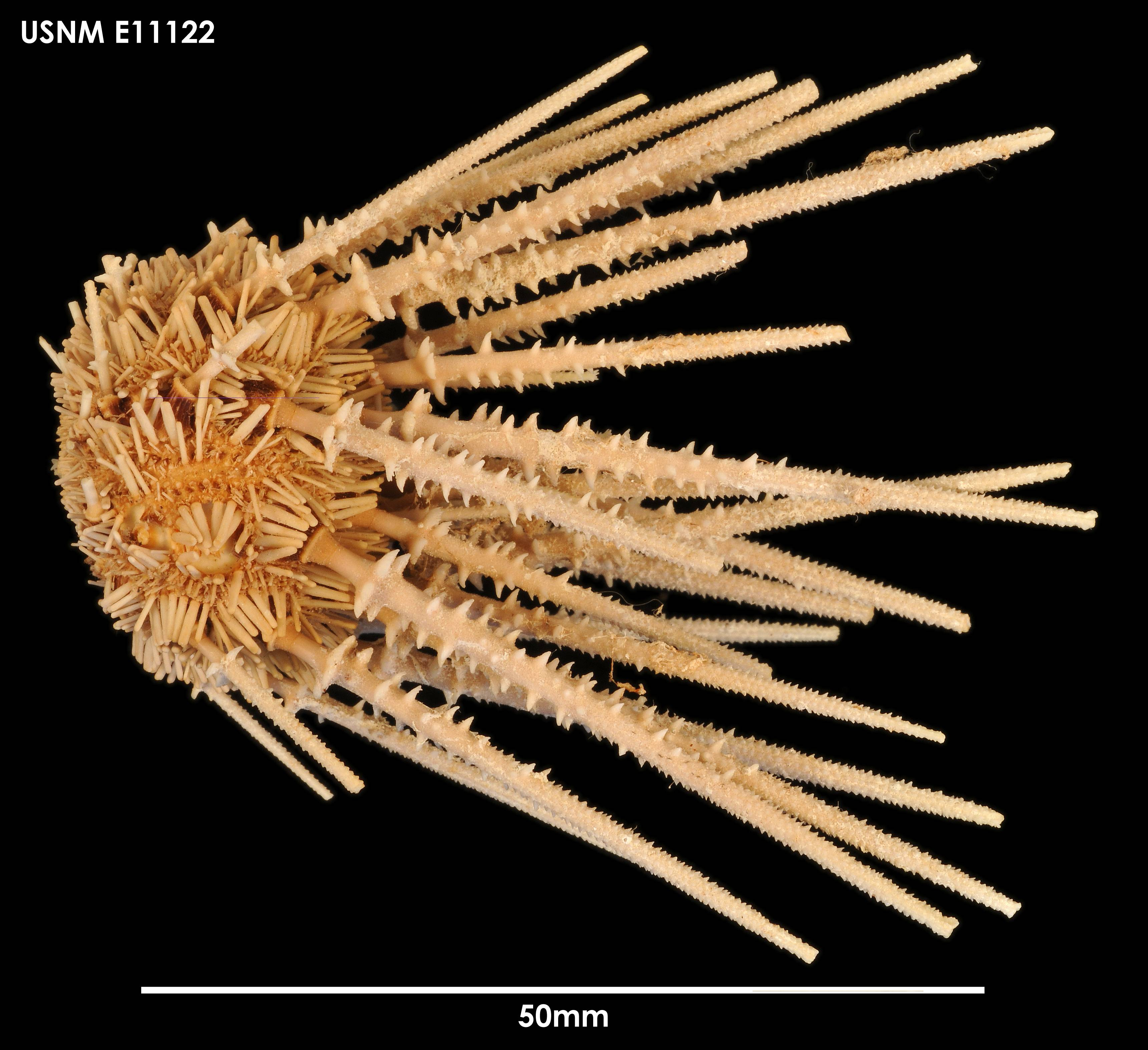

Scientific classification
- Kingdom: Animalia
- Phylum: Echinodermata
- Class: Echinoidea
- Order: Cidaroida
- Family: Cidaridae
- Genus: Austrocidaris
- Species: A. spinulosa

Binomial name
- Austrocidaris spinulosa (Mortensen, 1910)

= Austrocidaris spinulosa =

Species of sea urchin

Austrocidaris spinulosa is a species of sea urchins of the family Cidaridae. Their armour is covered with spines. Austrocidaris spinulosa was first scientifically described in 1910 by Ole Mortensen.
