= Austrocidaris canaliculata =

Scientific classification
- Kingdom: Animalia
- Phylum: Echinodermata
- Class: Echinoidea
- Order: Cidaroida
- Family: Cidaridae
- Genus: Austrocidaris
- Species: A. canaliculata

Binomial name
- Austrocidaris canaliculata (Agassiz, 1863)

Species of sea urchin

Austrocidaris canaliculata is a species of sea urchins of the family Cidaridae. Their armour is covered with spines. Austrocidaris canaliculata was first scientifically described in 1863 by Alexander Agassiz.
