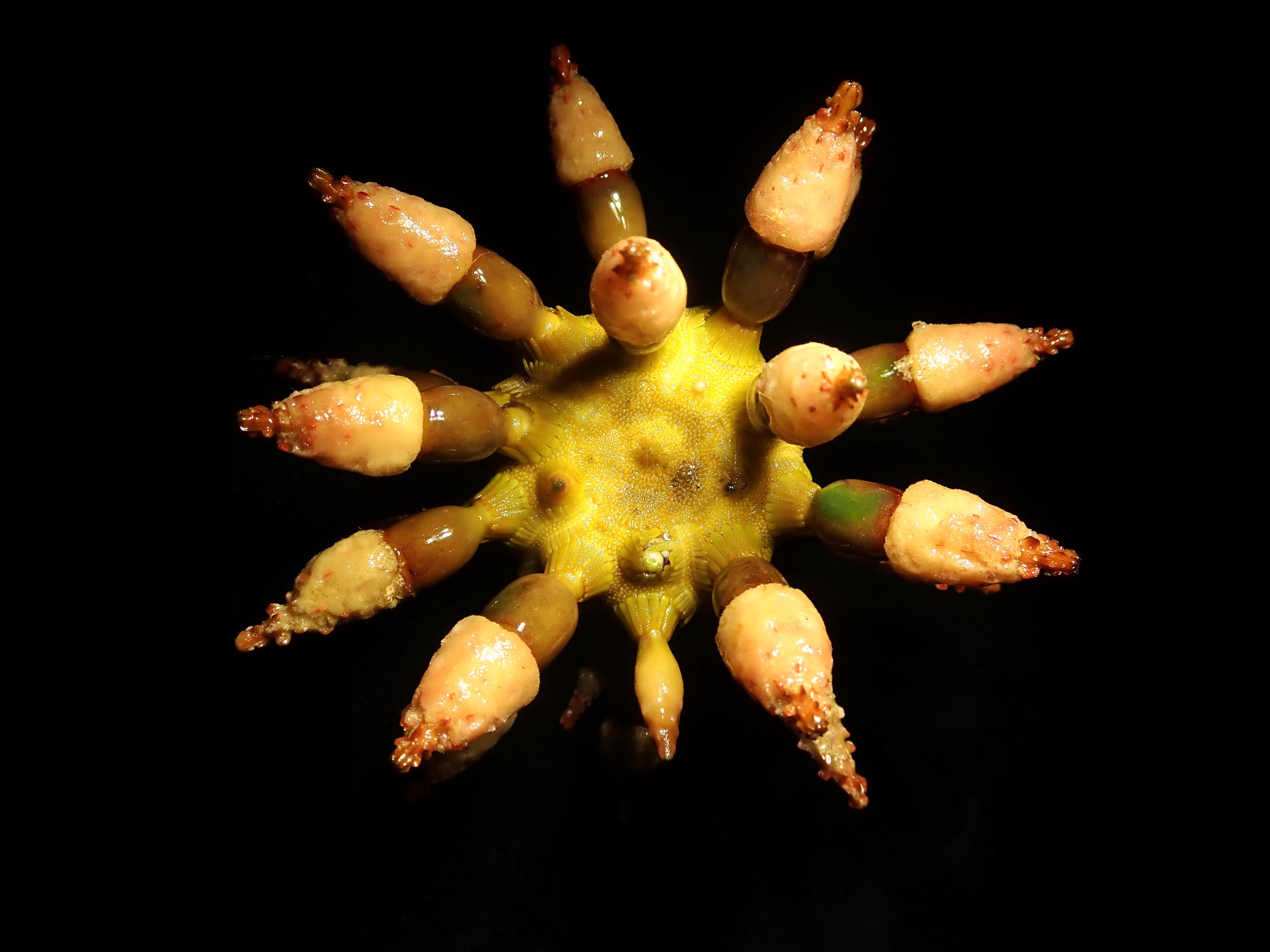

Scientific classification
- Kingdom: Animalia
- Phylum: Echinodermata
- Class: Echinoidea
- Order: Cidaroida
- Family: Cidaridae
- Genus: Chondrocidaris
- Species: C. brevispina

Binomial name
- Chondrocidaris brevispina (Clark, 1925)

= Chondrocidaris brevispina =

Species of sea urchin

Chondrocidaris brevispina, the raspberry sea urchin, is a species of sea urchins of the family Cidaridae. Their armour is covered with short, conical spines.

Chondrocidaris brevispina was first scientifically described in 1925 by Hubert Lyman Clark.
