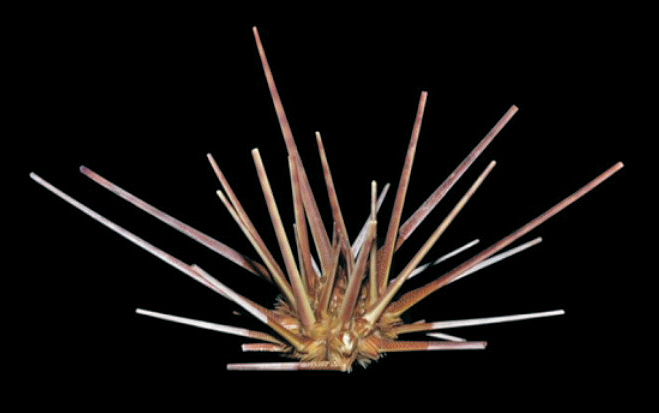

Scientific classification
- Domain: Eukaryota
- Kingdom: Animalia
- Phylum: Echinodermata
- Class: Echinoidea
- Order: Cidaroida
- Family: Cidaridae
- Genus: Acanthocidaris
- Species: A. maculicollis

Binomial name
- Acanthocidaris maculicollis (de Meijere, 1904)

= Acanthocidaris maculicollis =

Species of sea urchin

Acanthocidaris maculicollis is a species of sea urchin of the family Cidaridae. Their armour is covered with spines. It came from the genus Acanthocidaris and lives in the sea. Acanthocidaris hastingeria was first scientifically described in 1904 by de Meijere.
