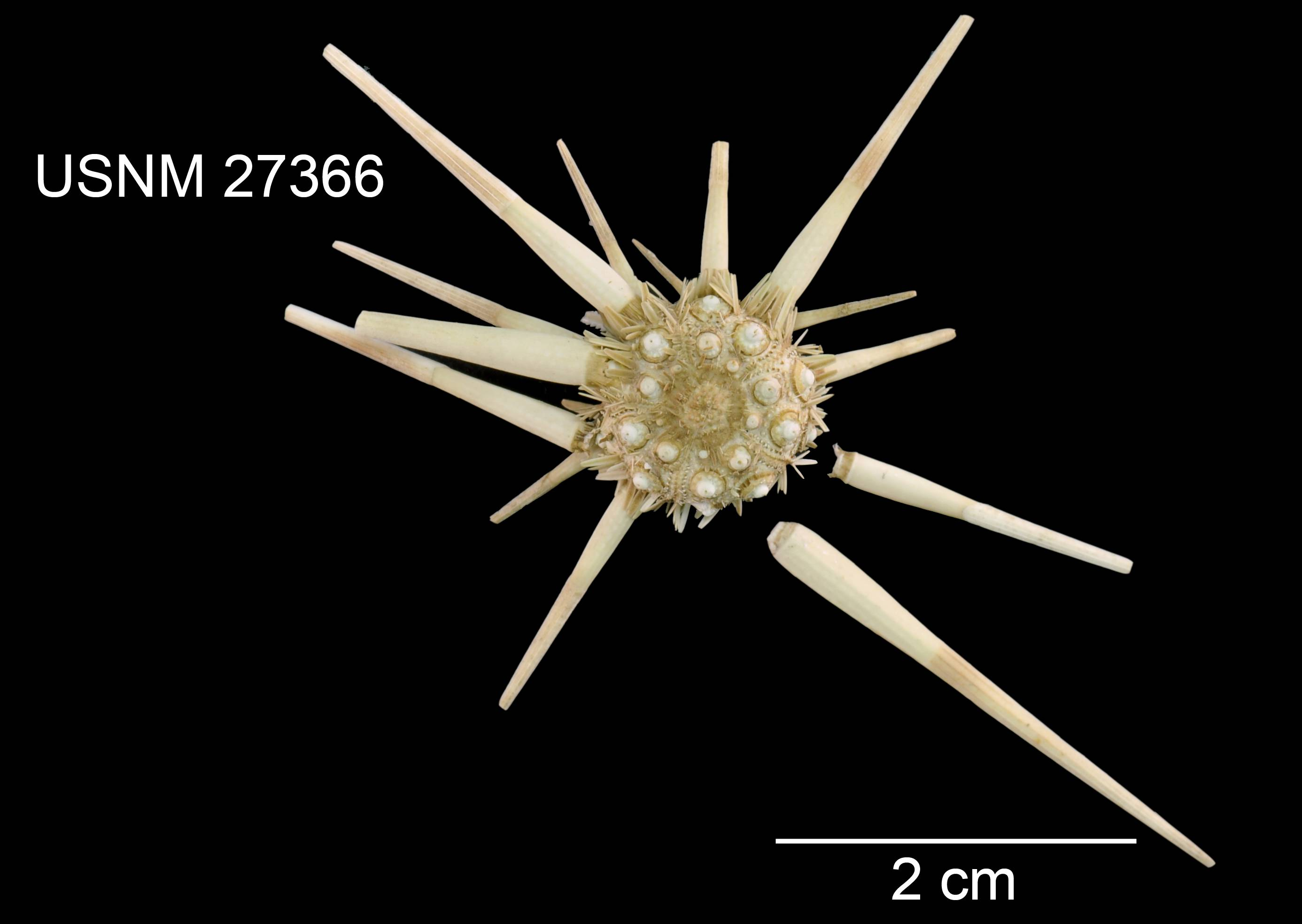

Scientific classification
- Kingdom: Animalia
- Phylum: Echinodermata
- Class: Echinoidea
- Order: Cidaroida
- Family: Cidaridae
- Genus: Acanthocidaris
- Species: A. hastigera

Binomial name
- Acanthocidaris hastigera Agassiz & Clark, 1907

Synonyms
- Acanthocidaris hastingeria

= Acanthocidaris hastigera =

Species of sea urchin

Acanthocidaris hastigera is a species of sea urchin of the family Cidaridae. It was first described in 1907 by Alexander Emanuel Agassiz & Hubert Lyman Clark.

== Description ==
Acanthocidaris hastigera is small in size with one recorded specimen weighing 121 g (4.3 oz). Acanthocidaris hastigera contains both primary and secondary spines. These secondary spines are brown in color. The primary spines are generally lighter in color with an almost pink appearance and yellow base. This urchin has small genital pores leading to corresponding small eggs possibly indicating the presence of pelagic larva. The test is white.

== Distribution ==
This species is endemic to Hawaii. It occurs in deeper parts of the ocean anywhere from 57–355 m (187–1,165 ft) deep.
