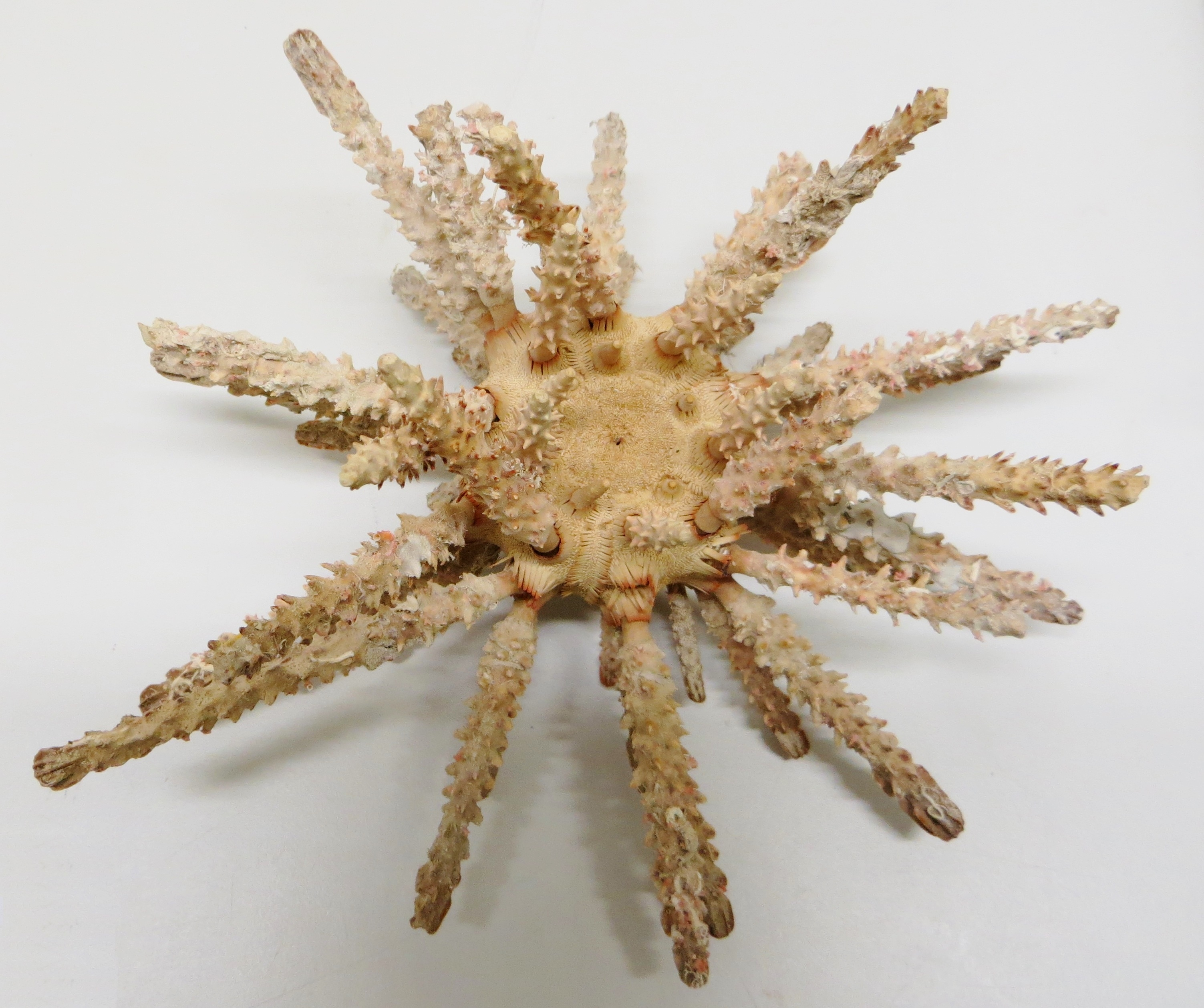
- Chondrocidaris gigantea

Scientific classification
- Domain: Eukaryota
- Kingdom: Animalia
- Phylum: Echinodermata
- Class: Echinoidea
- Order: Cidaroida
- Family: Cidaridae
- Subfamily: Cidarinae
- Genus: Chondrocidaris; Agassiz, 1863

Synonyms
- Menocidaris Philip, 1964

= Chondrocidaris =

Genus of sea urchins

Chondrocidaris is a genus of sea urchins of the family Cidaridae described in 1863 by Alexander Agassiz. There are two living species and several fossil species dating as far back as the Miocene.

Living species

- Chondrocidaris brevispina (Clark, 1925)
- Chondrocidaris gigantea (Agassiz, 1863)
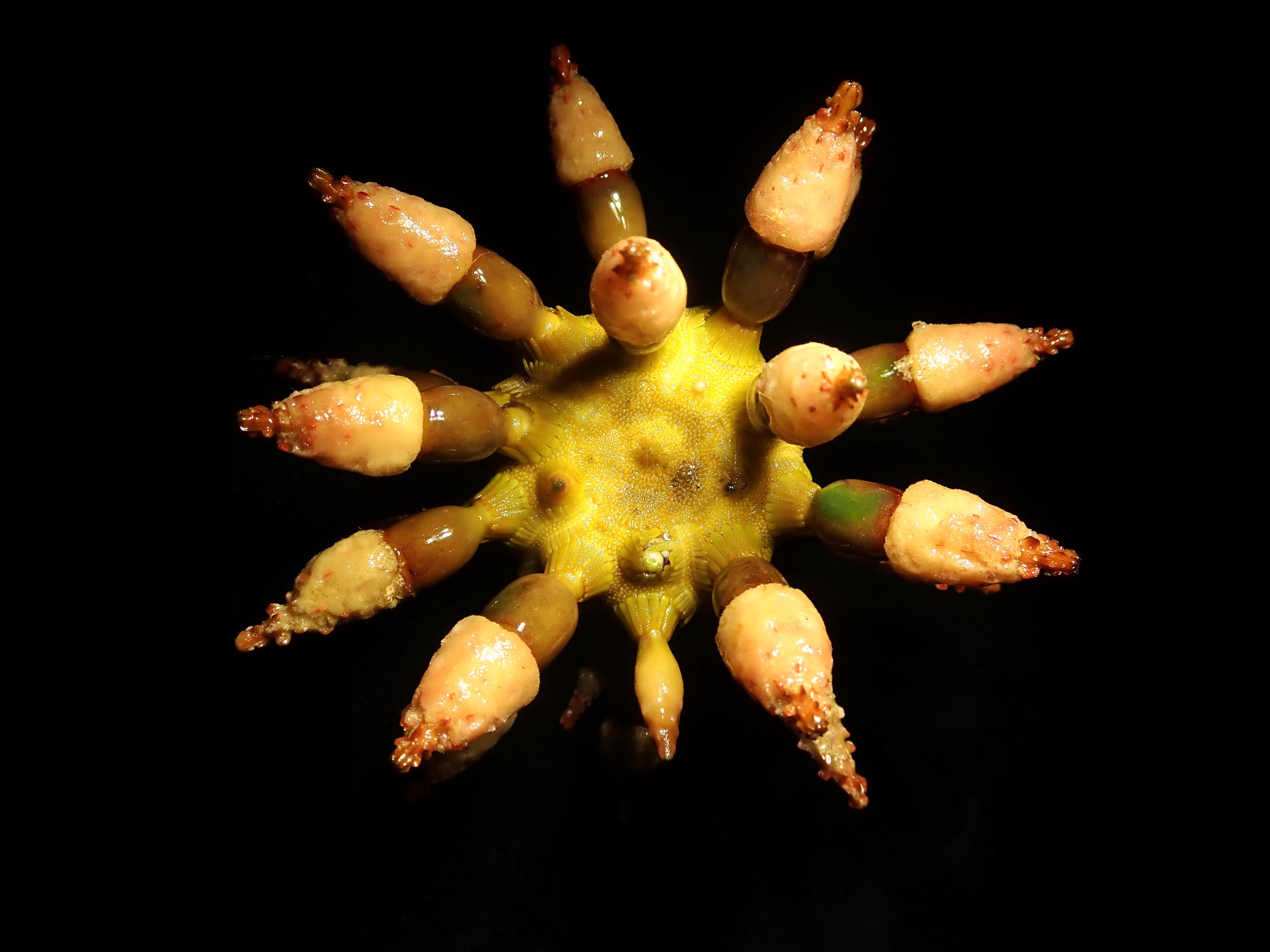
Chondrocidaris brevispina

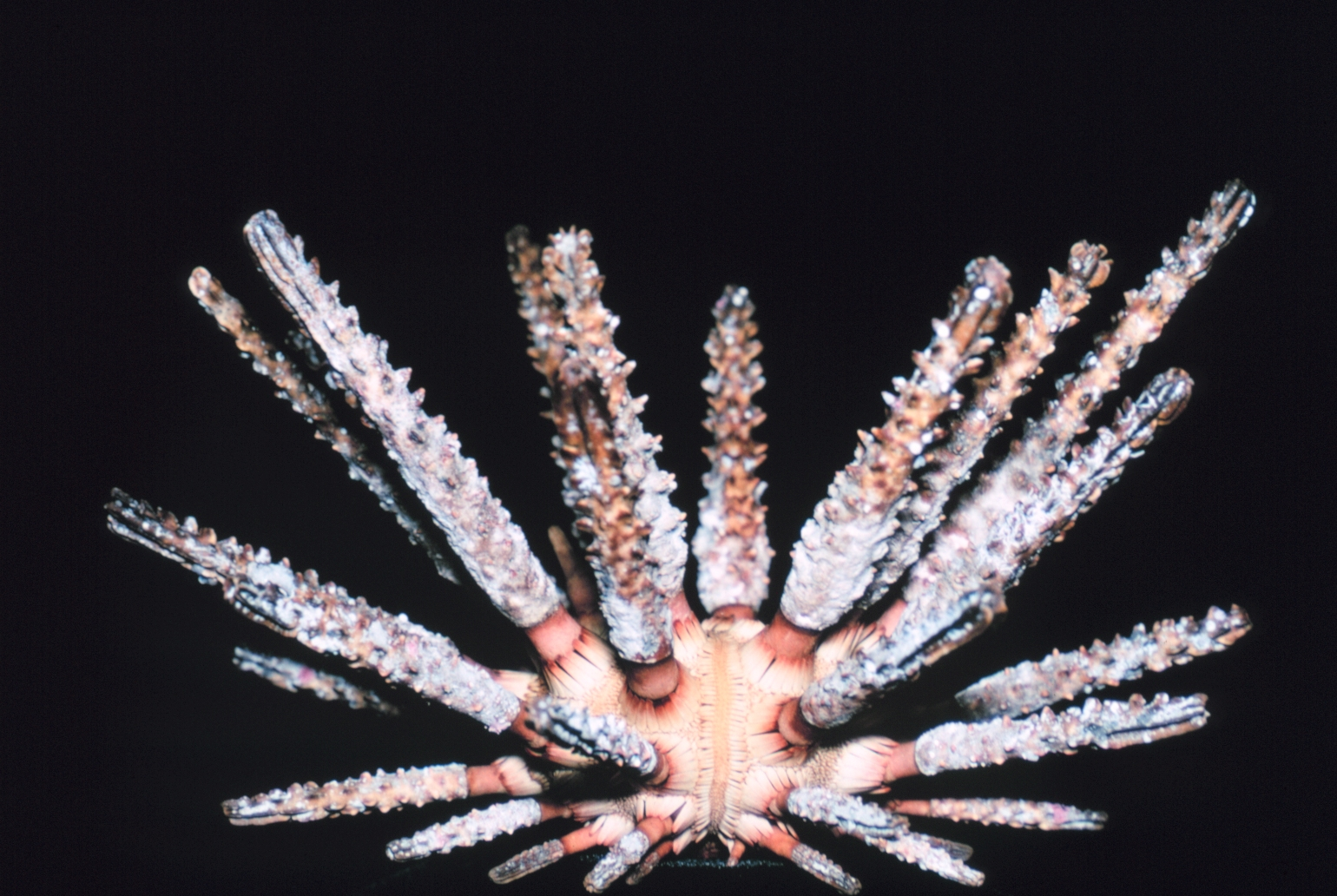
Chondrocidaris gigantea

Extinct species

- Chondrocidaris clarkii
- Chondrocidaris marianica
- Chondrocidaris problepteryx
