= Chorocidaris =

Scientific classification
- Kingdom: Animalia
- Phylum: Echinodermata
- Class: Echinoidea
- Order: Cidaroida
- Family: Cidaridae
- Subfamily: Cidarinae
- Genus: Chorocidaris; Ikeda, 1941
- Species: C. fusispina

Binomial name
- Chorocidaris fusispina (Mortensen, 1928)

Synonyms
- Chorocidaris micca Ikeda, 1941; Stylocidaris fusispina Mortensen, 1928

Species of sea urchin

Chorocidaris fusispina is a species of sea urchin in the family Cidaridae. It is the only species in the genus Chorocidaris.
