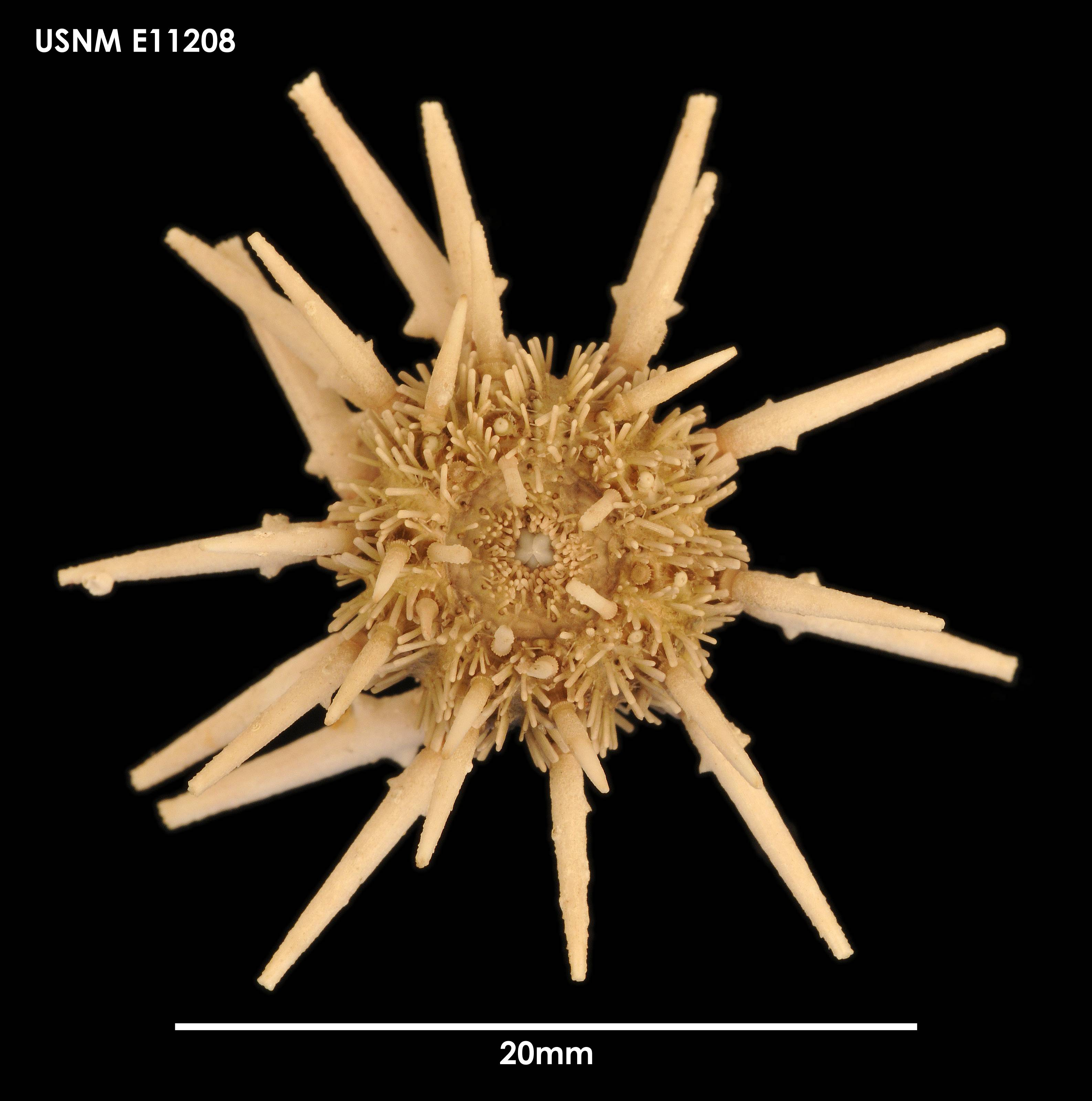
- Oral view of a dry specimen

Scientific classification
- Kingdom: Animalia
- Phylum: Echinodermata
- Class: Echinoidea
- Order: Cidaroida
- Family: Cidaridae
- Genus: Goniocidaris
- Species: G. umbraculum

Binomial name
- Goniocidaris umbraculum Hutton, 1878

= Goniocidaris umbraculum =

Species of sea urchin

Goniocidaris umbraculum (Māori: kina taratara) is a species of cidaroid sea urchin that inhabits the continental shelf off the southern coasts of New Zealand. It is plentiful on a seabed composed of seashell and bryozoan rubble at a depth of 95 m (310 ft) off Otago.

== Description ==
Goniocidaris umbraculum grows to a test diameter of 30 mm (1.2 in). The main spines are thick, blunt, and usually shorter that the test diameter. The ones on the aboral (upper) surface have small flat discs at the tip, and thornlike projections near the base. The test is greenish-brown and the spines are pale brown, often tinged green near the base. They are often overgrown by epiphytes such as hydroids, sponges and bryozoa.

== Distribution and habitat ==
Goniocidaris umbraculum is native to the sea around southern New Zealand; it is common in the Foveaux Strait, on the eastern coast of South Island as far north as Cook Strait and on the Chatham Rise, at depths between about 60 to 400 m (200 to 1,300 ft), on coarse sand or rubble.

== Ecology ==
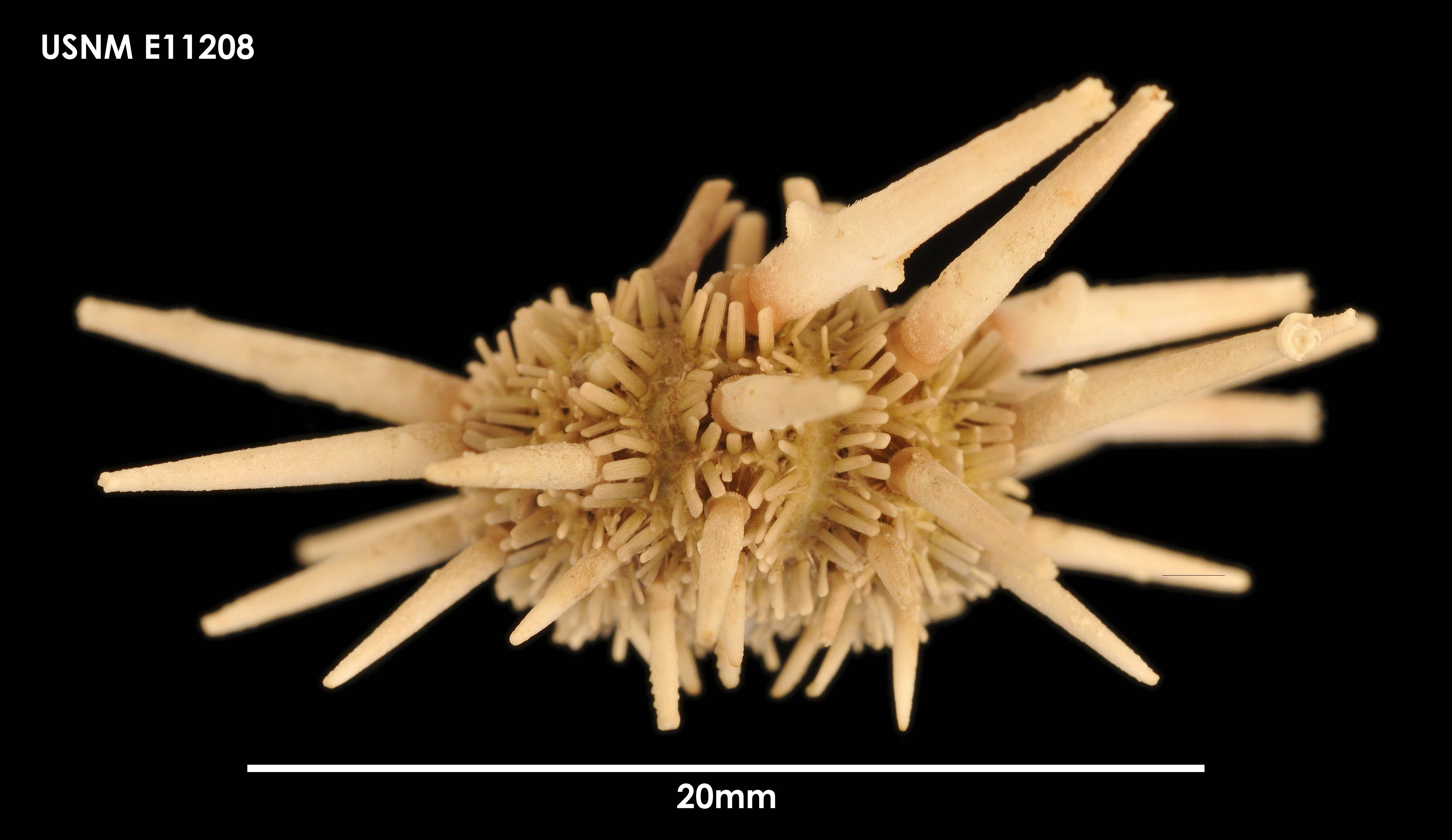
Lateral view

This sea urchin broods its eggs, carrying them on the flared peristome that surrounds its mouth. Prior to research into its breeding biology, only two other sea urchins that brood their young had been studied, Cassidulus caribaearum and Abatus cordatus, though several arctic and subarctic species were known to do so.

Goniocidaris umbraculum is a gonochoric species, individuals being either male or female. Spawning takes place around July. The eggs have large yolks and are buoyant, and if detached from the female, float to the surface. As they emerge from the gonopore on the aboral surface of the female, the eggs are retained. They are then moved to the peristome, a process that takes several minutes and is achieved by the action of the tube feet and cilia, the eggs being guided along channels between the spines; the peristome becomes slightly depressed in order to accommodate the eggs, which are retained by the spines surrounding the mouth for about two months. Sixty eggs can be held in place, and when the juveniles have developed tube feet, they move to other parts of the test, but continue to be brooded for another two months. This unusual reproductive strategy may have developed when this species evolved to live in the colder waters further south than other members of its genus.

Goniocidaris umbraculum feeds on the bryozoan Filicea elegans.
