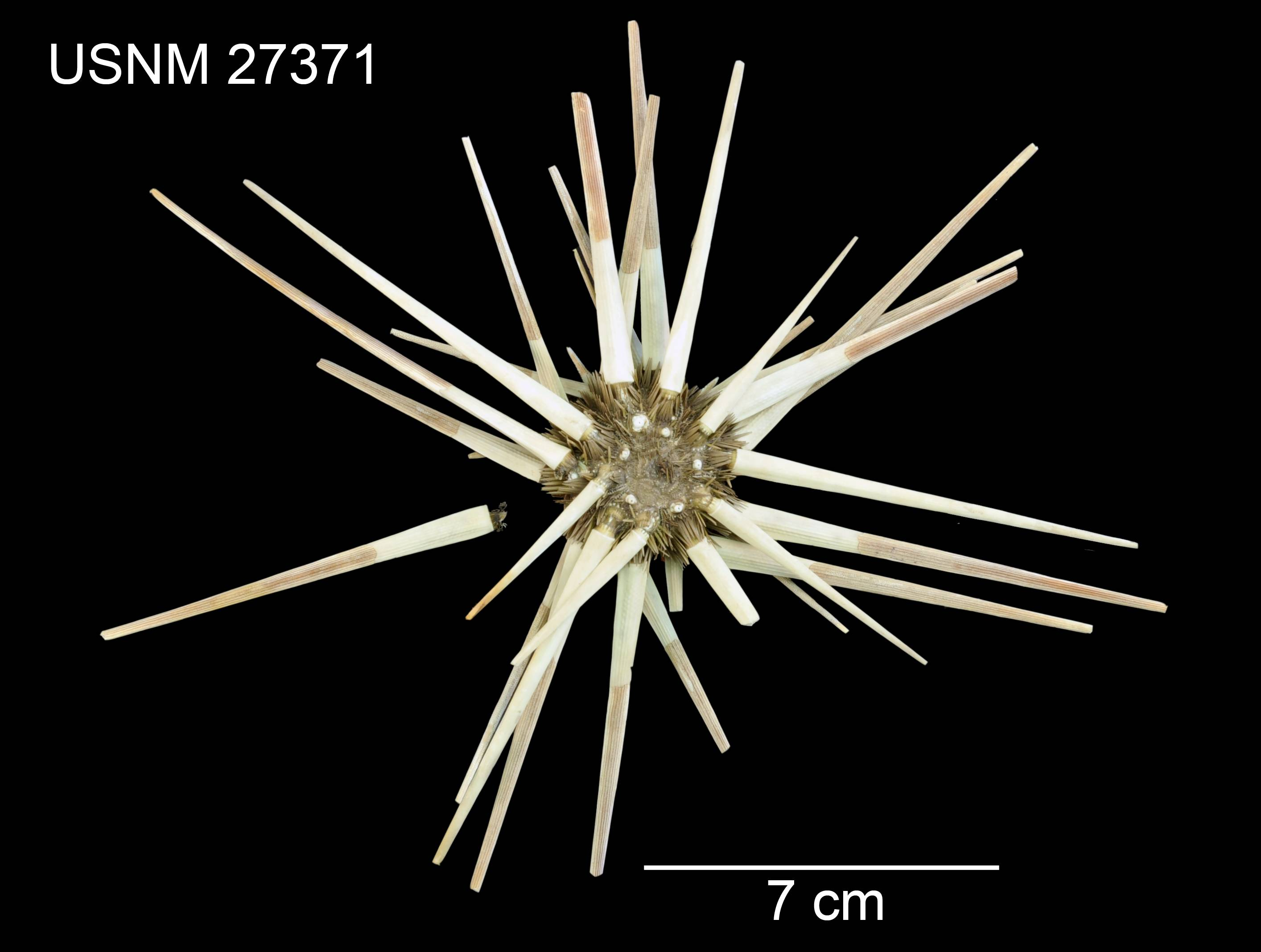
- Acanthocidaris hastigera

Scientific classification
- Kingdom: Animalia
- Phylum: Echinodermata
- Class: Echinoidea
- Order: Cidaroida
- Family: Cidaridae
- Subfamily: Stylocidarinae
- Genus: Acanthocidaris; Mortensen, 1903

= Acanthocidaris =

Genus of sea urchins

Acanthocidaris is a genus of echinoderms belonging to the family Cidaridae.

The species of this genus are found in Australia, Indian Ocean and Malesia.

Species:

- Acanthocidaris curvatispinis (Bell, 1892)
- Acanthocidaris hastigera A. Agassiz & H.L. Clark, 1907
- Acanthocidaris maculicollis (de Meijere, 1904)
