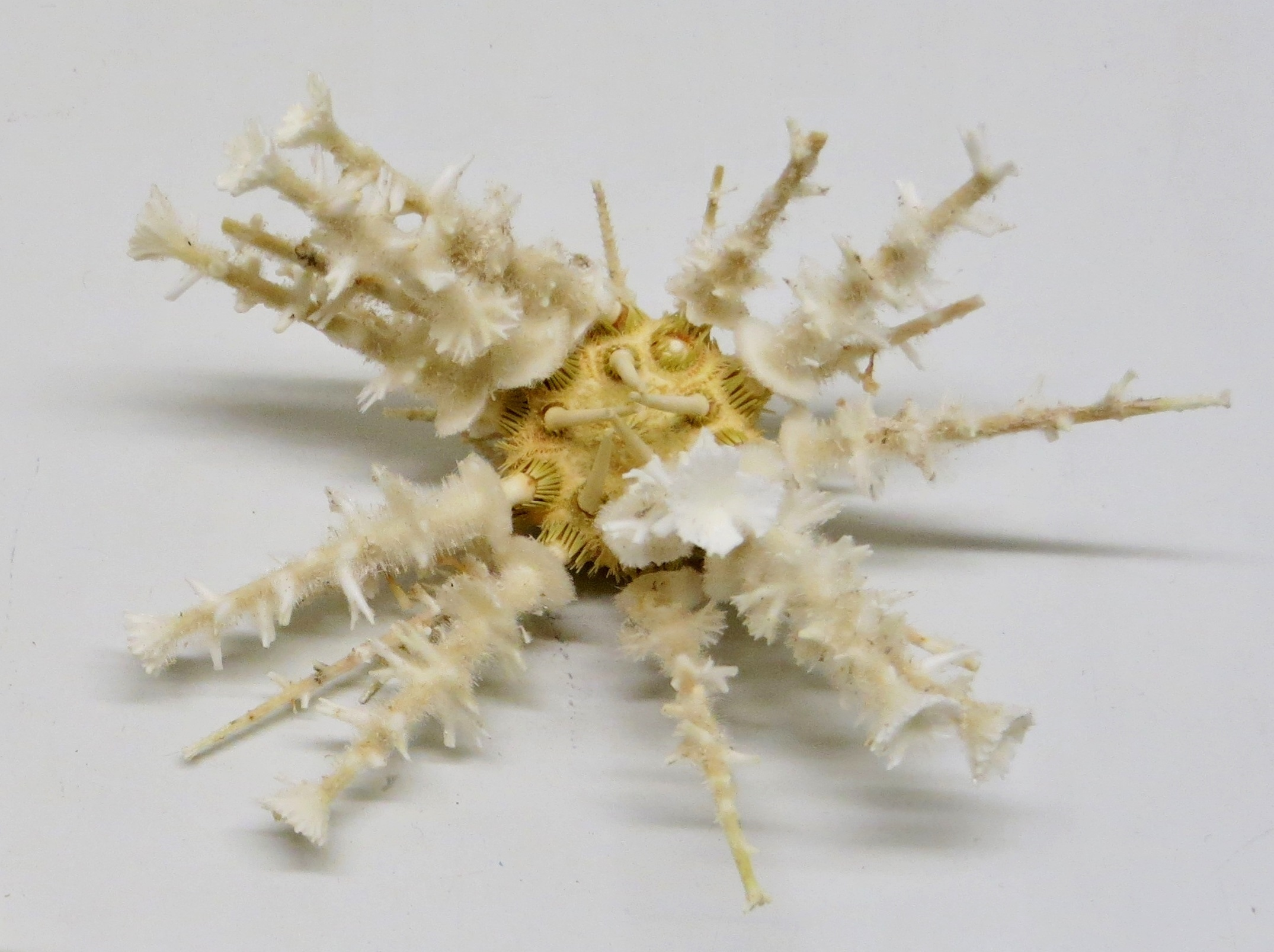
- Goniocidaris sp.

Scientific classification
- Kingdom: Animalia
- Phylum: Echinodermata
- Class: Echinoidea
- Order: Cidaroida
- Family: Cidaridae
- Subfamily: Goniocidarinae
- Genus: Goniocidaris; Desor, 1846

Subgenera & species
- See text

Synonyms
- Goniocidaria (misspelling); Stephanocidaris A. Agassiz, 1863 (junior synonym)

= Goniocidaris =

Genus of sea urchins

Goniocidaris is a genus of sea urchins (Echinoidea) in the family Cidaridae and typical of the subfamily Goniocidarinae. Extant species are mostly found in Indo-Pacific seas, often living at depth.

== Species ==
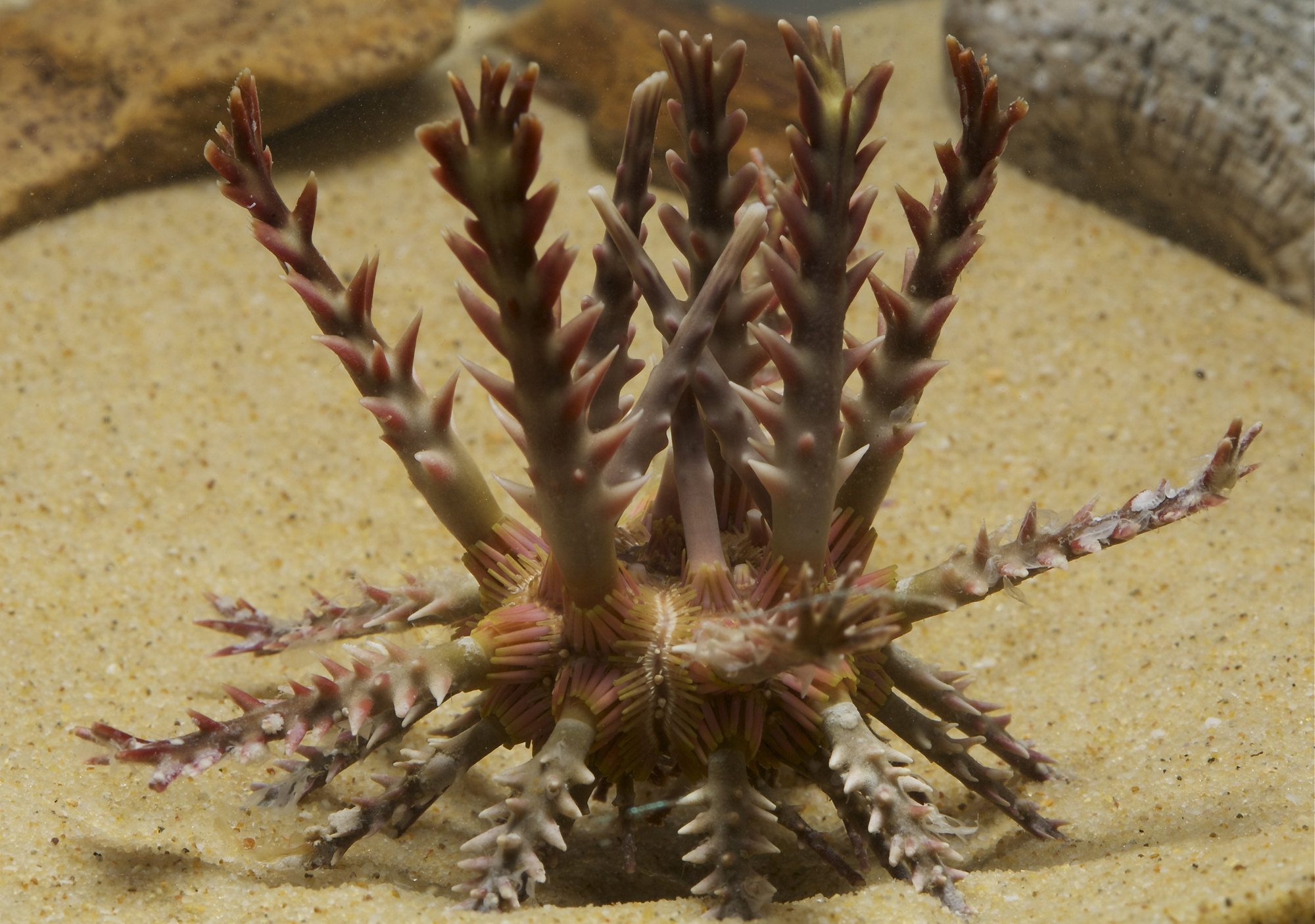
Goniocidaris tubaria

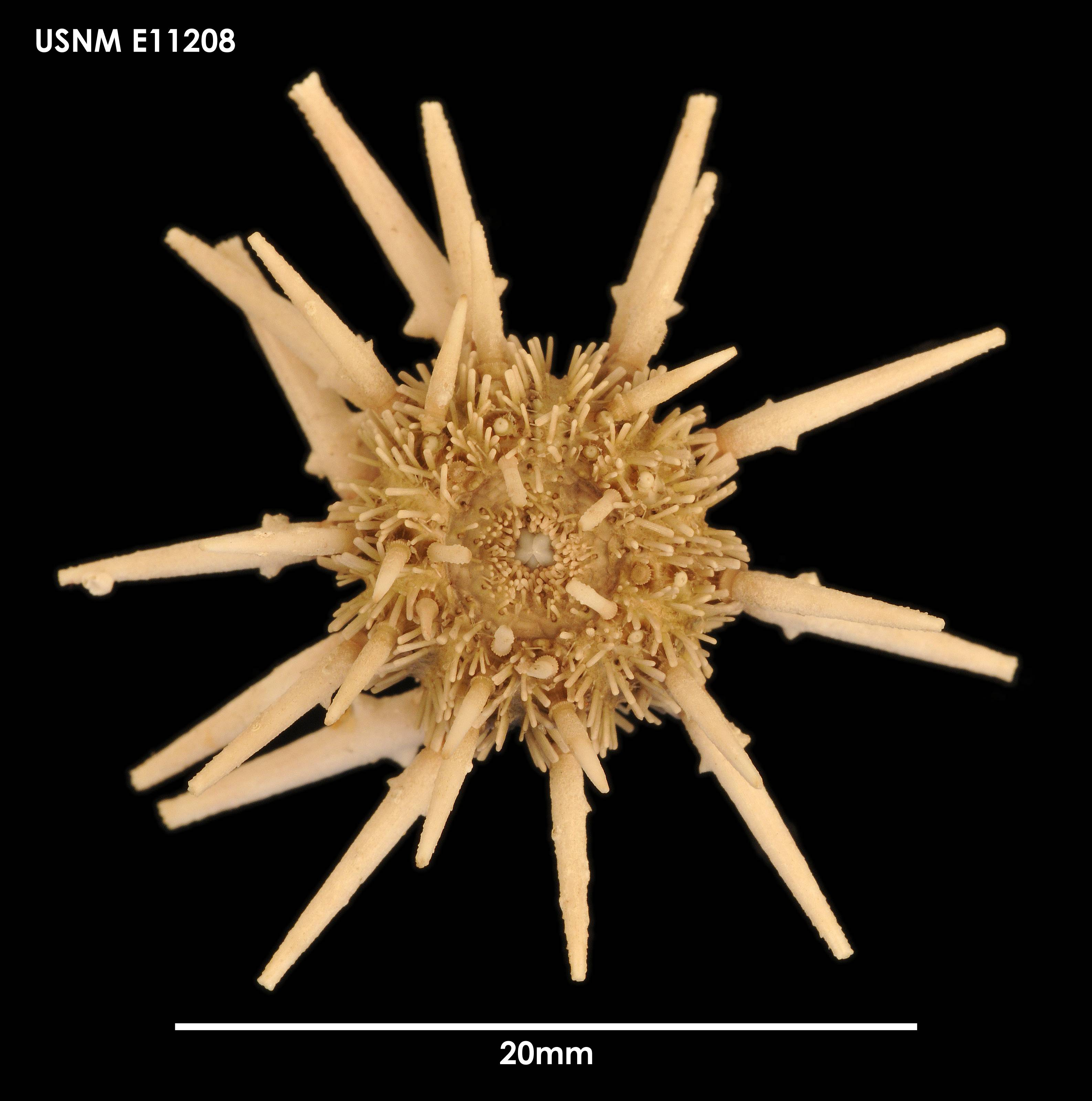
Goniocidaris umbraculum

subgenus Aspidocidaris Mortensen, 1928

- Goniocidaris alba Mortensen, 1928
- Goniocidaris australiae Mortensen, 1928
- Goniocidaris clypeata Döderlein, 1885
- Goniocidaris crassa Mortensen, 1928
- Goniocidaris fimbriata (De Meijere, 1904)
- Goniocidaris parasol Fell, 1958
- Goniocidaris sibogae Mortensen, 1928

subgenus Cyrtocidaris Mortensen, 1927

- Goniocidaris tenuispina Mortensen, 1927

subgenus Discocidaris Döderlein, 1885

- Goniocidaris mikado (Döderlein, 1885)
- Goniocidaris peltata Mortensen, 1927

subgenus Goniocidaris

- Goniocidaris balinensis Mortensen, 1932
- Goniocidaris indica Mortensen, 1939
- Goniocidaris tubaria (Lamarck, 1816) - type species
- Goniocidaris umbraculum Hutton, 1878

subgenus Petalocidaris Mortensen, 1903

- Goniocidaris biserialis (Döderlein, 1885)
- Goniocidaris florigera A. Agassiz, 1879
- Goniocidaris spinosa Mortensen, 1928

not placed in any subgenus

- Goniocidaris corona Baker, 1968
- Goniocidaris habanensis Sánchez Roig, 1949 †
- Goniocidaris hebe Fell, 1954 †
- Goniocidaris holguinensis Sánchez Roig, 1949 †
- Goniocidaris magi Pawson, 1964
- Goniocidaris mortenseni Chapman & Cudmore, 1934 †
- Goniocidaris murrayensis Chapman & Cudmore, 1934 †
- Goniocidaris praecipua Philip, 1964 †
- Goniocidaris pusilla Fell, 1954 †
