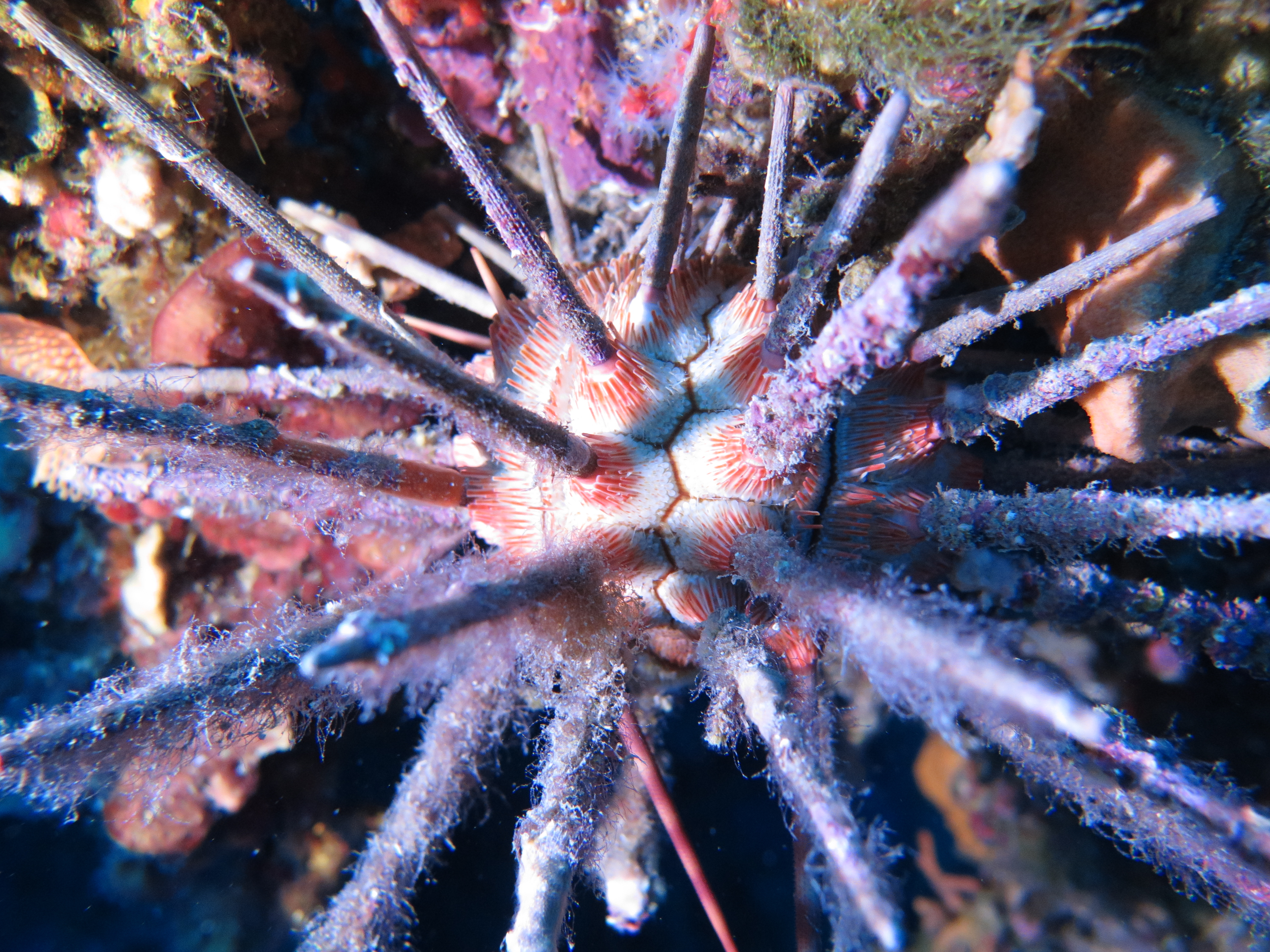
- Stylocidaris affinis

Scientific classification
- Kingdom: Animalia
- Phylum: Echinodermata
- Class: Echinoidea
- Order: Cidaroida
- Family: Cidaridae
- Subfamily: Stylocidarinae
- Genus: Stylocidaris; Mortensen, 1909

= Stylocidaris =

Genus of sea urchins

Stylocidaris is a genus of echinoderms belonging to the family Cidaridae.

The genus has almost cosmopolitan distribution.

== Species ==
Species:

- Stylocidaris affinis (Philippi, 1845)
- Stylocidaris albidens Clark, 1925
- Stylocidaris amboinae Mortensen, 1928
- Stylocidaris annulosa Mortensen, 1927
- Stylocidaris badia (H.L. Clark, 1925)
- Stylocidaris bracteata (A. Agassiz, 1879)
- Stylocidaris brevicollis (de Meijere, 1904)
- Stylocidaris calacantha (A. Agassiz & H.L. Clark, 1907)
- Stylocidaris chapmani Philip, 1963
- Stylocidaris cingulata Mortensen, 1932
- Stylocidaris conferta (H.L. Clark, 1916)
- Stylocidaris effluens Mortensen, 1927
- Stylocidaris laevispina Mortensen, 1939
- Stylocidaris lineata Mortensen, 1910
- Stylocidaris lorioli (Koehler, 1927)
- Stylocidaris maculosa Mortensen, 1928
- Stylocidaris reini (Döderlein, 1887)
- Stylocidaris rufa Mortensen, 1928
- Stylocidaris ryukyuensis Shigei, 1975
- Stylocidaris tiara (Anderson, 1894)
