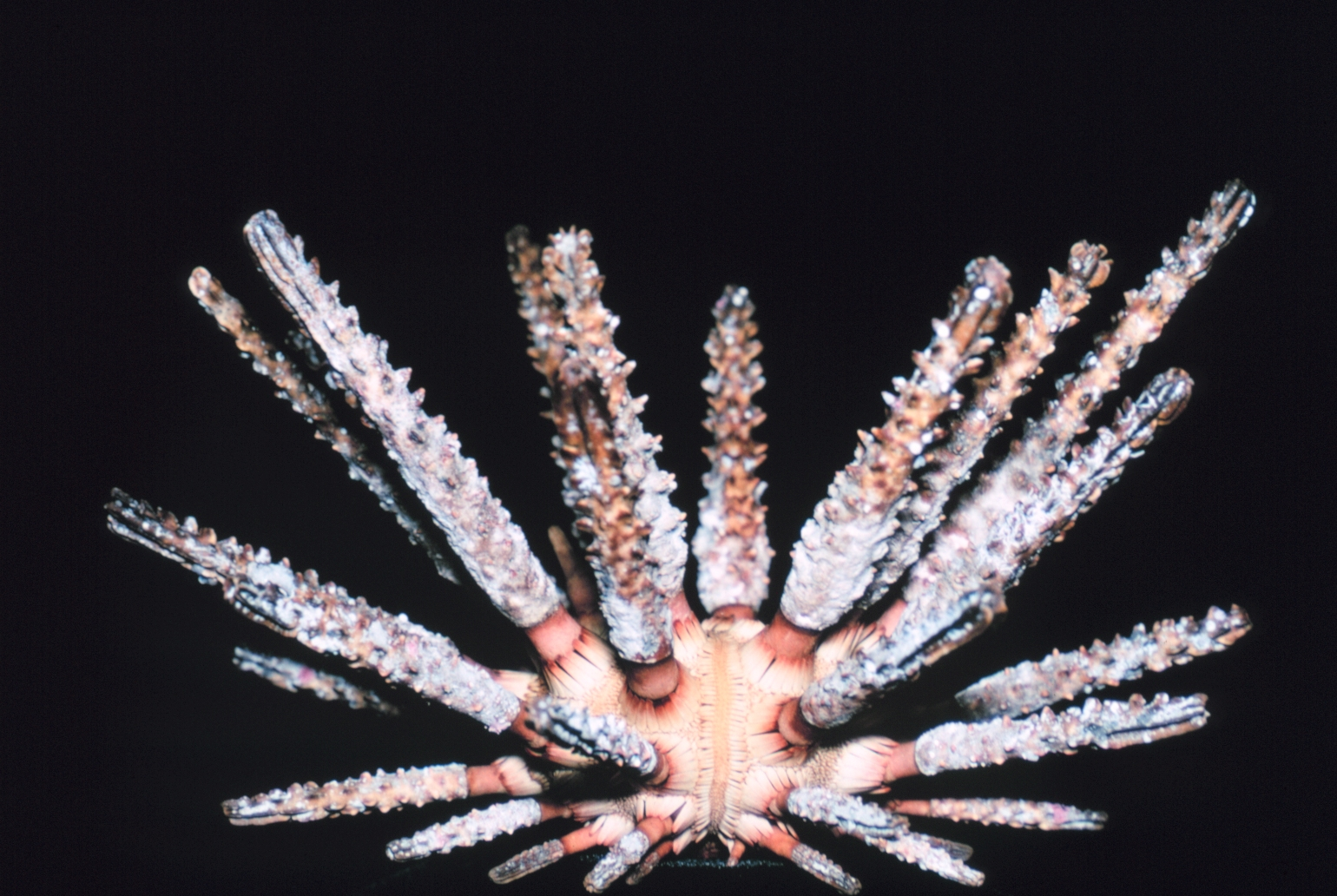

Scientific classification
- Kingdom: Animalia
- Phylum: Echinodermata
- Class: Echinoidea
- Order: Cidaroida
- Family: Cidaridae
- Genus: Chondrocidaris
- Species: C. gigantea

Binomial name
- Chondrocidaris gigantea A. Agassiz, 1863

Synonyms
- Leiocidaris gigantea (A. Agassiz, 1863); Phyllacanthus gigantea (A. Agassiz, 1863); Rhabdocidaris gigantea (A. Agassiz, 1863)

= Chondrocidaris gigantea =

Species of sea urchins

Chondrocidaris gigantea, also known as the rough-spined urchin or blade-tipped tiara-urchin, is a species of sea urchin of the family Cidaridae. Chondrocidaris gigantea was first scientifically described in 1863 by Alexander Agassiz.

== Description ==
Chondrocidaris gigantea grows to between 20 and 25 cm (8 and 10 in) in diameter, with each of its spines reaching 15 cm (6 in) in length. Its spines contain thorns, allowing for the growth of algae and sponges. In turn, the algae and sponges that grow provide camouflage for the sea urchin. The amount of spines found on this species can vary depending on region, for example those found in Mauritius only have 5 spines while those in Hawaii may have up to 10. The rough-spined sea urchin is primarily a herbivore, with most of its diet consisting of the algae that form on the coral reefs.

== Distribution and habitat ==
The rough-spined sea urchin can be found in the Central Pacific, including Hawaii, New Guinea and French Polynesia, as well as in Mauritius. It prefers coral reefs in water depths deeper than 150 ft (46 m). using the surrounding coral as cover.
