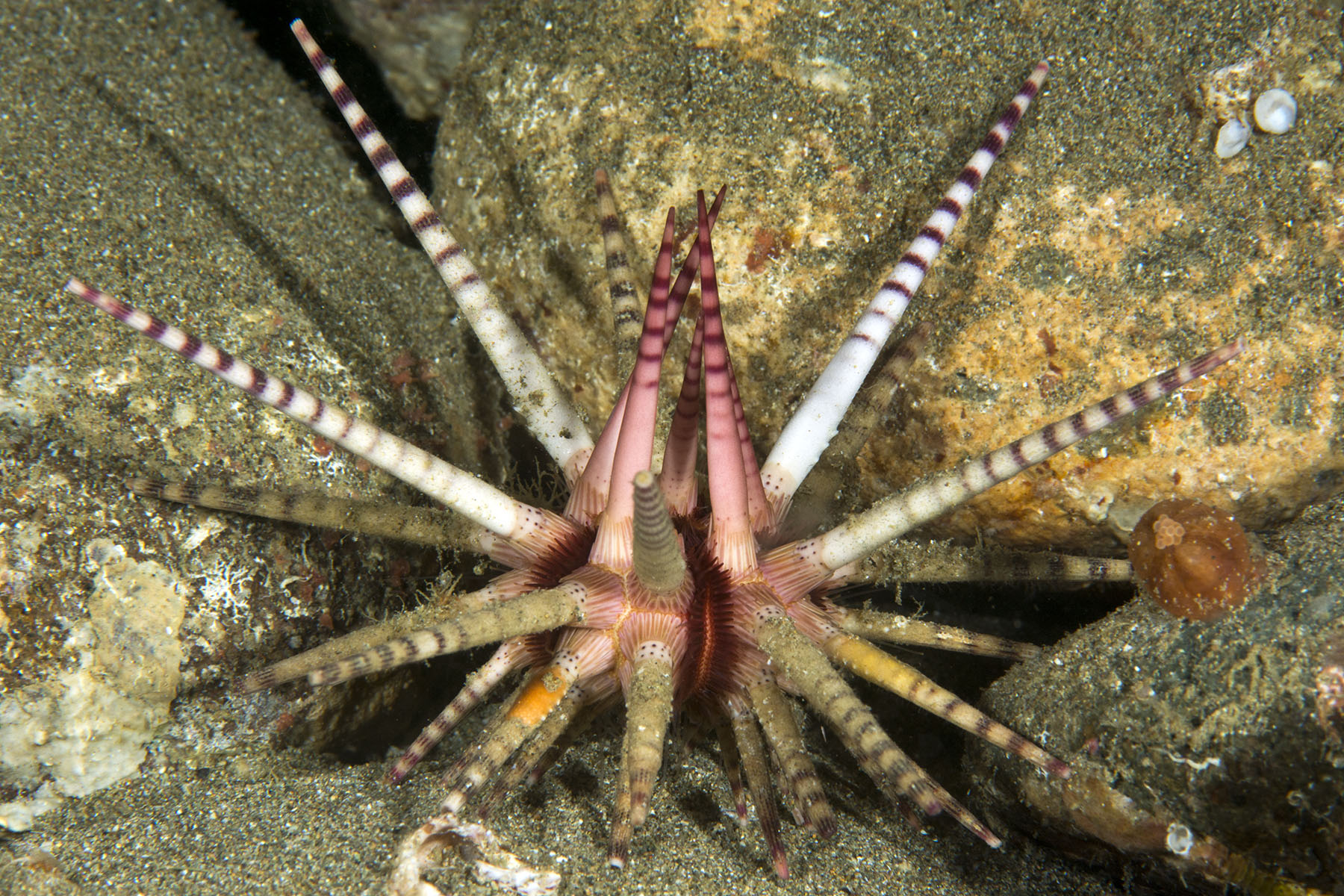
- Prionocidaris baculosa

Scientific classification
- Kingdom: Animalia
- Phylum: Echinodermata
- Class: Echinoidea
- Order: Cidaroida
- Family: Cidaridae
- Subfamily: Stylocidarinae
- Genus: Prionocidaris; Agassiz, 1863

= Prionocidaris =

Genus of sea urchins

Prionocidaris is a genus of echinoderms belonging to the family Cidaridae.

The genus has almost cosmopolitan distribution.

Species:

- Prionocidaris anacachoensis Thompson, 2016
- Prionocidaris australis (Ramsay, 1885)
- Prionocidaris baculosa (Lamarck, 1816)
- Prionocidaris bispinosa (Lamarck, 1816)
- Prionocidaris callista Rowe & Hoggett, 1986
- Prionocidaris cookei Cutress, 1976
- Prionocidaris glandulosa (De Meijere, 1904)
- Prionocidaris haasti Fell, 1954
- Prionocidaris hawaiiensis (A. Agassiz & H.L. Clark, 1907)
- Prionocidaris katherinae Cutress, 1980
- Prionocidaris malindiensis Stephenson, 1968
- Prionocidaris marchalli Fell, 1954
- Prionocidaris neglecta Smith & Wright, 1989
- Prionocidaris pawpawensis Thompson, 2016
- Prionocidaris pistillaris (Lamarck, 1816)
- Prionocidaris popeae Hoggett & Rowe, 1986
- Prionocidaris praeverticillata Stephenson, 1968
- Prionocidaris scoparia Chapman & Cudmore, 1934
- Prionocidaris thomasi (A. Agassiz & H.L. Clark, 1907)
