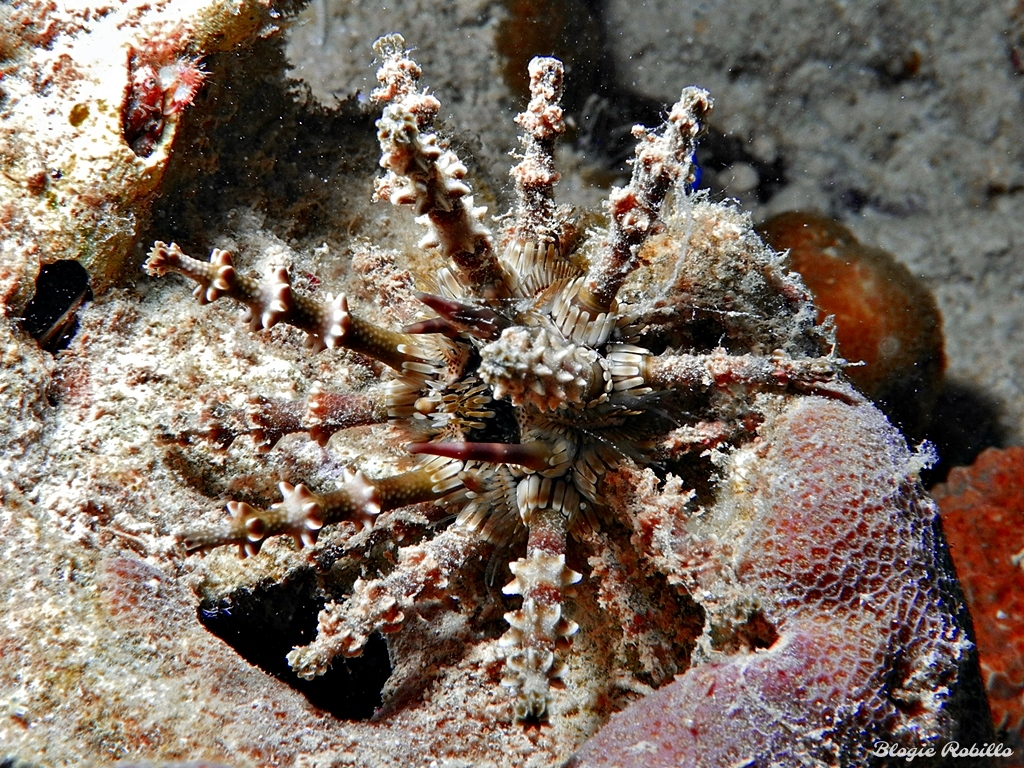
- Plococidaris verticillata

Scientific classification
- Kingdom: Animalia
- Phylum: Echinodermata
- Class: Echinoidea
- Order: Cidaroida
- Family: Cidaridae
- Subfamily: Stylocidarinae
- Genus: Plococidaris; Mortensen, 1909
- Species: P. verticillata

Binomial name
- Plococidaris verticillata (Lamarck, 1816)

= Plococidaris =

Genus of sea urchins

Plococidaris is a monotypic genus of echinoderms belonging to the family Cidaridae. The only species is Plococidaris verticillata.

The species is found in Malesia and Indian Ocean.
