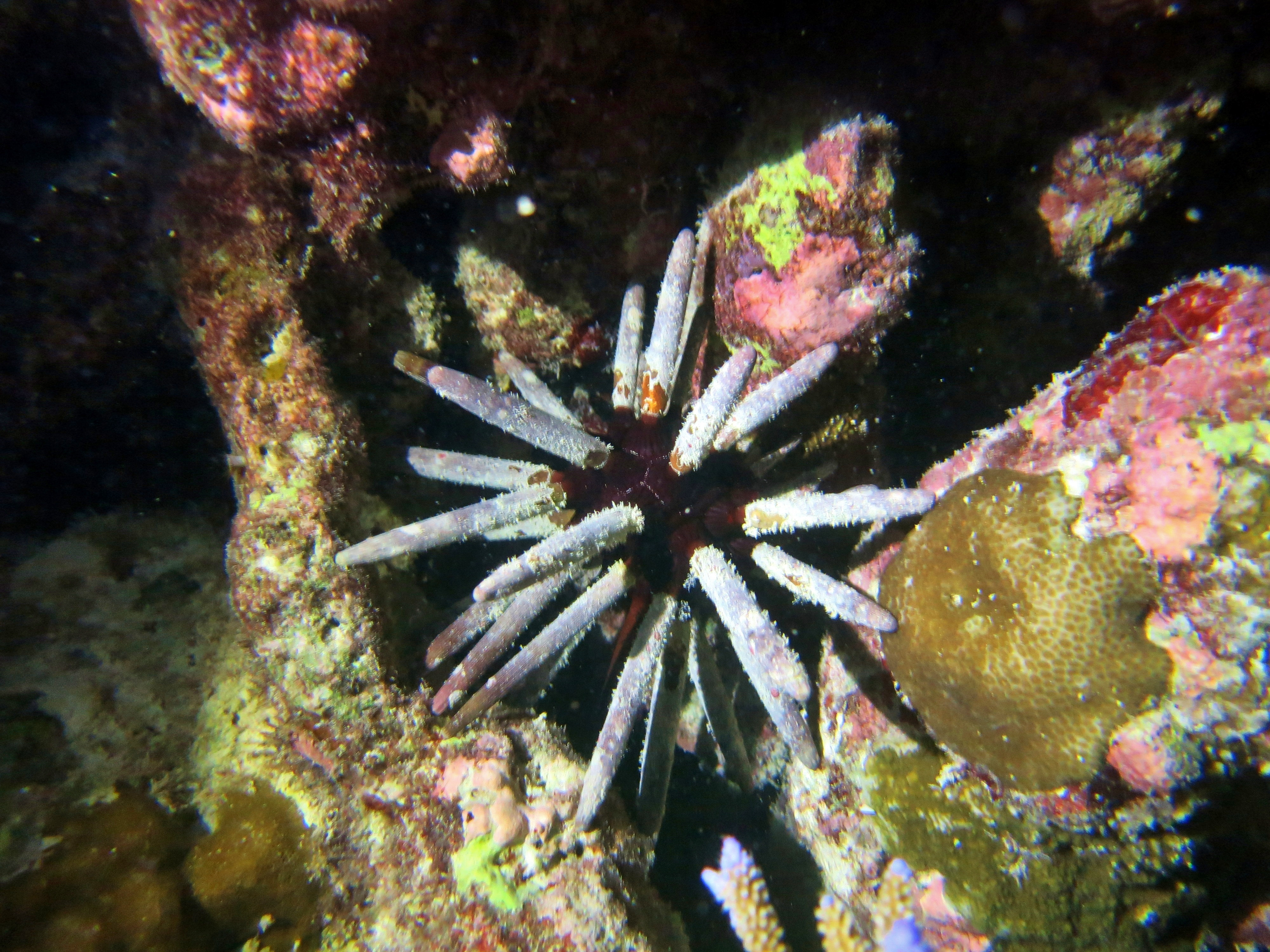

Scientific classification
- Kingdom: Animalia
- Phylum: Echinodermata
- Class: Echinoidea
- Order: Cidaroida
- Family: Cidaridae
- Genus: Phyllacanthus
- Species: P. imperialis

Binomial name
- Phyllacanthus imperialis (Lamarck, 1816)

Synonyms
- Cidaris fustigera (Agassiz, 1963); Cidaris imperialis (Lamarck, 1816); Cidaris imperialis fustigera (Agassiz, 1863); Cidarites imperialis Lamarck, 1816; Leiocidaris imperialis (Lamarck, 1816); Phyllacanthus fustigera Agassiz, 1863; Phyllacanthus fustigerus Agassiz, 1863; Rhabdocidaris imperialis (Lamarck, 1816)

= Phyllacanthus imperialis =

Species of sea urchin

Phyllacanthus imperialis, also known as the Sputnik urchin, imperial lance urchin, imperial sea urchin, imperial urchin, pencil sea urchin, lance urchin, knobby sputnik sea urchin, mine urchin, and land mine sea urchin, is a species of sea urchins in the family Cidaridae.

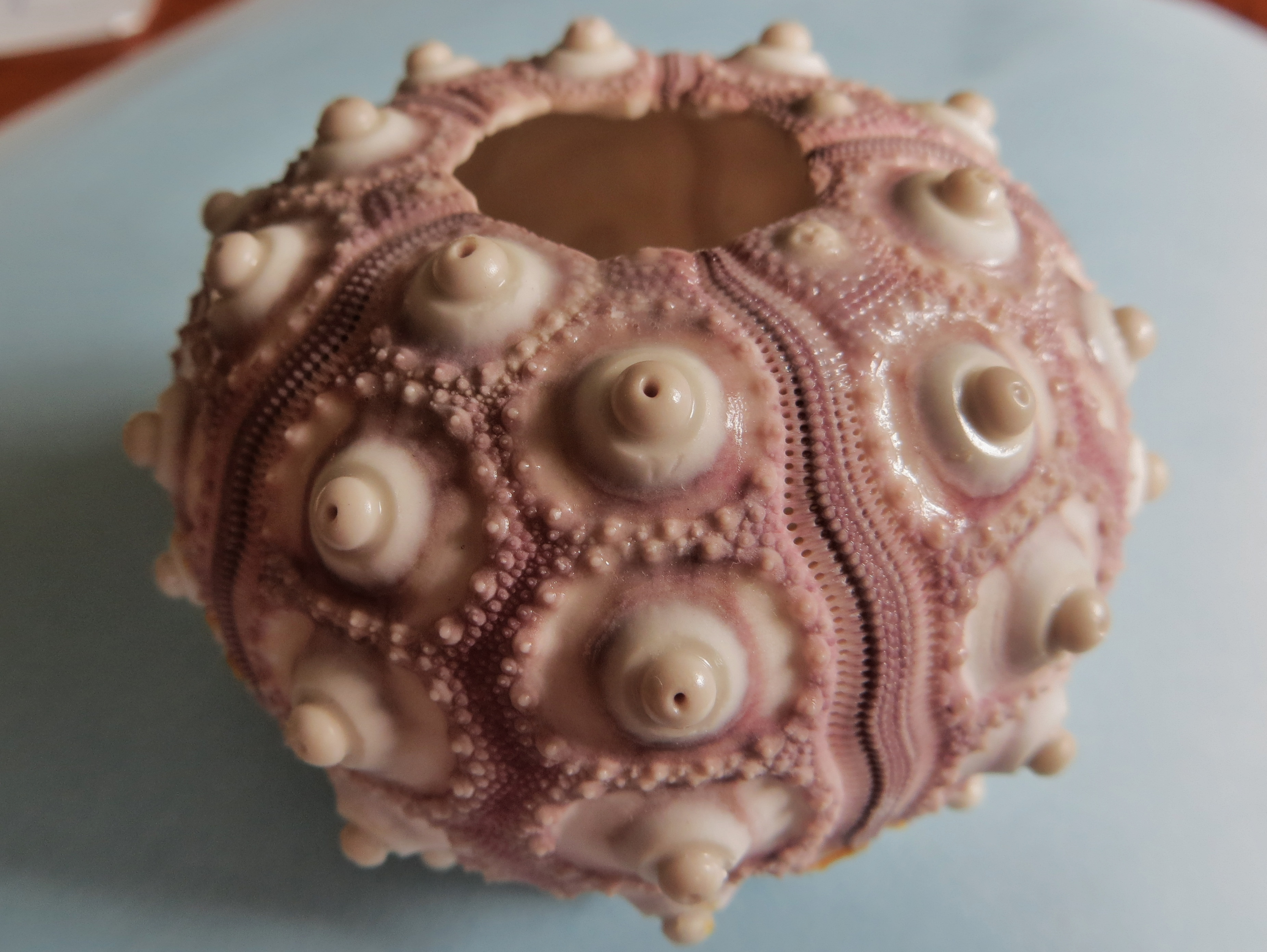
Test (shell)

It has distinctive thick, blunt spikes. The test is brown or black. The spikes vary in color. This species emerges at night to eat invertebrates and sponges. During the day, it tends to remain hidden in holes in the coral reef. Phyllacanthus imperialis is found throughout the Indo-Pacific region.
