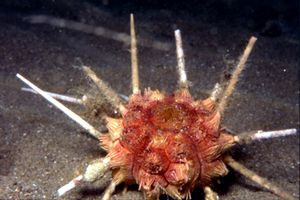

Scientific classification
- Domain: Eukaryota
- Kingdom: Animalia
- Phylum: Echinodermata
- Class: Echinoidea
- Order: Cidaroida
- Family: Cidaridae
- Genus: Stylocidaris
- Species: S. affinis

Binomial name
- Stylocidaris affinis Philippi, 1845

Synonyms
- Cidaris affinis Philippi, 1845; Cidaris stokesii L. Agassiz in L. Agassiz & Desor, 1846; Leiocidaris affinis (Philippi, 1845); Leiocidaris stokesii (L. Agassiz in L. Agassiz & Desor, 1846); Orthocidaris affinis (Philippi, 1845); Tretocidaris affinis (Philippi, 1845)

= Stylocidaris affinis =

Species of sea urchin

Stylocidaris affinis, also known as pencil urchin or red lance urchin, is a species of sea urchin.

It can be found in Bermuda, Caribbean Sea, Gulf Of Mexico, and the Mediterranean Sea. It occurs on circalittoral and deep sedimentary bottoms near Malta.
