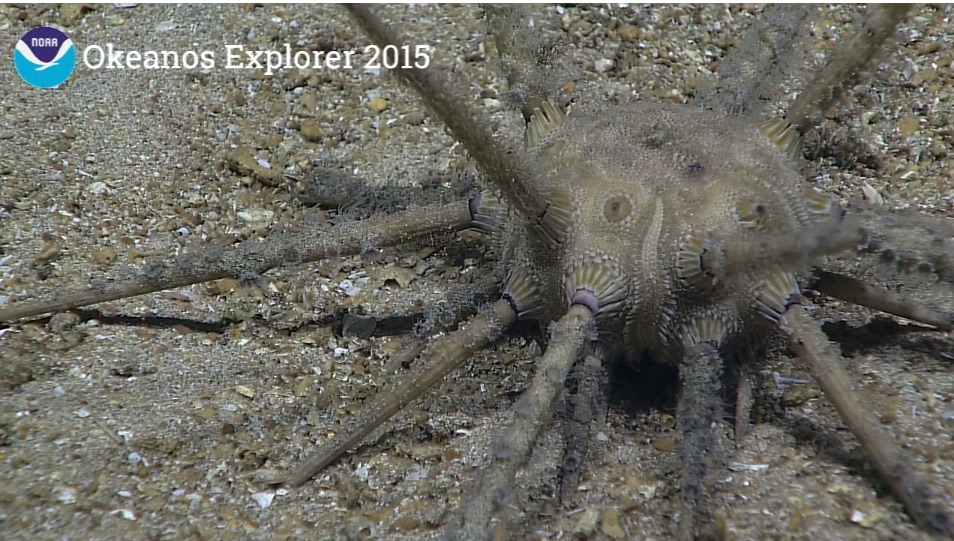
- Stereocidaris hawaiiensis

Scientific classification
- Kingdom: Animalia
- Phylum: Echinodermata
- Class: Echinoidea
- Order: Cidaroida
- Family: Cidaridae
- Subfamily: Stereocidarinae
- Genus: Stereocidaris; Pomel, 1883

= Stereocidaris =

Genus of sea urchins

Stereocidaris is a genus of echinoderm belonging to the family Cidaridae.

The genus has almost cosmopolitan distribution.

Species:

- Stereocidaris alcocki (Anderson, 1894)
- Stereocidaris baileyi Fell, 1962
- Stereocidaris bolli Krenkel, 1928
- Stereocidaris canaliculata (Duncan & Sladen)
- Stereocidaris capensis Döderlein, 1901
- Stereocidaris cudmorei Philip, 1964
- Stereocidaris destefanii Innocenti, 1924
- Stereocidaris excavata Mortensen, 1932
- Stereocidaris fosteri Philip, 1964
- Stereocidaris grandis (Döderlein, 1885)
- Stereocidaris granularis Mortensen, 1928
- Stereocidaris hawaiiensis Mortensen, 1928
- Stereocidaris hispida Philip, 1964
- Stereocidaris hudspethensis Cooke, 1955
- Stereocidaris hutchinsoni Fell, 1954
- Stereocidaris indica Döderlein, 1901
- Stereocidaris inermis Philip, 1964
- Stereocidaris ingolfiana Mortensen, 1903
- Stereocidaris intricata Philip, 1964
- Stereocidaris jaekeli Krenkel, 1928
- Stereocidaris keertii Smith, 2010
- Stereocidaris leucacantha A. Agassiz & H.L. Clark, 1907
- Stereocidaris microtuberculata (Yoshiwara, 1898)
- Stereocidaris monilifera (Goldfuss, 1826)
- Stereocidaris nascaensis Allison, Durham & Mintz, 1967
- Stereocidaris opipara (Duncan & Sladen)
- Stereocidaris purpurascens Mortensen, 1928
- Stereocidaris reducta Mortensen, 1939
- Stereocidaris rugensis Krenkel, 1928
- Stereocidaris sarracenarum (Fourtau, 1921)
- Stereocidaris sceptriferoides (Döderlein, 1887)
- Stereocidaris squamosa Mortensen, 1928
- Stereocidaris stylifera Mortensen, 1928
- Stereocidaris sulcatispinis Mortensen, 1928
- Stereocidaris trigonodus Aziz, 1991
- Stereocidaris tubifera Mortensen, 1928
