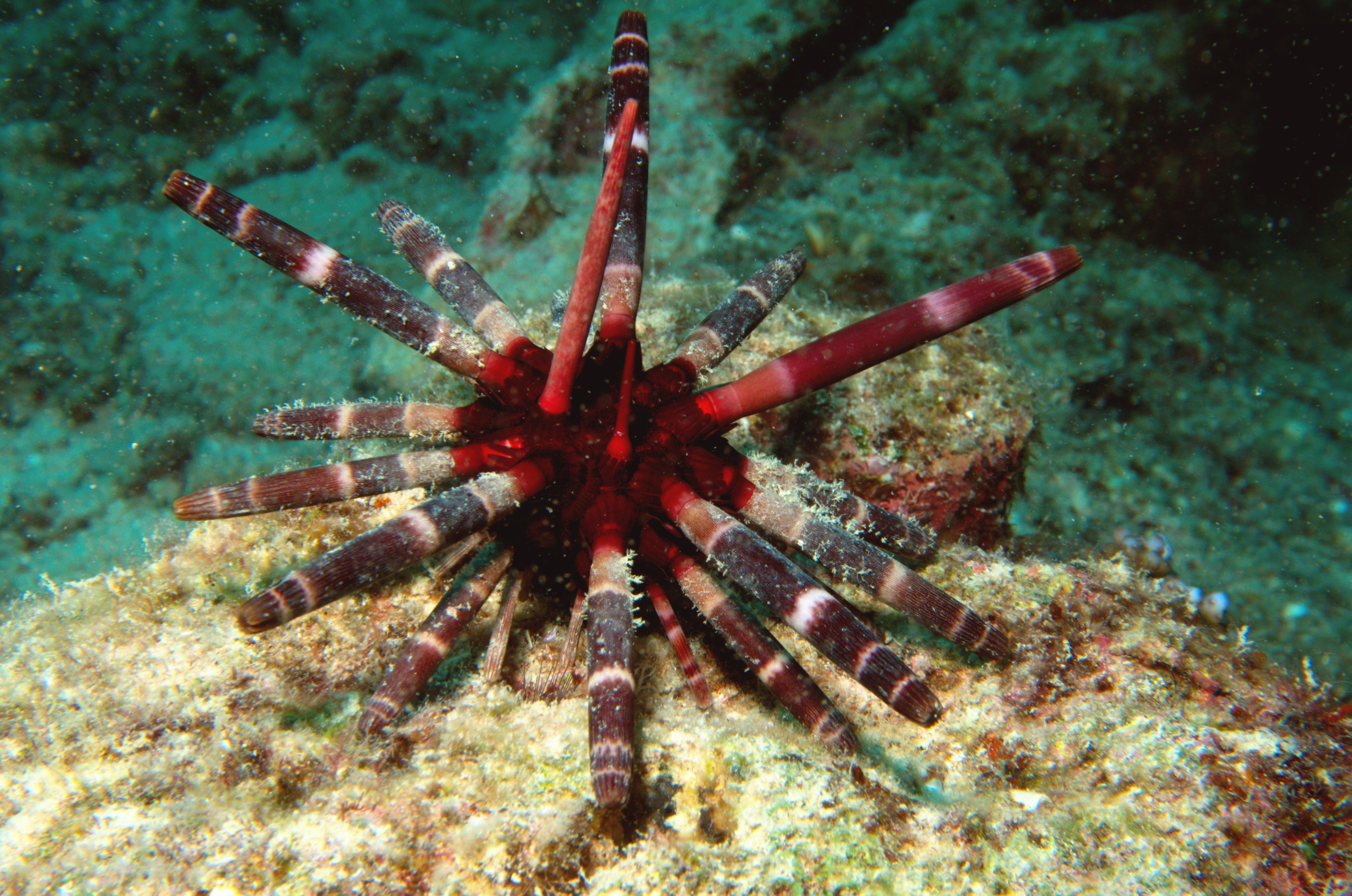
- Phyllacanthus imperialis

Scientific classification
- Kingdom: Animalia
- Phylum: Echinodermata
- Class: Echinoidea
- Order: Cidaroida
- Family: Cidaridae
- Genus: Phyllacanthus; Brandt, 1835

= Phyllacanthus =

Genus of sea urchins

Phyllacanthus is a genus of echinoderms belonging to the family Cidaridae.

The genus has almost cosmopolitan distribution.

Species:

- Phyllacanthus clarkii Chapman & Cudmore, 1934
- Phyllacanthus dubius (Brandt, 1835)
- Phyllacanthus duncani Chapman & Cudmore, 1934
- Phyllacanthus forcipulatus Mortensen, 1936
- Phyllacanthus imperialis (Lamarck, 1816)
- Phyllacanthus irregularis Mortensen, 1928
- Phyllacanthus javanus Martin, 1885
- Phyllacanthus longispinus Mortensen, 1918
- Phyllacanthus magnificus H.L. Clark, 1914
- Phyllacanthus parvispinus Tenison-Woods, 1878
- Phyllacanthus priscus Brito & Ramires, 1974
- Phyllacanthus serratus Philip, 1963
- Phyllacanthus suleimani (Noetling, 1897)
- Phyllacanthus texanus Whitney & Kellum, 1966
- Phyllacanthus titan Fell, 1954
- Phyllacanthus tylotus H.L. Clark, 1945
- Phyllacanthus tysoni Whitney & Kellum, 1966
- Phyllacanthus wellmanae Fell, 1954
