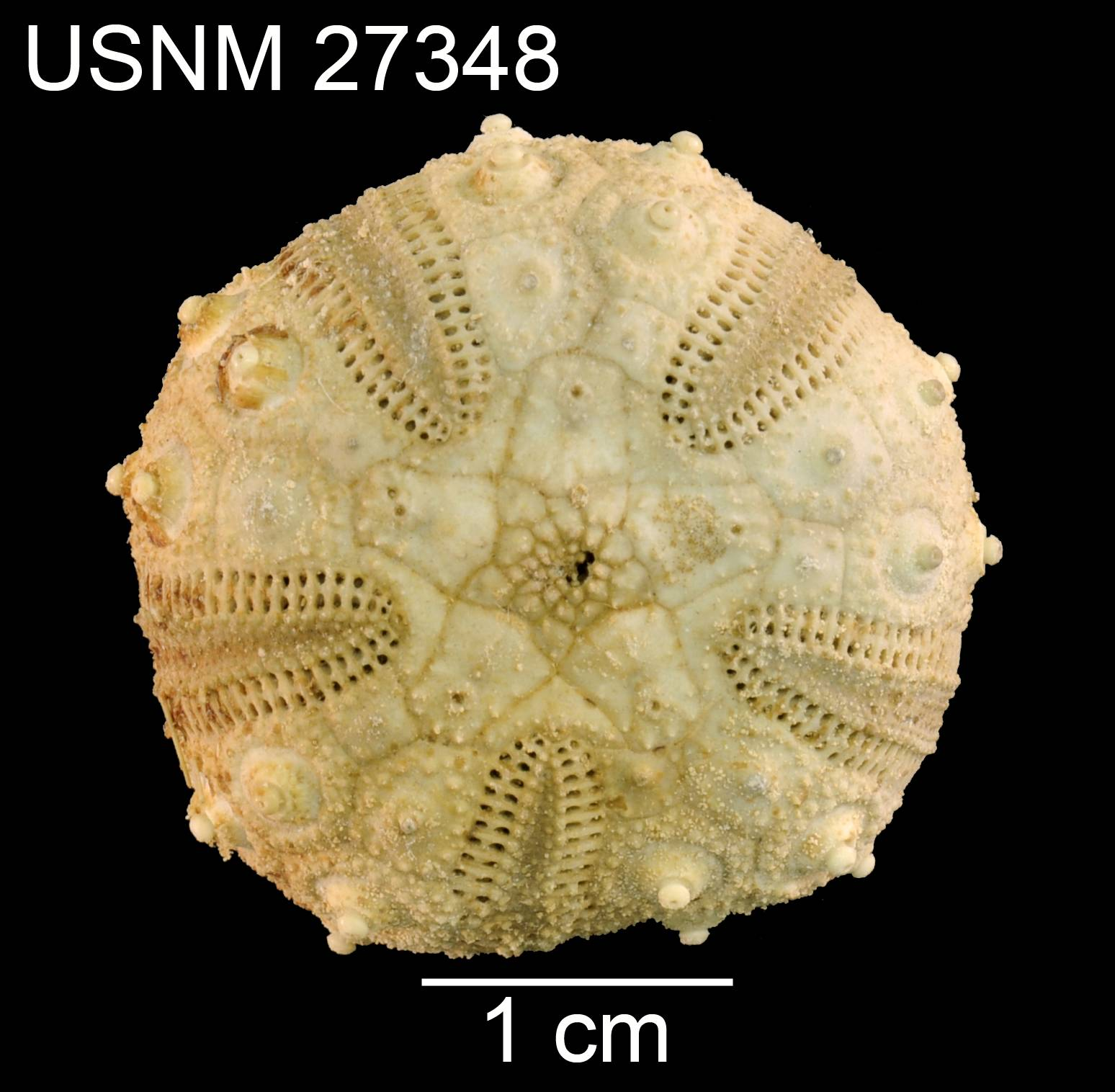
- Goniocidaris doederleini

Scientific classification
- Kingdom: Animalia
- Phylum: Echinodermata
- Class: Echinoidea
- Order: Cidaroida
- Family: Cidaridae
- Subfamily: Cidarinae
- Genus: Centrocidaris; Agassiz, 1904
- Species: C. doederleini

Binomial name
- Centrocidaris doederleini (Agassiz, 1898)

= Centrocidaris =

Genus of sea urchin

Centrocidaris is a monotypic genus of sea urchins belonging to the family Cidaridae. The only species is Centrocidaris doederleini. Their armour is covered with spines. Centrocidaris doederleini was first scientifically described in 1898 by Alexander Agassiz.

The species is found in the Caribbean.
