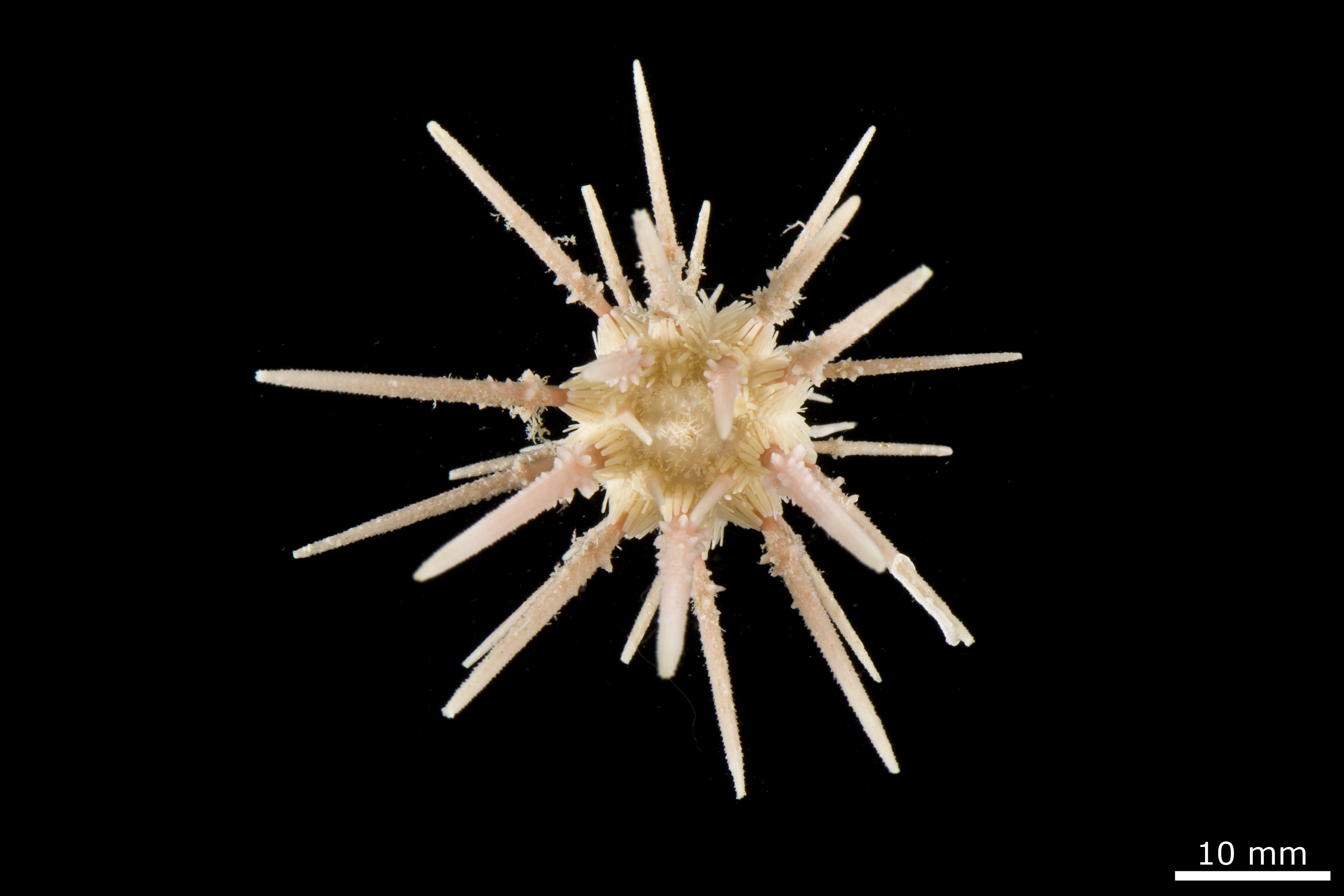
- Austrocidaris spinulosa

Scientific classification
- Kingdom: Animalia
- Phylum: Echinodermata
- Class: Echinoidea
- Order: Cidaroida
- Family: Cidaridae
- Subfamily: Goniocidarinae
- Genus: Austrocidaris; Clark, 1907

= Austrocidaris =

Genus of sea urchins

Austrocidaris is a genus of sea urchins belonging to the family Cidaridae.

The species of this genus are found in southernmost America and New Zealand.

Species:

- Austrocidaris canaliculata (Agassiz, 1863)
- Austrocidaris lorioli (Mortensen, 1903)
- Austrocidaris operta Philip, 1964
- Austrocidaris pawsoni McKnight, 1974
- Austrocidaris seymourensis Radwańska, 1996
- Austrocidaris spinulosa Mortensen, 1910
