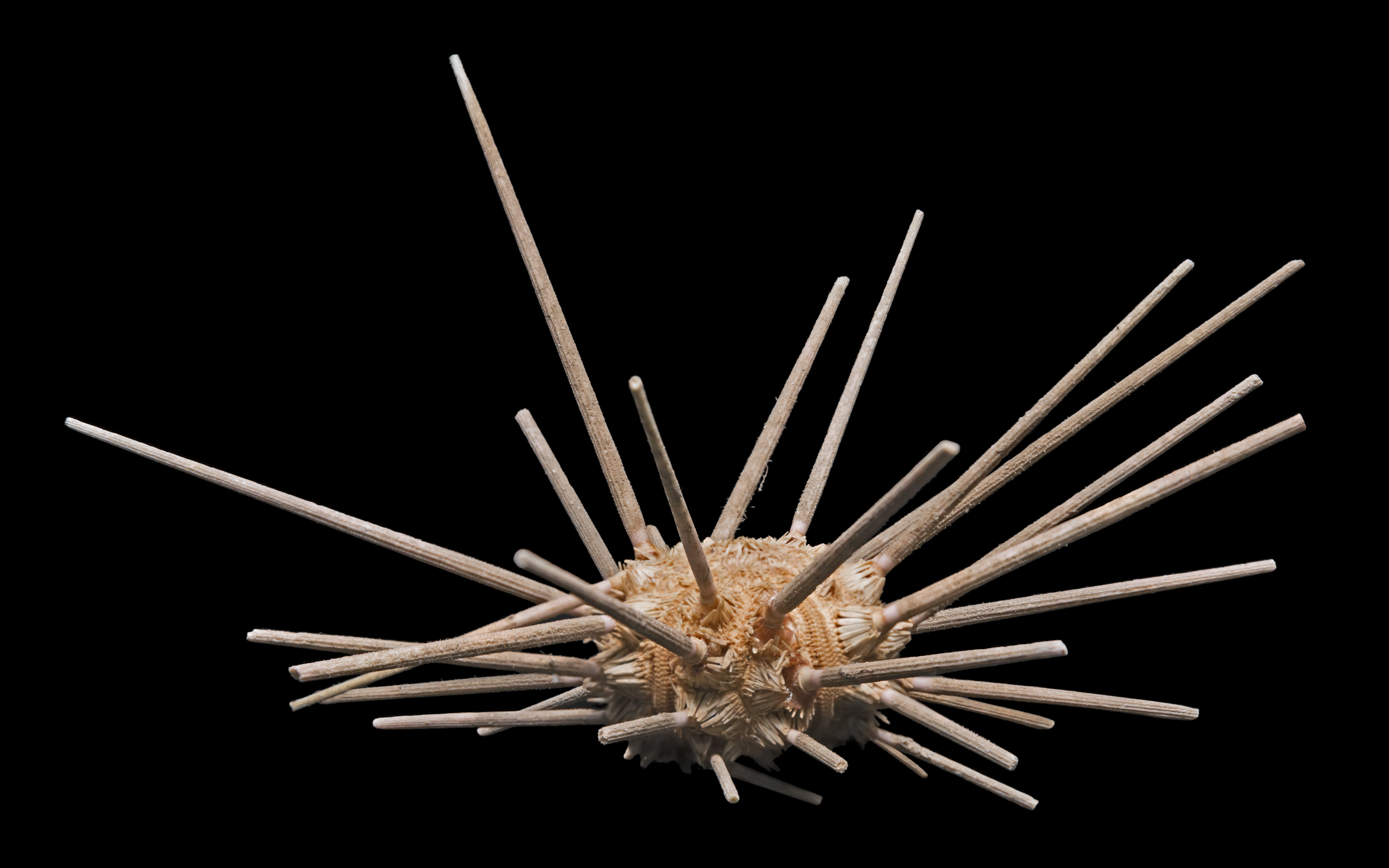
- Cidaris cidaris

Scientific classification
- Kingdom: Animalia
- Phylum: Echinodermata
- Class: Echinoidea
- Order: Cidaroida
- Superfamily: Cidaroidea
- Family: Cidaridae; Gray, 1825

Genera
- See text

= Cidaridae =

Cidaridae Temporal range: Lower Permian–Recent

Family of sea urchins

Cidaridae is a family of sea urchins in the order Cidaroida.

== Description and characteristics ==
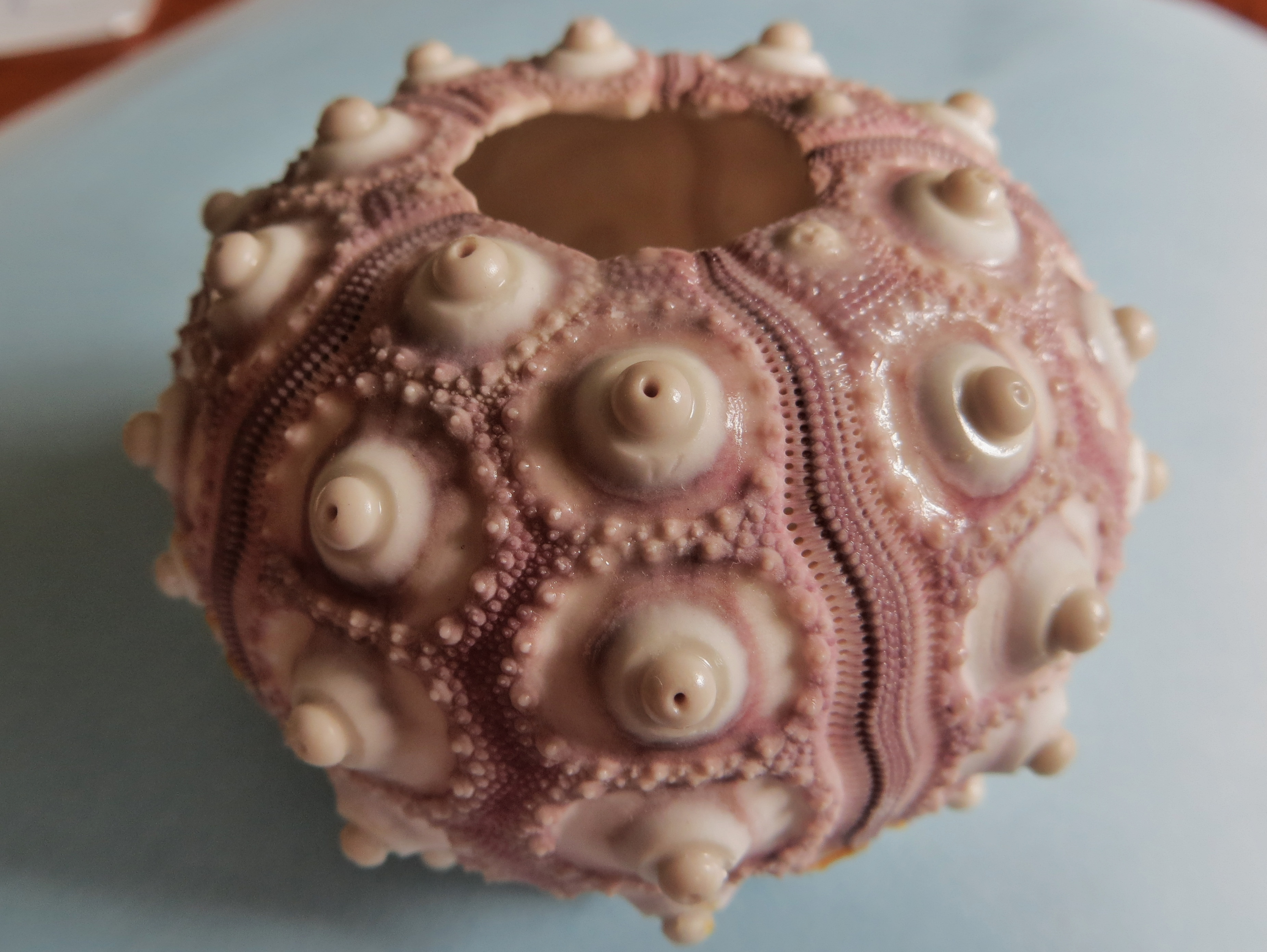
Typical test of a cidarid sea urchin (Phyllacanthus imperialis).

Cidarid sea urchins are characterized by their stout skeleton : the test is thick and hard, with massive perforated tubercles (never crenulated) surrounded by a crown of secondary tubercles, but no primary tubercles in the interambulacra regions. These tubercles hold massive spines, thick, strong and often very long, and showing sometimes odd shapes (thorny spines, fans, clubs, Christmas trees...).

The order Cidaroida is the basalmost of current sea urchins, and most of the species included in this family are abyssal, even if a handful of species remain quite common in tropical shallow waters, like Eucidaris or Phyllacanthus.

== Genera ==
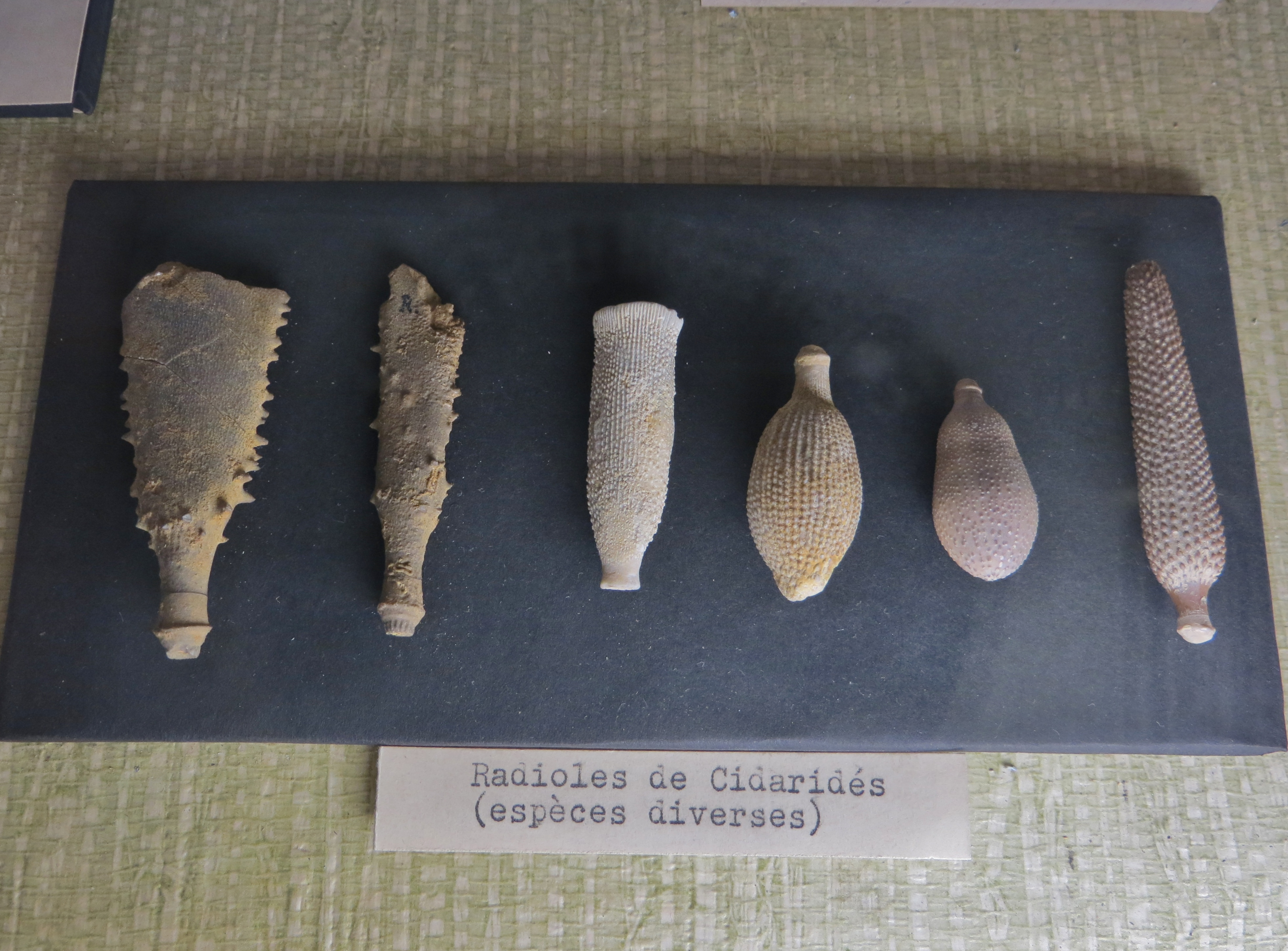
Primary spines from the family Cidaridae

According to the World Register of Marine Species (WoRMS), the following genera are included in this family

- Subfamily Cidarinae (Mortensen, 1928a)
  - Genus Calocidaris (H.L. Clark, 1907)
  - Genus Centrocidaris (A. Agassiz, 1904)
  - Genus Chondrocidaris (A. Agassiz, 1863)
  - Genus Chorocidaris (Ikeda, 1941)
  - Genus Cidaris (Leske, 1778)
  - Genus Compsocidaris (Ikeda, 1939)
  - Genus Eucidaris (Pomel, 1883)
  - Genus Hesperocidaris (Mortensen, 1928b)
  - Genus Kionocidaris (Mortensen, 1932)
  - Genus Lissocidaris (Mortensen, 1939)
  - Genus Tretocidaris (Mortensen, 1903b)
- Subfamily Goniocidarinae (Mortensen, 1928a)
  - Genus Austrocidaris (H.L. Clark, 1907)
  - Genus Goniocidaris (Desor, in Agassiz & Desor, 1846)
  - Genus Ogmocidaris (Mortensen, 1921)
  - Genus Psilocidaris (Mortensen, 1927)
  - Genus Rhopalocidaris (Mortensen, 1927)
  - Genus Schizocidaris (Mortensen, 1903b)
  - Genus Adelcidaris (Cotton & Godfrey, 1942) (nomen dubium)
- Tribe Phyllacanthina (Smith & Wright, 1989)
  - Genus Phyllacanthus (Brandt, 1835)
- Subfamily Stereocidarinae (Lambert, 1900)
  - Genus Phalacrocidaris (Lambert, 1902)
  - Genus Stereocidaris (Pomel, 1883)
- Subfamily Stylocidarinae (Mortensen, 1903)
  - Genus Acanthocidaris (Mortensen, 1903b)
  - Genus Plococidaris (Mortensen, 1909)
  - Genus Prionocidaris (A. Agassiz, 1863)
  - Genus Stylocidaris (Mortensen, 1909)

A now abandoned genus, Cidarites was used in the late 18th and early 19th century to describe a number of species of both cidarid and echid sea urchins.

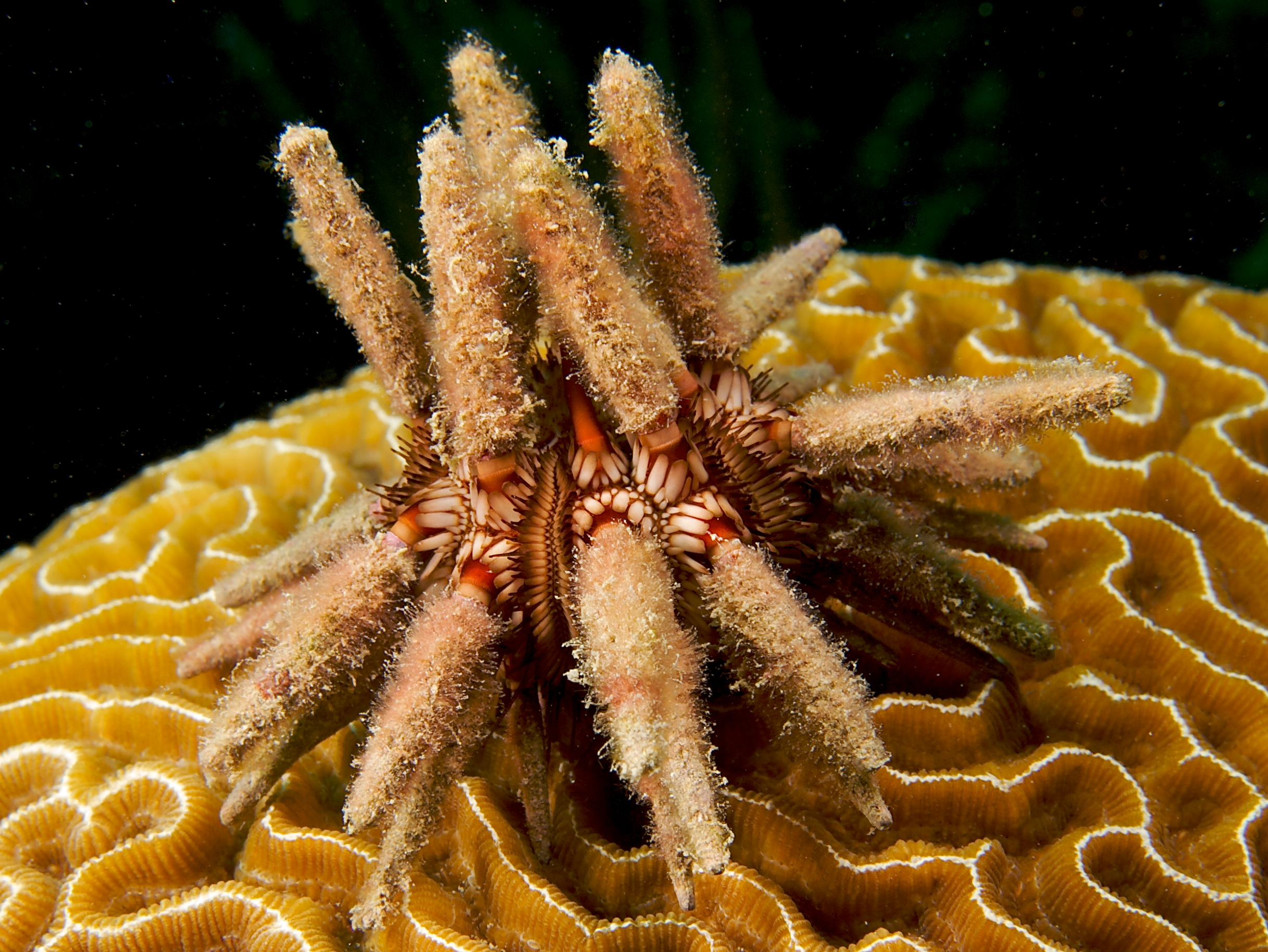
Eucidaris tribuloides.

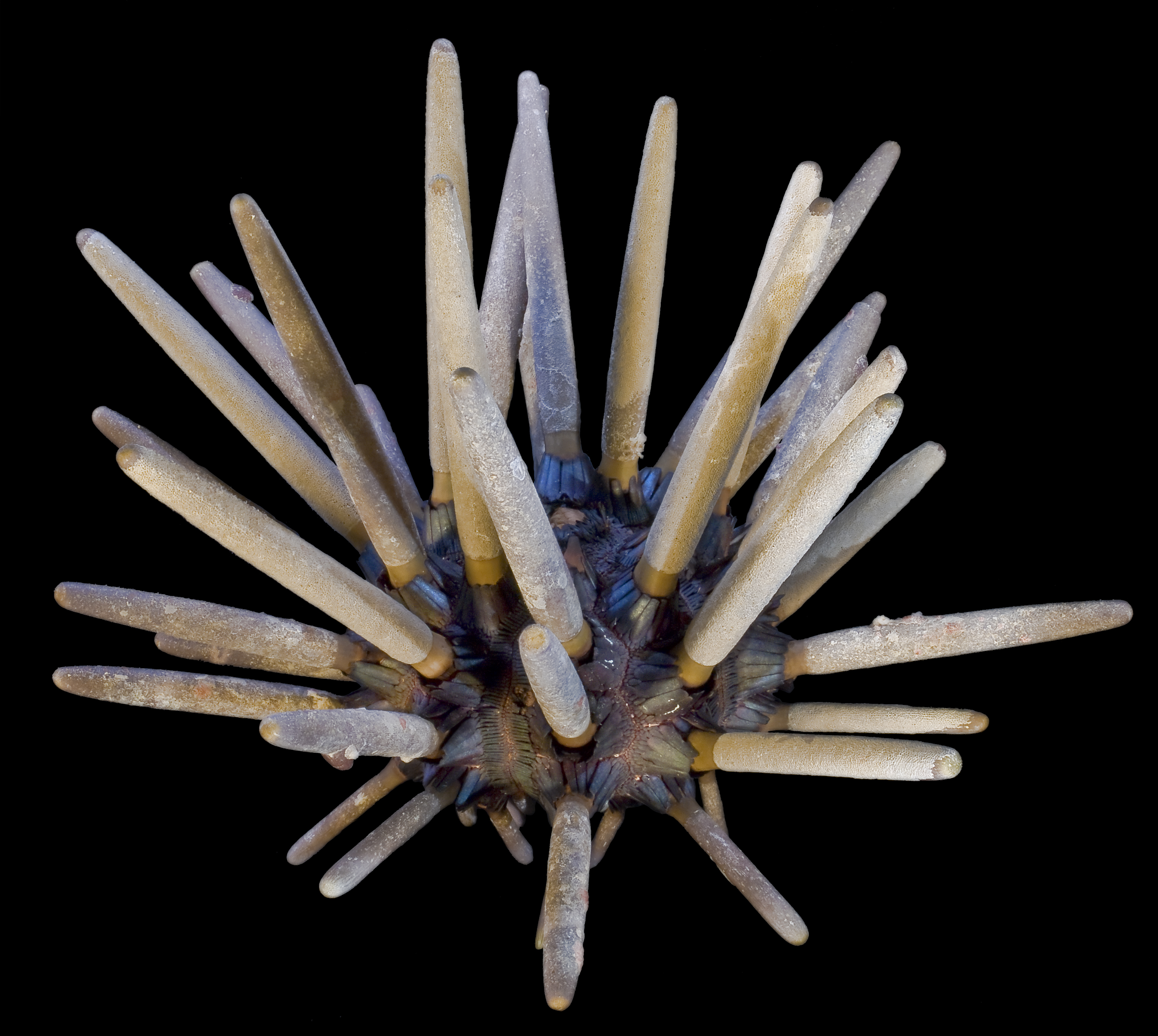
Phyllacanthus imperialis

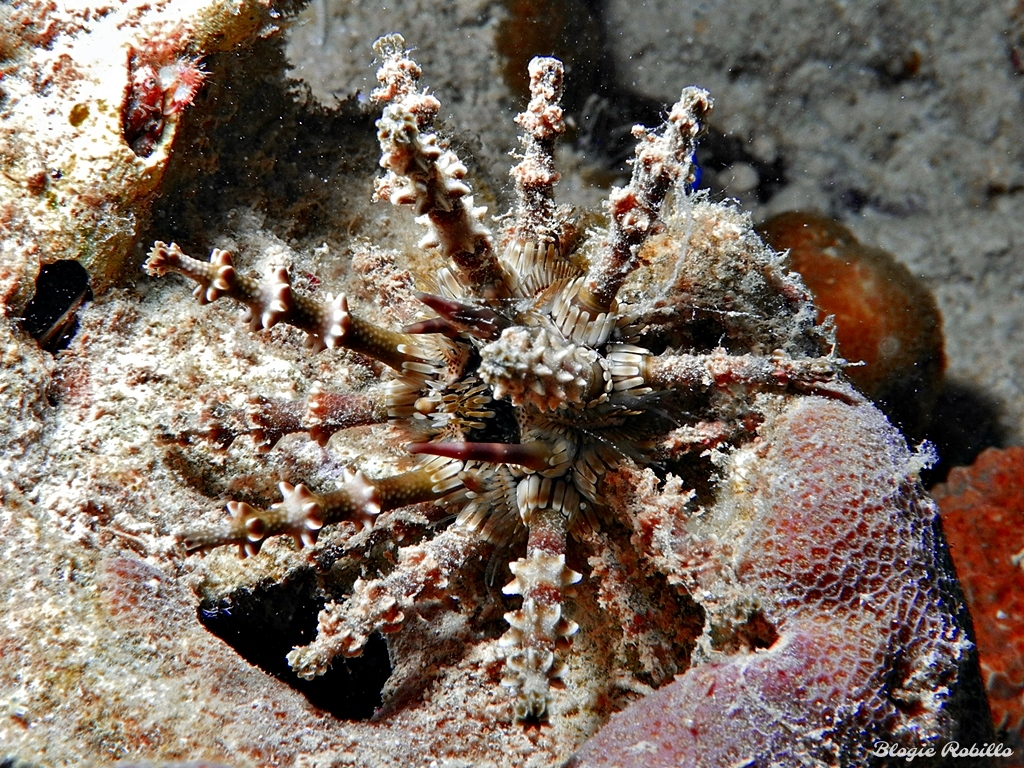
Plococidaris verticillata

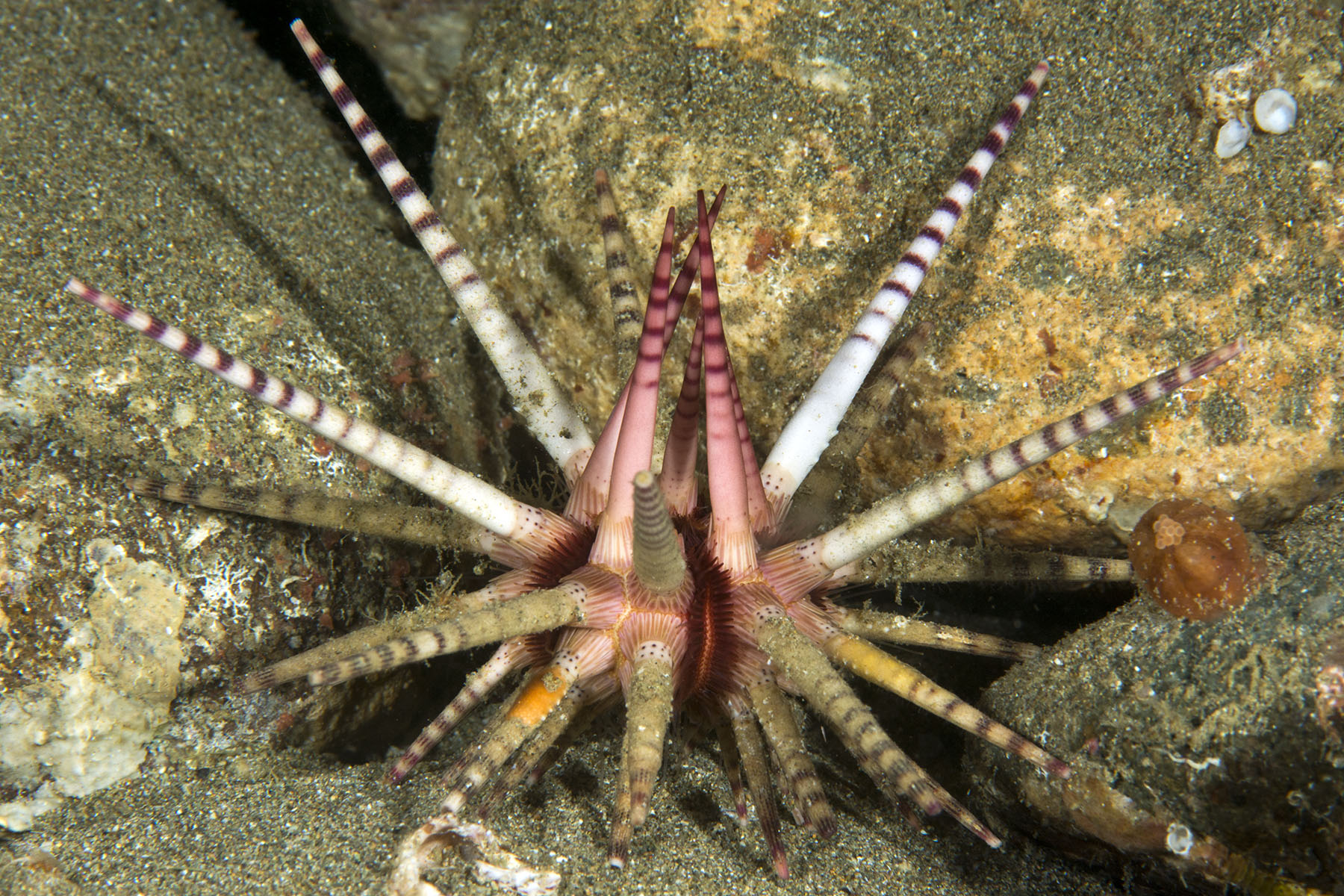
Prionocidaris baculosa, from Philippines

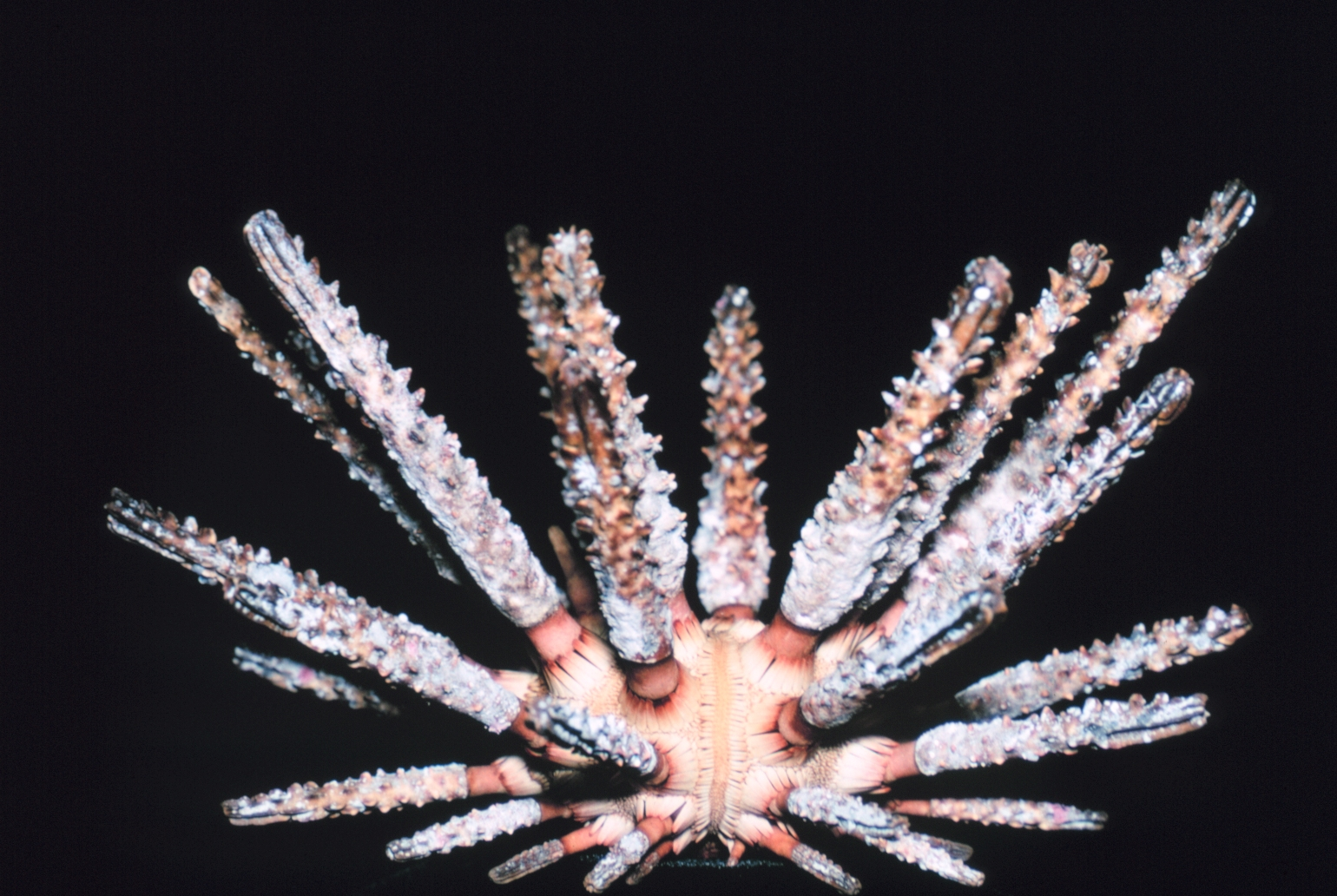
Chondrocidaris gigantea, from Hawaii

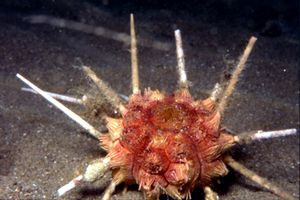
Stylocidaris affinis

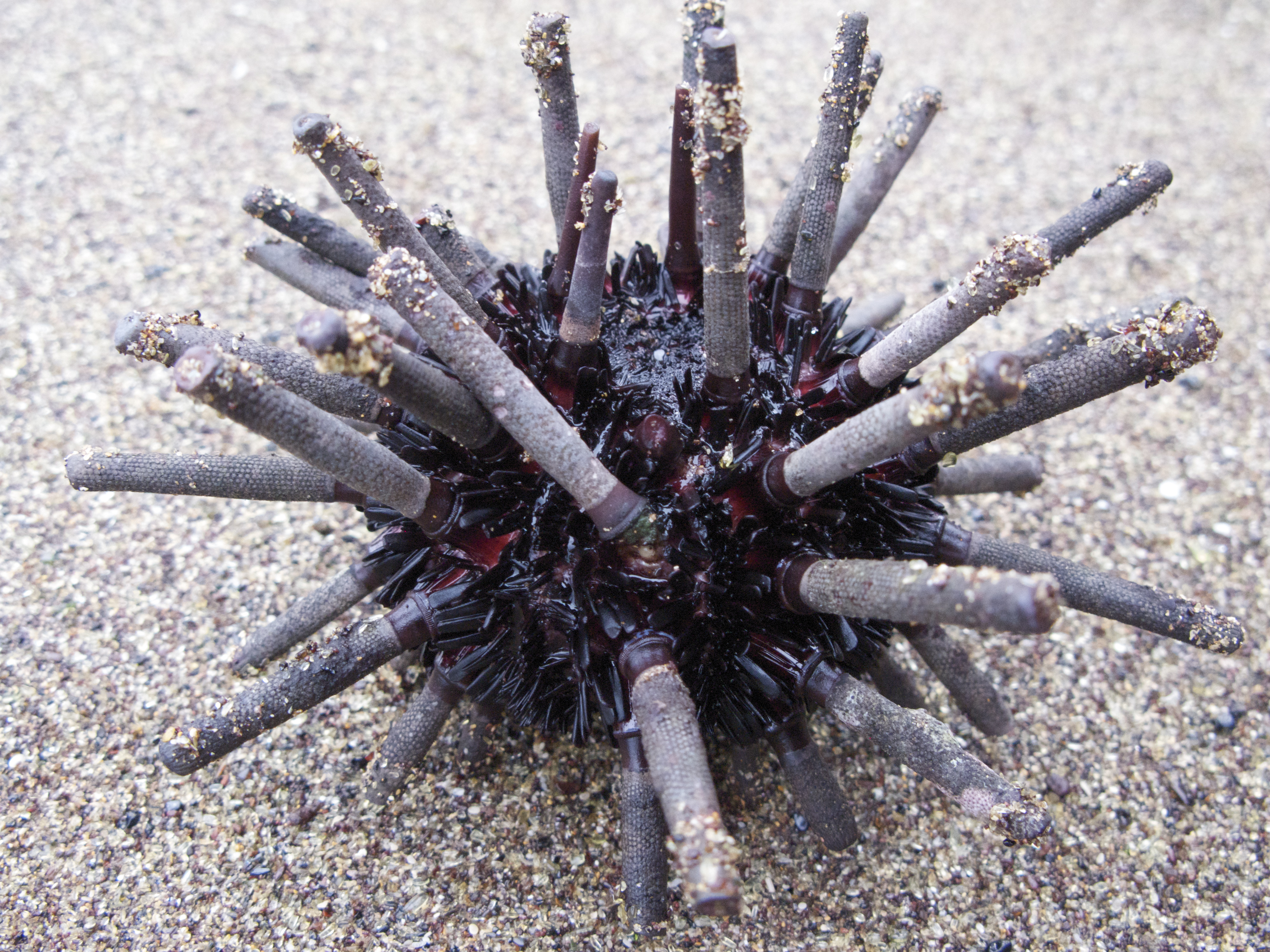
Eucidaris galapagensis

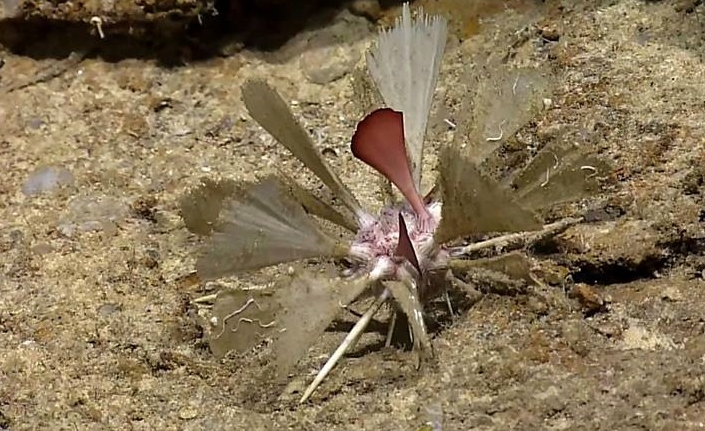
Cidaris blakei

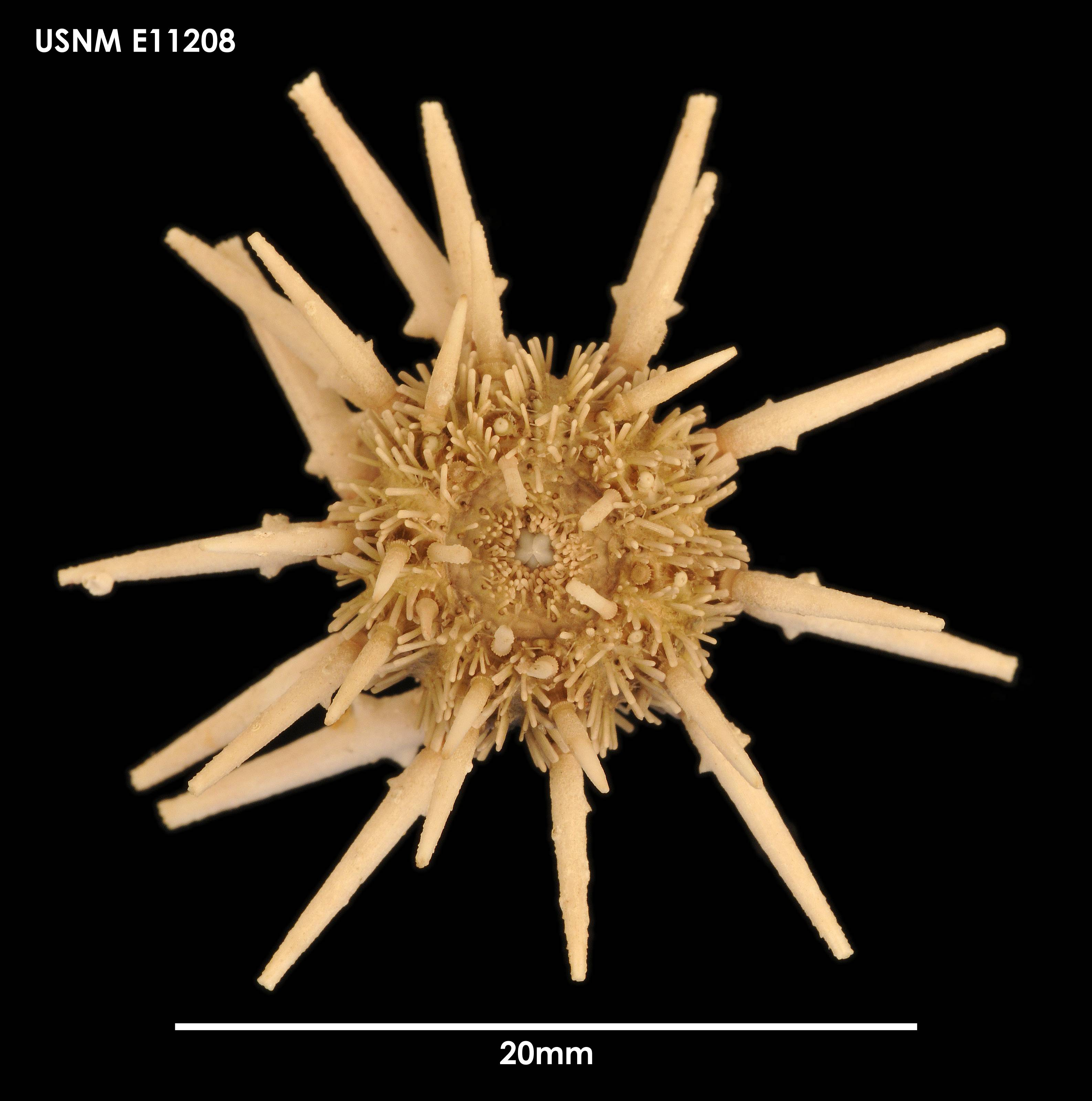
Goniocidaris umbraculum
