= Aporocidaris fragilis =

Scientific classification
- Domain: Eukaryota
- Kingdom: Animalia
- Phylum: Echinodermata
- Class: Echinoidea
- Order: Cidaroida
- Family: Ctenocidaridae
- Genus: Aporocidaris
- Species: A. fragilis

Binomial name
- Aporocidaris fragilis A. Assagiz & Clark, 1907

Species of sea urchin

Aporocidaris fragilis is a species of sea urchin of the family Ctenocidaridae. It is well-armoured with spines. It is placed in the genus Aporocidaris and lives in the sea. Aporocidaris fragilis was first scientifically described in 1907 by Alexander Emanuel Agassiz & Hubert Lyman Clark.

This species is morphologically very similar to Aporocidaris milleri and Aporocidaris antarctica and they may not be separate species. Aporocidaris fragilis is found in the North Pacific Ocean between the Kamchatka Peninsula and Alaska at depths of more than 3,500 m (11,500 ft).
