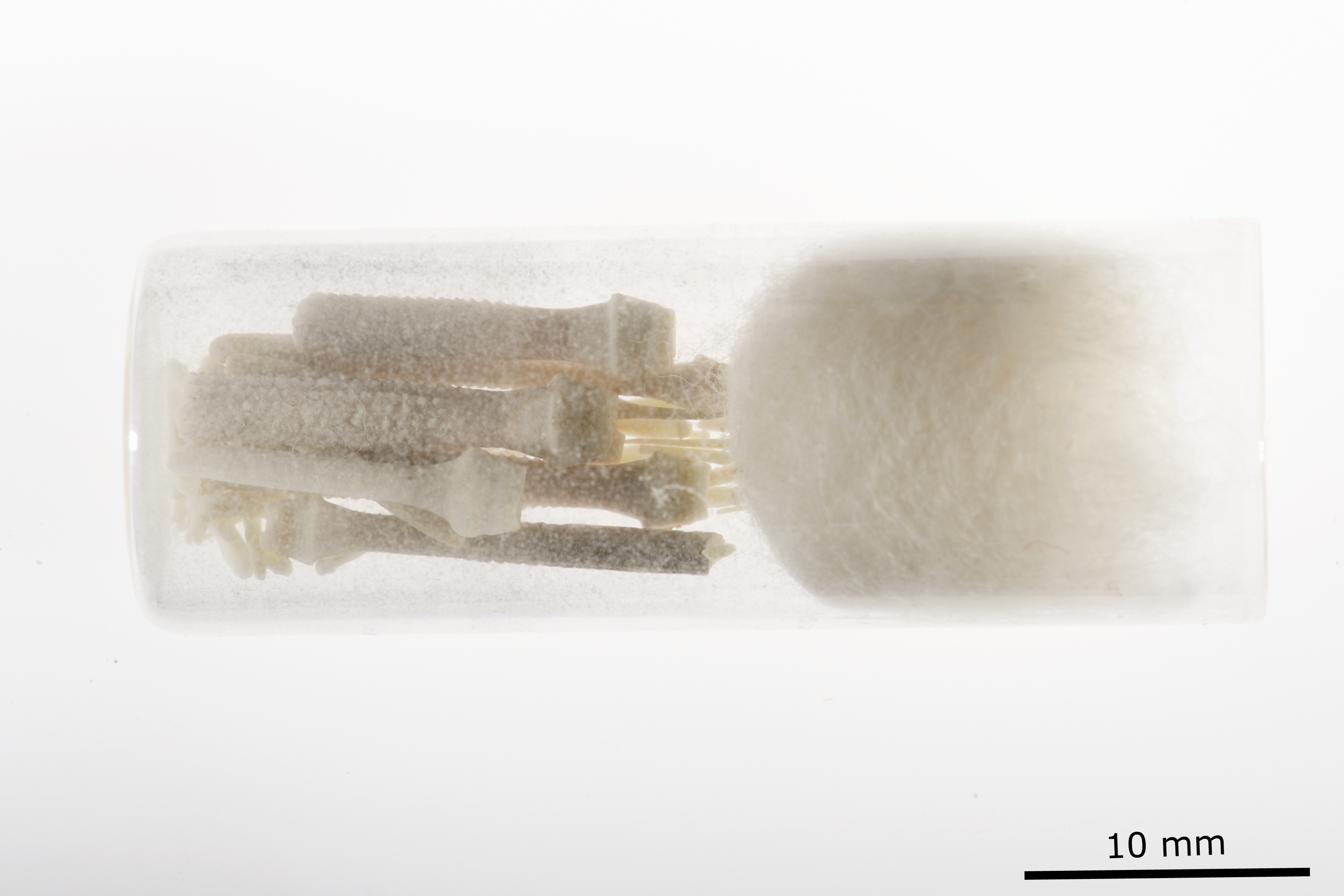
- Cidaris mabahissae

Scientific classification
- Kingdom: Animalia
- Phylum: Echinodermata
- Class: Echinoidea
- Order: Cidaroida
- Family: Cidaridae
- Genus: Cidaris
- Species: C. mabahissae

Binomial name
- Cidaris mabahissae (Mortensen, 1939)

= Cidaris mabahissae =

Species of sea urchin

Cidaris mabahissae is a species of sea urchins of the Family Cidaridae. Their armour is covered with spines. Cidaris mabahissae was first scientifically described in 1939 by Ole Mortensen.

== See also ==
- Cidaris abyssicola
- Cidaris blakei
- Cidaris nuda
