= Cidaris nuda =

Scientific classification
- Kingdom: Animalia
- Phylum: Echinodermata
- Class: Echinoidea
- Order: Cidaroida
- Family: Cidaridae
- Genus: Cidaris
- Species: C. nuda

Binomial name
- Cidaris nuda (Mortensen, 1903)

Synonyms
- Dorocidaris nuda Mortensen, 1903

Species of sea urchin

Cidaris nuda is a species of sea urchins of the Family Cidaridae. Their armour is covered with spines. Cidaris nuda was first scientifically described in 1903 by Ole Mortensen.

== See also ==
- Cidaris blakei
- Cidaris mabahissae
- Cidaris rugosa
