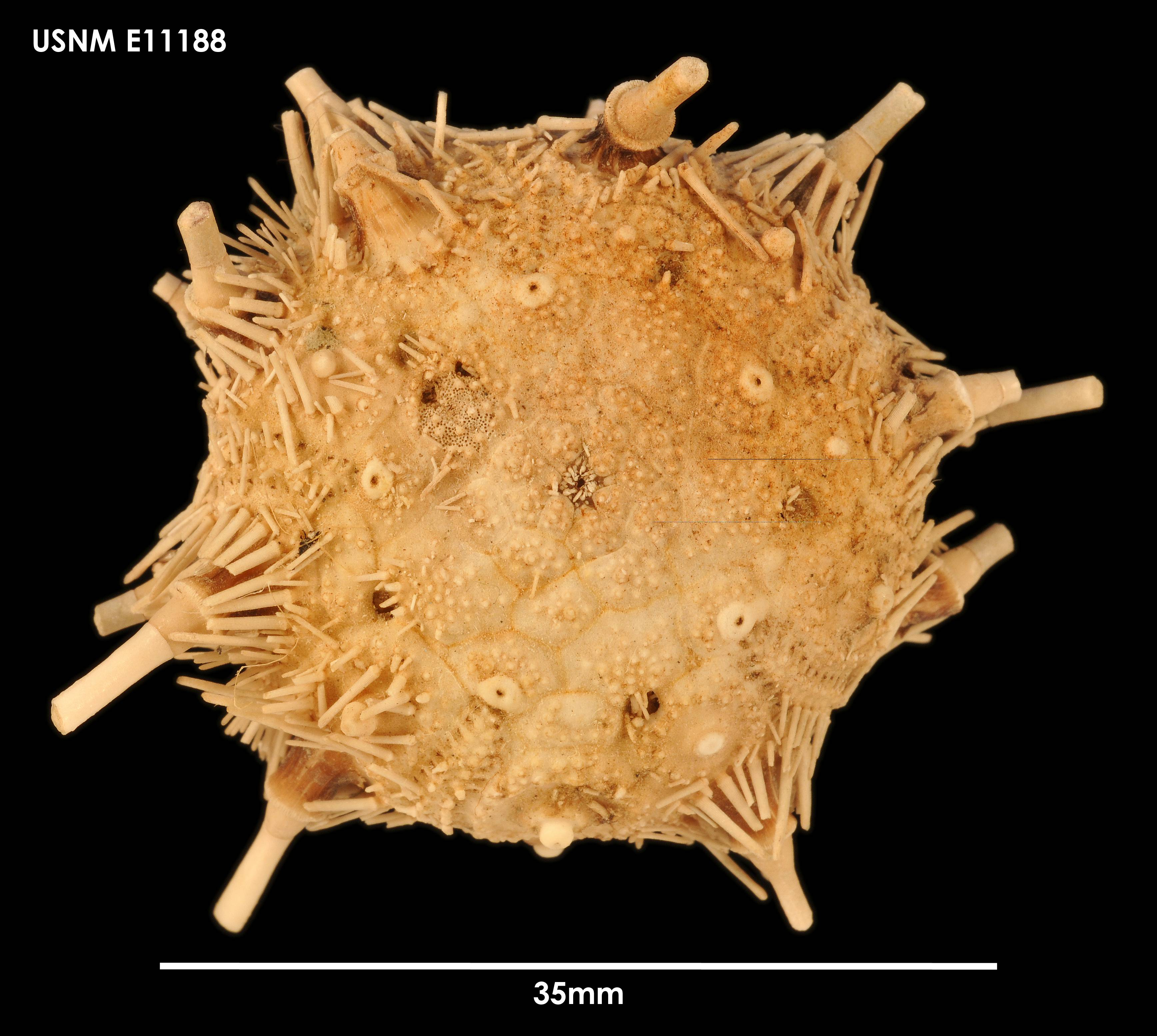

Scientific classification
- Kingdom: Animalia
- Phylum: Echinodermata
- Class: Echinoidea
- Order: Cidaroida
- Family: Ctenocidaridae
- Genus: Aporocidaris
- Species: A. eltaniana

Binomial name
- Aporocidaris eltaniana Mooi, David, Fell & Choné, 2000

= Aporocidaris eltaniana =

Species of sea urchin

Aporocidaris eltaniana is a species of sea urchin of the family Ctenocidaridae. Their armour is covered with spines. It is placed in the genus Aporocidaris and lives in the sea. Aporocidaris eltaniana was first scientifically described in 2000 by Mooi, David, Fell & Choné. It is found in the waters off Livingston Island in the South Shetland Islands at depths between 884 and 1,437 m (2,900 and 4,700 ft).

== Description ==
Aporocidaris eltaniana grows to a maximum diameter of 45 mm (2 in) with a height of about half this.
