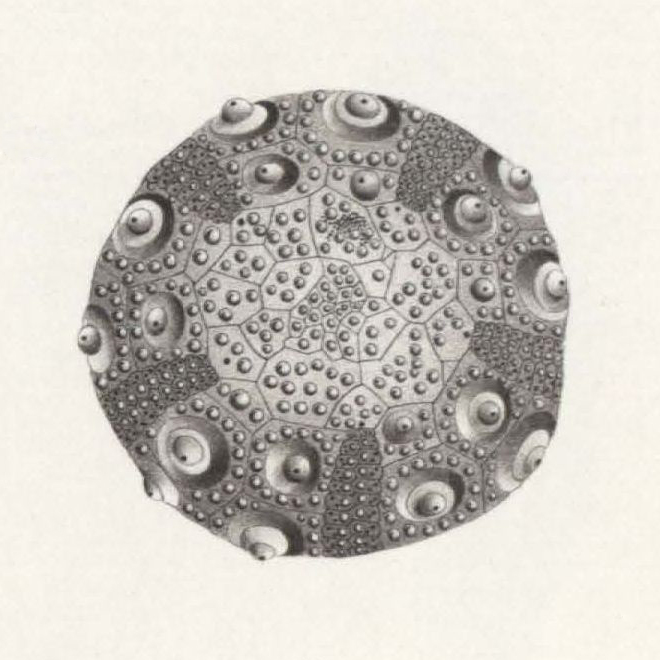

Scientific classification
- Kingdom: Animalia
- Phylum: Echinodermata
- Class: Echinoidea
- Order: Cidaroida
- Family: Ctenocidaridae
- Genus: Aporocidaris
- Species: A. incerta

Binomial name
- Aporocidaris incerta (Koehler, 1902)

= Aporocidaris incerta =

Species of sea urchin

Aporocidaris incerta is a species of sea urchin of the family Ctenocidaridae. It is placed in the genus Aporocidaris and lives in the deep sea. Aporocidaris incerta was first scientifically described in 1902 by Koehler. This species lives around the Antarctic continent at depths down to about 300 m (1,000 ft).

== Description ==
Aporocidaris incerta has a compressed test, the height of which is less than half its diameter, which is a maximum of 30 mm (1.2 in). The primary spines are as long as the test is wide. When preserved, this species is dark brown.

Ecologically, A. incerta inhabits depths of approximately 300 meters, typically along continental slopes or abyssal plains surrounding Antarctica. The extreme environment in which it lives is marked by low temperatures, high pressure, and minimal light. Like other cidaroid sea urchins, A. incerta is presumed to be a slow moving detritivore, feeding on organic matter and microorganisms that settle from the upper water column. This feeding behavior plays an important role in nutrient recycling, contributing to benthic ecosystem stability. Additionally, the species’ slow metabolic rate reflects adaptations to energy poor conditions, enabling survival where few other echinoderms can thrive.
