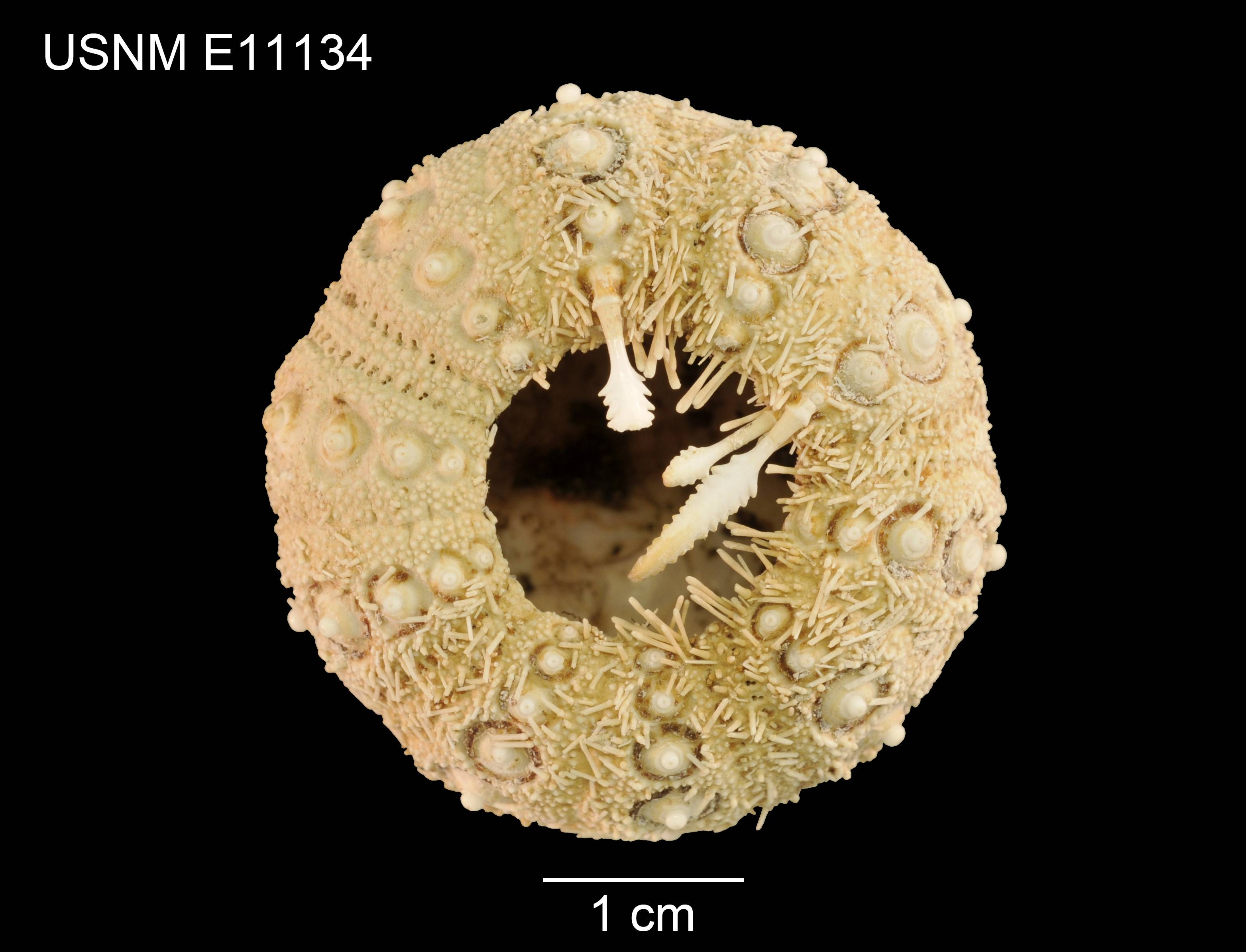

Scientific classification
- Kingdom: Animalia
- Phylum: Echinodermata
- Class: Echinoidea
- Order: Cidaroida
- Family: Ctenocidaridae
- Genus: Aporocidaris
- Species: A. usarpi

Binomial name
- Aporocidaris usarpi Mooi, David, Fell & Choné, 2000

= Aporocidaris usarpi =

Species of sea urchin

Aporocidaris usarpi is a species of sea urchin of the family Ctenocidaridae. Their armour is covered with spines. It is placed in the genus Aporocidaris and lives in the sea. Aporocidaris usarpi was first scientifically described in 2000 by Mooi, David, Fell & Choné.
