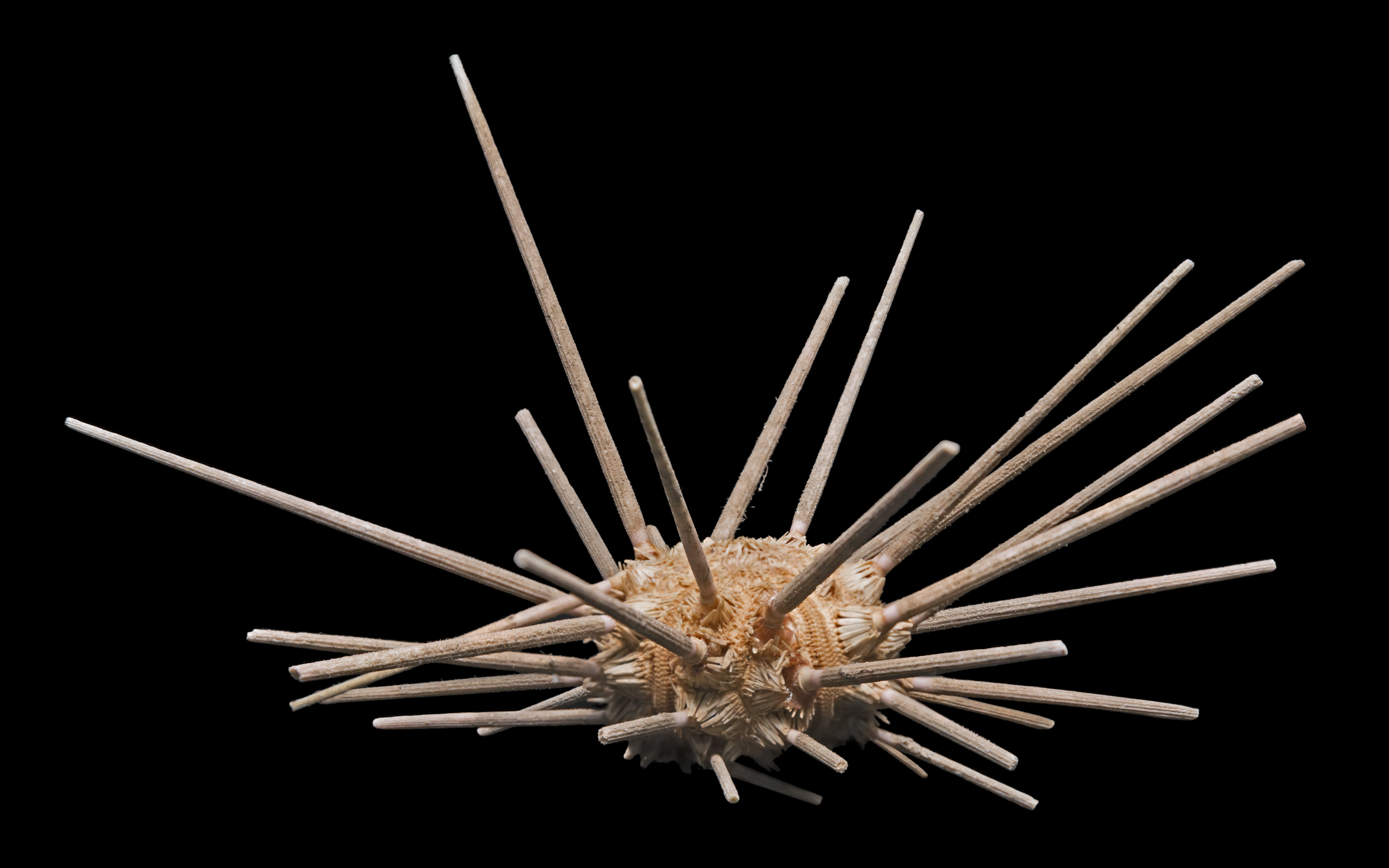
- Cidaris cidaris Dried specimen

Scientific classification
- Kingdom: Animalia
- Phylum: Echinodermata
- Class: Echinoidea
- Order: Cidaroida
- Family: Cidaridae
- Genus: Cidaris
- Species: C. cidaris

Binomial name
- Cidaris cidaris (Linnaeus, 1758)

Synonyms
- Cidaris borealis Düben, 1844; Cidaris hystrix (Lamarck, 1816); Cidaris papillata Leske, 1778; Cidarites hystrix Lamarck, 1816; Dorocidaris papillata (Leske, 1778); Echinus cidaris Linnaeus, 1758; Leiocidaris hystrix (Lamarck, 1816); Leiocidaris papillata (Leske, 1778); Orthocidaris hystrix (Lamarck, 1816); Orthocidaris papillata (Leske, 1778)

= Cidaris cidaris =

Species of sea urchin

Cidaris cidaris is a species of sea urchin commonly known as the long-spine slate pen sea urchin. It is found in deep water in the eastern Atlantic Ocean and the Mediterranean Sea.

== Description ==
Cidaris cidaris has a small central test from which project a number of long, blunt, widely separated primary spines and a dense covering of short secondary spines. The primaries are pale grey, tipped with green and the secondaries are pale green. The test has a diameter of 7 cm (2.8 in) to 8 cm (3.1 in) and the spines are twice as long as this. The sea urchin often has bits of algae, sponge or other organisms adhering to the spines.

== Distribution ==
Cidaris cidaris is found in the eastern Atlantic Ocean and the Mediterranean Sea in deep water on coral, rock and gravel bottoms. Its range extends from Cape Verde, the Azores and the Canary Islands northwards to the Faroe Islands and Norway. It is also found on knolls and seamounts at depths down to about 1,800 metres (5,900 ft).

== Biology ==
Cidaris cidaris feeds on sponges, sea fans and algae.

Cidaris cidaris is one of a number of species of sea urchin that can suffer from bald sea urchin disease.

== See also ==
- Cidaris abyssicola
