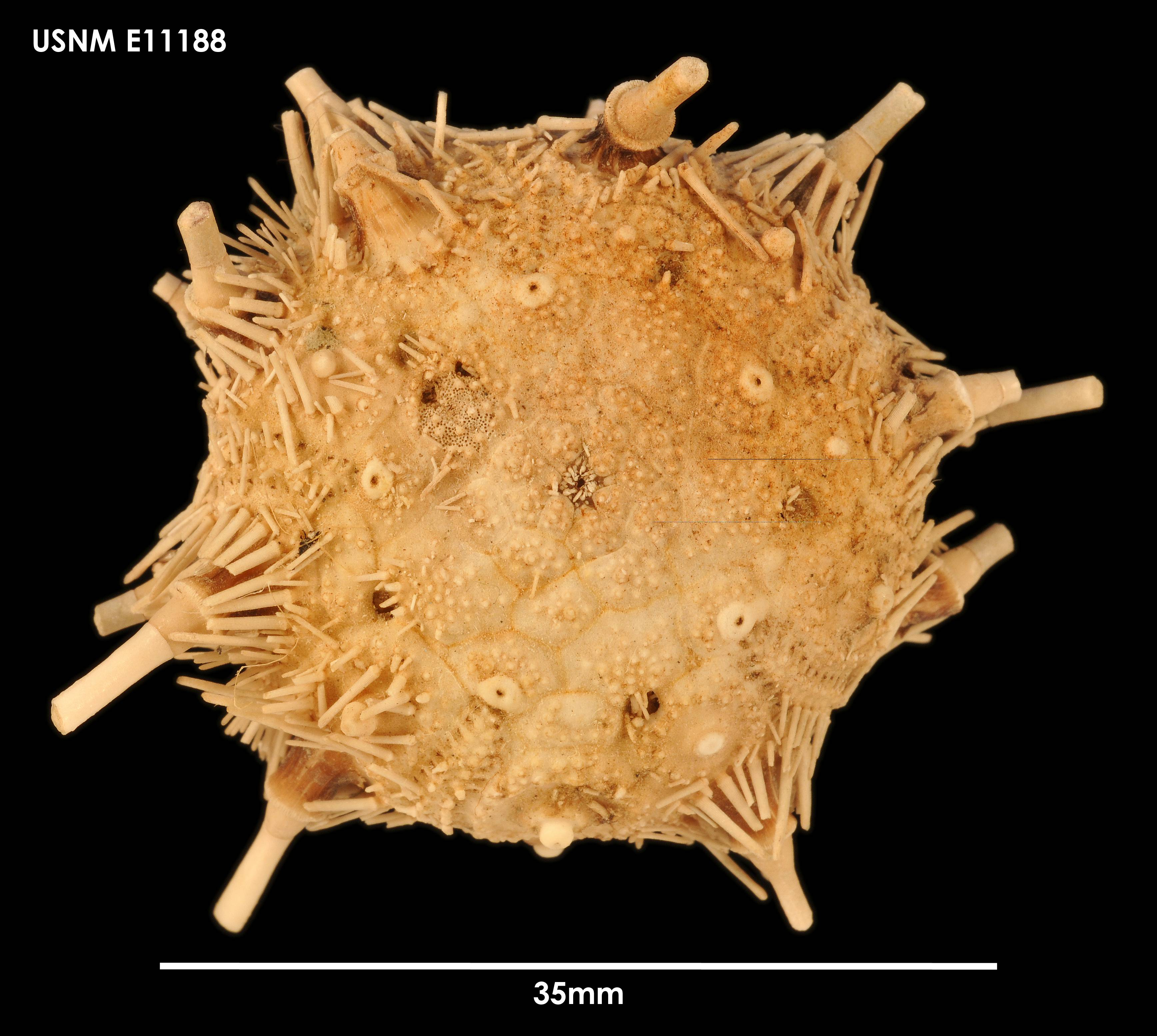
- Aporocidaris eltaniana

Scientific classification
- Kingdom: Animalia
- Phylum: Echinodermata
- Class: Echinoidea
- Order: Cidaroida
- Family: Ctenocidaridae
- Genus: Aporocidaris; Agassiz & Clark, 1907

Species
- See text

= Aporocidaris =

Genus of sea urchins

Aporocidaris is a genus of sea urchins in the family Ctenocidaridae. Several species are found in deep water in circum-Antarctic locations.

== Characteristics ==
The test is rather compressed, with a flat base and thin fragile plates, and the apical system is conspicuously domed. The primary spines are long and very slender and the secondary spines are cylindrical and erect.

== Species ==
The following species are recognised by the World Register of Marine Species:

- Aporocidaris antarctica Mortensen, 1909
- Aporocidaris eltaniana Mooi, David, Fell & Choné, 2000
- Aporocidaris fragilis Agassiz & Clark, 1907
- Aporocidaris incerta (Koehler, 1902)
- Aporocidaris milleri (Agassiz, 1898)
- Aporocidaris usarpi Mooi, David, Fell & Choné, 2000
