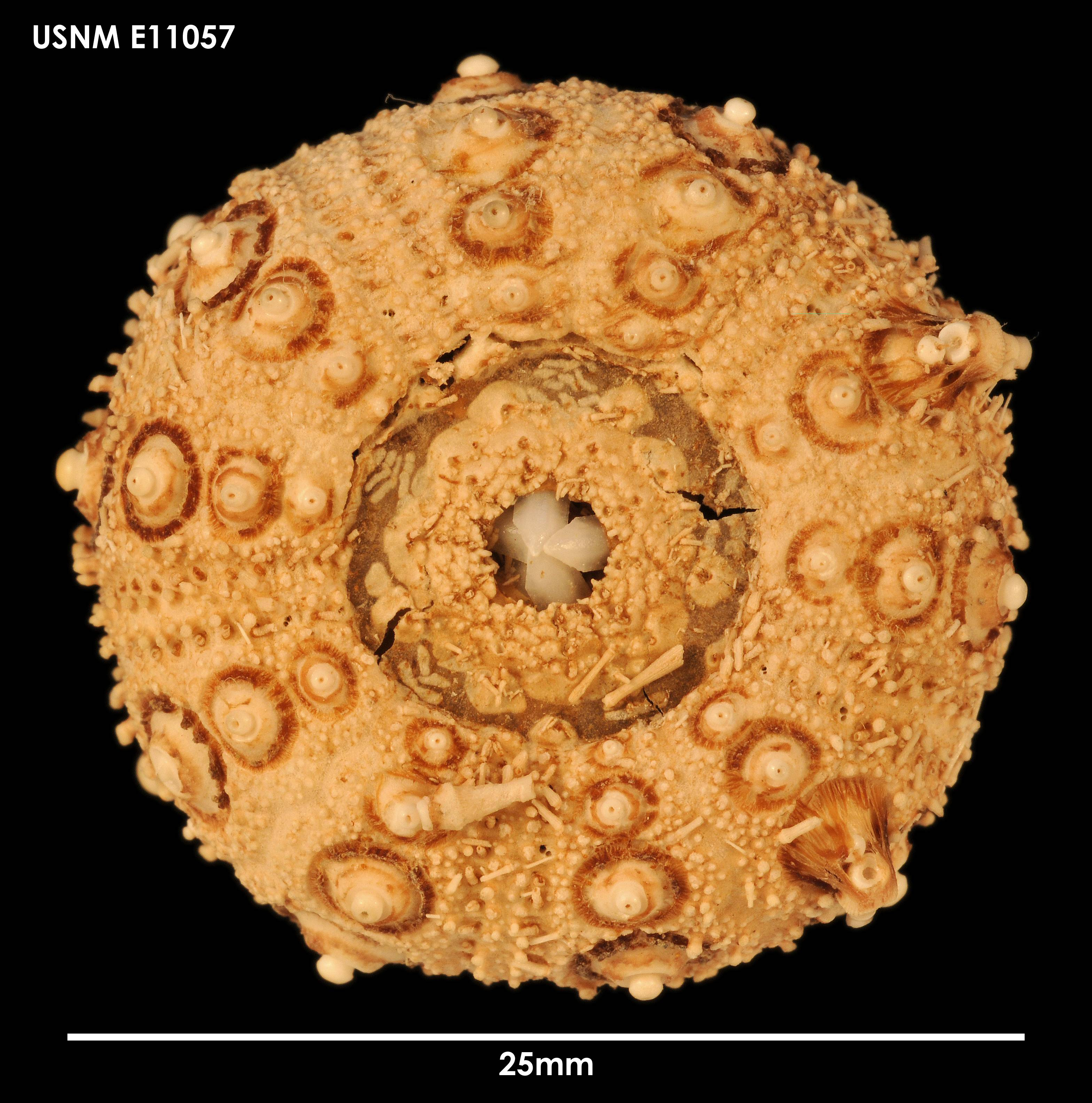

Scientific classification
- Kingdom: Animalia
- Phylum: Echinodermata
- Class: Echinoidea
- Order: Cidaroida
- Family: Ctenocidaridae
- Genus: Aporocidaris
- Species: A. milleri

Binomial name
- Aporocidaris milleri (A. Agassiz, 1898)

= Aporocidaris milleri =

Species of sea urchin

Aporocidaris milleri is a species of sea urchin of the family Ctenocidaridae. Their armour is covered with spines. It is placed in the genus Aporocidaris and lives in the sea. Aporocidaris milleri was first scientifically described in 1898 by Alexander Emanuel Agassiz.
