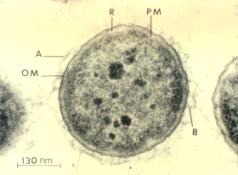

Scientific classification
- Domain: Bacteria
- Kingdom: Pseudomonadati
- Phylum: Pseudomonadota
- Class: Gammaproteobacteria
- Order: Aeromonadales
- Family: Aeromonadaceae
- Genus: Aeromonas
- Species: A. salmonicida

Binomial name
- Aeromonas salmonicida (Lehmann and Neumann 1896) Griffin et al. 1953

Synonyms
- Bacillus salmonicida (Lehmann and Neumann 1896) Kruse 1896 Bacterium salmonicida Lehmann and Neumann 1896 Proteus salmonicida (Lehmann and Neumann 1896) Pribram 1933

= Aeromonas salmonicida =

Species of bacterium

Aeromonas salmonicida is a pathogenic bacterium that severely impacts salmonid populations and other species. It was first discovered in a Bavarian brown trout hatchery by Emmerich and Weibel in 1894. The ability of Aeromonas salmonicida to infect a variety of hosts, multiply, and adapt, makes it a prime virulent bacterium. A. salmonicida is an etiological agent for furunculosis, a disease that causes sepsis, haemorrhages, muscle lesions, inflammation of the lower intestine, spleen enlargement, and death in freshwater fish populations. It is found worldwide except South America. The major route of contamination is poor water quality; however, it can also be associated stress factors such as overcrowding, high temperatures, and trauma. Spawning and smolting fish are prime victims of furunculosis due to their immunocompromised state of being.

== Morphology and bacterial characteristics ==
Aeromonas salmonicida is a Gram-negative, facultatively anaerobic, nonmotile bacterium. It is rod-shaped, about 1.3–2.0 by 0.8–1.3 μm in size, and grows optimally at temperatures between 22 and 25 °C. The bacterium readily ferments and oxidizes glucose, and is catalase- and cytochrome oxidase-positive. Its molecular properties include a special surface protein array called the A-layer, which is believed to be responsible for the bacterium's virulent traits, and lipopolysaccharide, the cells' major cell envelope antigen. The A-layer consists of a 50-kD protein, and provides protection to the bacterium. The lipopolysaccharide consists of three moieties: lipid A, a core oligosaccharide, and an O-polysaccharide (O-antigen). The extracellular products of A. salmonicida consist of 25 proteins, enzymes, and toxins, and many more. In addition, the genome is composed of a single circular chromosome (4,702,402 bp), with two large and three small plasmids. The chromosome yields 58.5% of G+C pairs, has 4086 encoding proteins, and totals 4388 genes.

A. salmonicida isolates flourish when grown on blood agar or tyrosine. Large colonies are observed along with a brown diffusible pigment within two to four days. Most typical strains are morphologically and biochemically homogenous with a few exceptions. Some of these exceptions include a distinguishable variation in pigment production, the bacterium's ability to ferment selected sugars, and Voges-Proskauer assay results.

== Cell structure and metabolism ==
A. salmonicida is a facultative anaerobe, which means it is capable of making ATP by aerobic respiration if oxygen is present, but is also capable of switching to fermentation when oxygen is not present. It does not ferment sucrose or lactose, using glucose in this pathway, instead; glucose fermentation creates gas. The bacterium grows optimally at temperatures between 22 and 25 °C. The maximum temperature at which it can grow is 34.5 °C. After about a 24-hour growth period, the bacterial colonies reach about the size of a pin point. The colonies also have a brown pigmented color that appears after it has been growing for 48–72 hours.

== Host range ==
- Salmon
- Trout
- Cyprinids
- Pike
- Perch
- Bullheads
- Turbot
- Halibut

== Epizootiology ==
A. salmonicida, an airborne pathogen, can travel 104 cm from its host into the atmosphere and back to the water, thus making it difficult to control. The bacterium can maintain its pathogenicity in freshwater conditions for 6–9 months, and in saltwater conditions for up to 10 days without a host. Several direct count methods and other detection methods have found the organism does not lose or reduces its titer concentrations.

Transmission of furunculosis mainly occurs through fish-to-fish contact by the skin or by ingestion. Rainbow trout have been found to carry A. salmonicida up to two years after initial infection without re-exposure. Chemically immunosuppressed fish compared with temperature-stressed fish had a 73% mortality as opposed to a 33% mortality rate, respectively. Naturally occurring trout infections consisted of a 5–6% mortality rate per week with an 85% rate in untreated populations. Some clinical furunculosis survivors of an infected trout population became A. salmonicida carriers. When comparing furunculosis epidemics with depressed oxygen levels, when oxygen concentrations were decreased to less than 5 mg/L, A. salmonicida concentrations increased. While observing chum salmon in a density of 14.7 fish per square meter, 12.4% were infected with A. salmonicida, whereas, densities at 4.9 fish per square meter were infection-free. Additionally, A. salmonicida concentrations were considerably elevated in water with low dissolved oxygen (6–7 mg/L), compared to water with higher dissolved oxygen (10 mg/L). High density-low oxygen water resulted in survival rates that were roughly 40% less than in those consisting of low density-high oxygen conditions.

== Pathology ==
The bacterium is pathogenic for fish, and causes the disease known as furunculosis. The symptoms the fish show are external and internal hemorrhaging, swelling of the vents and kidneys, boils, ulcers, liquefaction, and gastroenteritis. Furunculosis is commonly known as tail rot in fish and is common in goldfish and koi. Infected fish with open sores are able to spread the disease to other fish.

It is also one of several bacteria that can cause bald sea urchin disease. Since A. salmonicida cannot grow at 37 °C, it is not pathogenic in humans.

== Clinical symptoms and disease diagnosis ==
Furunculosis is classified into four categories based on severity: acute, subacute, chronic, or latent. When fish are infected, they become listless and weak until they die. Other characteristics observed include anorexia and lethargic movement, and they may exhibit a darkened pigment. Deep or shallow ulcers, exophthalmia, bloody spots, distended abdomen, and petechia at the base of the fin may also occur. Internally, the infected fish may suffer from gastroenteritis, hemorrhagic septicemia, edematous kidney, and an enlarged spleen. The liver may appear pale in color and the spleen may be darkened. The peritoneal cavity may also be bloody and inflamed.

Bacteria must be isolated to positively identify the disease. Isolates are retrieved from muscle lesions, kidney, spleen, or liver, and then grown on trypticase soy agar and brain-heart infusion medium incubated at 20–25 °C. Colonies of A. salmonicida appear hard, friable, smooth, soft, and dark in color.

While cultural procedures produce good results, serological procedures produce more rapid results by using serum agglutination, fluorescent antibody, or enzyme linked immunosorbent assay on infected tissue or cultured bacteria. Mooney et al. developed a DNA probe with polymerase chain reaction to detect A. salmonicida DNA; results were successful in 88% of wild Atlantic salmon.

== Detection ==
A. salmonicida tests negative for indole formation, coagulase, hydrolysis of starch, casein, triglycerides, and phospholipids, hydrogen sulfide production, citrate use, phenylalanine, and the Voges–Proskauer (butanediol fermentation) test. It tests positive for oxidase, lysine decarboxylase, methyl red, gelatin hydrolysis, and catalase.
