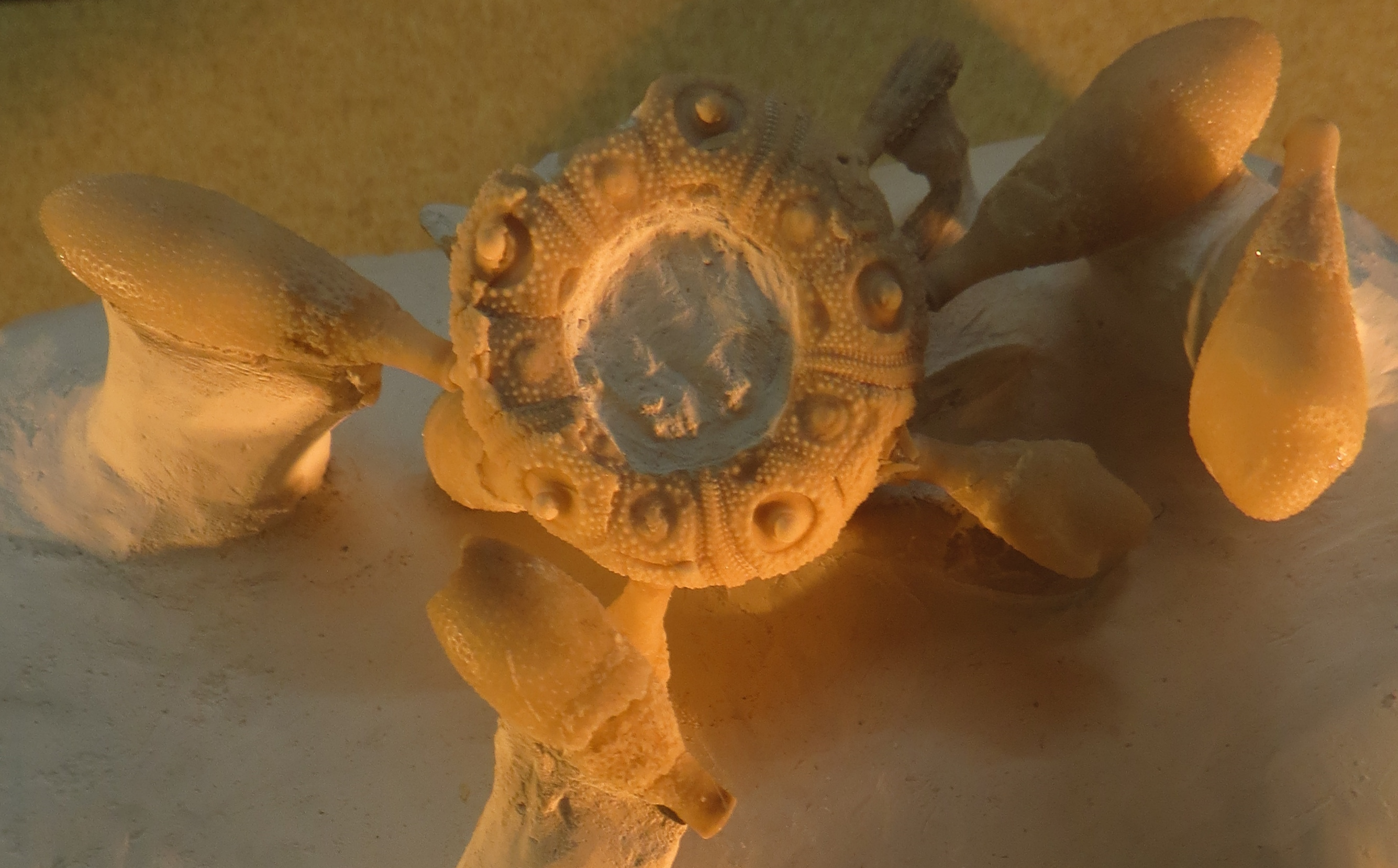
- Tylocidaris baltica, a Maastrichtian fossil from Denmark

Scientific classification
- Kingdom: Animalia
- Phylum: Echinodermata
- Class: Echinoidea
- Order: Cidaroida
- Family: Psychocidaridae
- Genus: †Tylocidaris; Pomel, 1883

= Tylocidaris =

Tylocidaris Temporal range: Early Cretaceous-Eocene

Extinct genus of sea urchins

Tylocidaris is an extinct genus of sea urchins that lived from the Early Cretaceous to the Eocene. Its remains have been found in Europe and North America.
