= Aporocidaris antarctica =

Scientific classification
- Domain: Eukaryota
- Kingdom: Animalia
- Phylum: Echinodermata
- Class: Echinoidea
- Order: Cidaroida
- Family: Ctenocidaridae
- Genus: Aporocidaris
- Species: A. antarctica

Binomial name
- Aporocidaris antarctica Mortensen, 1909

Species of sea urchin

Aporocidaris antarctica is a species of sea urchin of the family Ctenocidaridae. Their armour is covered with spines. It is placed in the genus Aporocidaris and lives in the sea. Aporocidaris antarctica was first scientifically described in 1909 by Ole Theodor Jensen Mortensen, Danish professor. It has a circum-Antarctic distribution.

== Description ==
Aporocidaris antarctica grows to a maximum diameter of 45 mm (2 in). The test and secondary spines are purple and the rather brittle primary spines are white.
