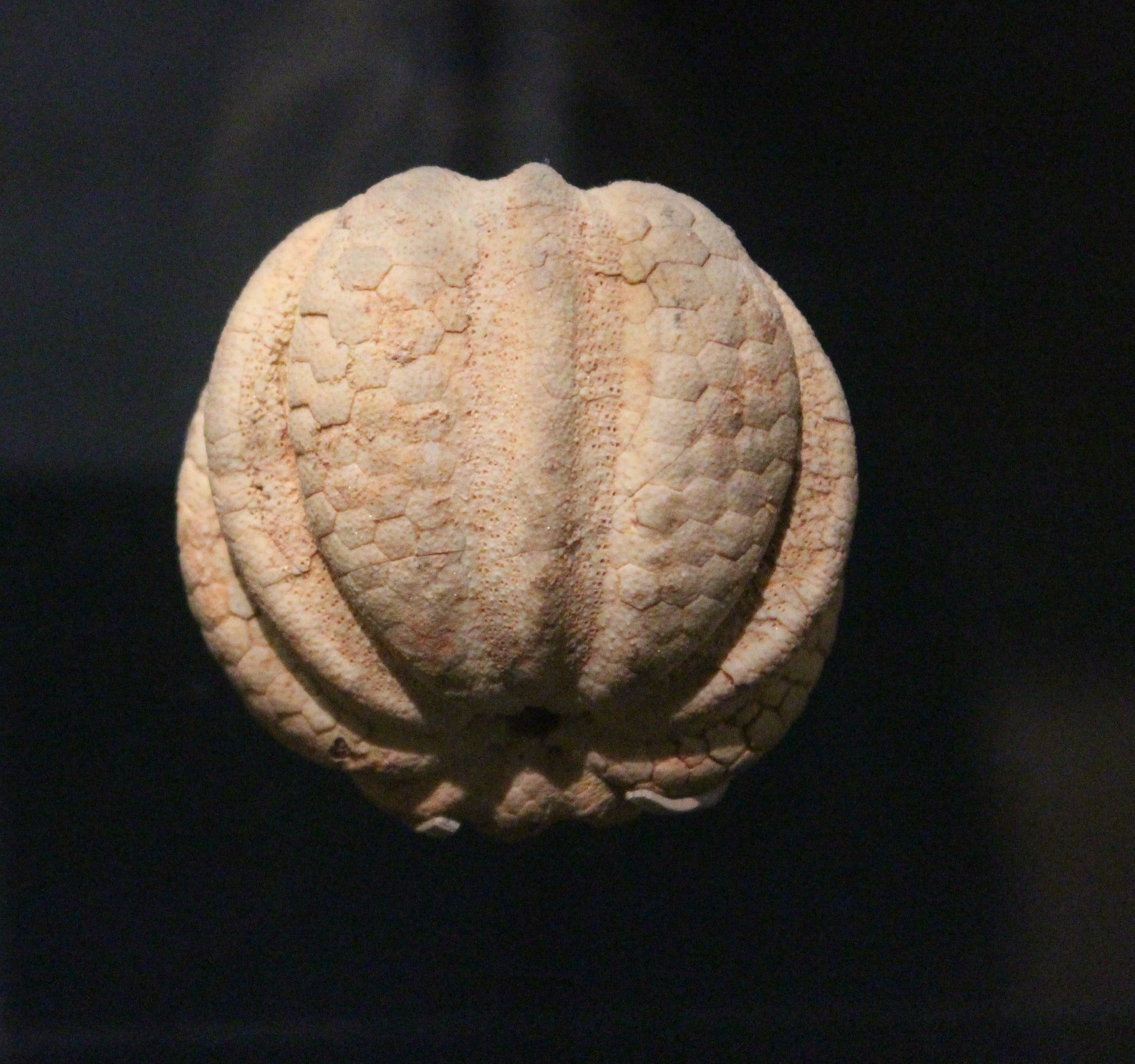
- M. indianensis, National Museum of Natural History

Scientific classification
- Kingdom: Animalia
- Phylum: Echinodermata
- Class: Echinoidea
- Order: †Echinocystitoida
- Genus: †Melonechinus

= Melonechinus =

Melonechinus Temporal range: Carboniferous

Extinct genus of sea urchins

Melonechinus is an extinct genus of echinoid that lived in the Carboniferous. Its remains have been found in North America.

== Sources ==
- Fossils (Smithsonian Handbooks) by David Ward (Page 175)
