= Bald sea urchin disease =

Species of sea urchin

Bald sea urchin disease is a bacterial disease known to affect several species of sea urchins in the Mediterranean Sea, North Atlantic and along the California coastline. Research suggests two pathogens are responsible for the disease, Listonella anguillarum and Aeromonas salmonicida.

Infection generally occurs at the site of an existing physical injury. The affected area turns green and spines and other appendages are lost. Namely, spine loss is the key characteristic of the disease. If the lesion remains shallow and covers less than 30% of the animal's surface area, the animal tends to survive and eventually regenerates any lost tissue. However, if the damage is more extensive or so deep that the hard inner test is perforated, the disease is fatal.

== Affected species ==
- Allocentrotus fragilis
- Arbacia lixula
- Cidaris cidaris
- Echinus esculentus
- Paracentrotus lividus
- Psammechinus miliaris
- Sphaerechinus granularis
- Strongylocentrotus droebachiensis
- Strongylocentrotus franciscanus
- Strongylocentrotus purpuratus
