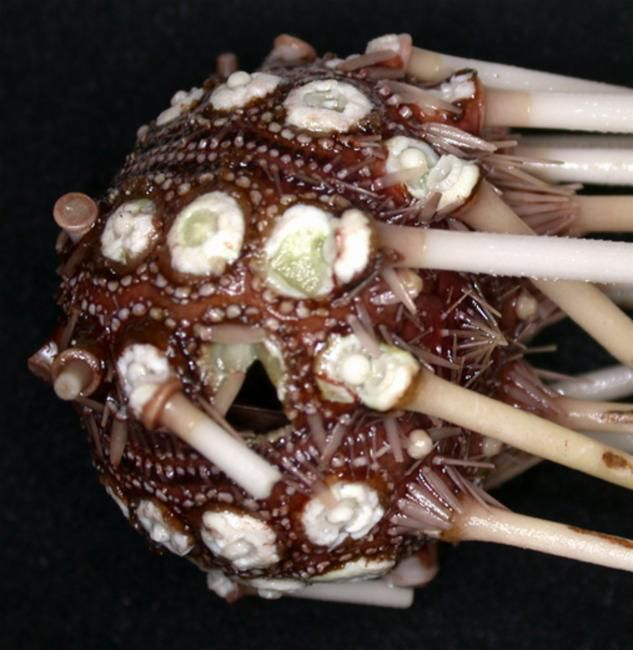

Scientific classification
- Kingdom: Animalia
- Phylum: Echinodermata
- Class: Echinoidea
- Order: Cidaroida
- Family: Histocidaridae
- Genus: Histocidaris
- Species: H. elegans

Binomial name
- Histocidaris elegans (Agassiz, 1879)

Synonyms
- Cidaris elegans (Agassiz, 1879); Cidaris (Histocidaris) elegans (Agassiz, 1879); Plegiocidaris challengeri Lambert & Thiéry, 1910; Porocidaris elegans Agassiz, 1879

= Histocidaris elegans =

Extinct species of sea urchin

Histocidaris elegans is a species of sea urchin in the family Histocidaridae.
