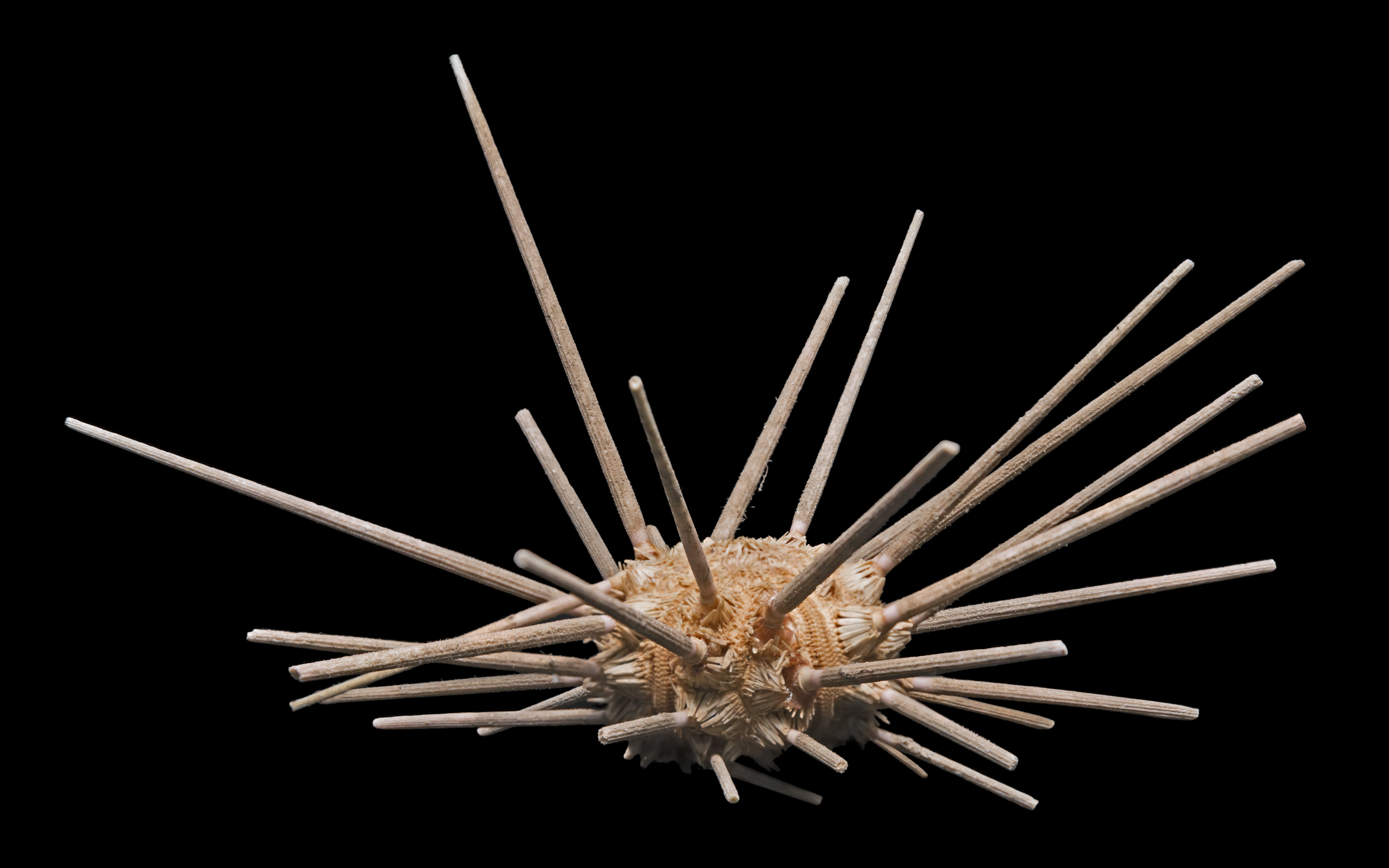
- Cidaris cidaris

Scientific classification
- Kingdom: Animalia
- Phylum: Echinodermata
- Class: Echinoidea
- Order: Cidaroida
- Family: Cidaridae
- Subfamily: Cidarinae
- Genus: Cidaris; Leske, 1778

Type species
- Echinus cidaris, Linnaeus, 1758

Synonyms
- Dorocidaris Agassiz, 1869

= Cidaris =

Cidaris Temporal range: Triassic–Recent

Genus of sea urchins

Cidaris is a genus of pencil sea urchins.

== Species ==
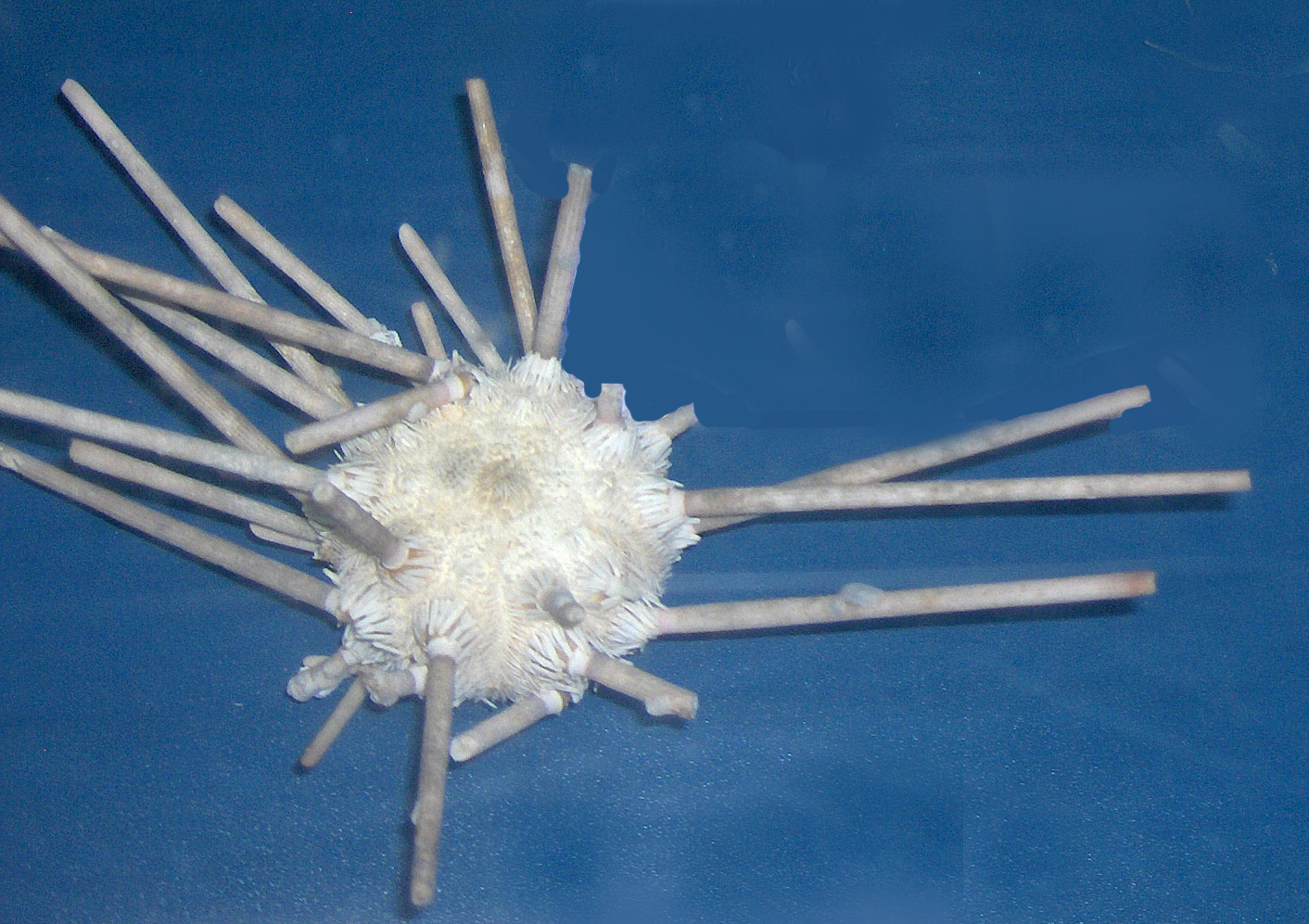
Cidaris cidaris

According to the World Register of Marine Species (WoRMS), the genus Cidaris contains the following extant species

- Cidaris abyssicola (Agassiz, 1869)
- Cidaris annulata (Gray, 1855)
- Cidaris baculosa (Lamarck, 1816)
- Cidaris blakei (Agassiz 1878)
- Cidaris cidaris (Linnaeus, 1758)
- Cidaris mabahissae (Mortensen, 1939)
- Cidaris nuda (Mortensen, 1903)
- Cidaris rugosa (Clark, 1907)
- Cidaris thouarsii (Agassiz & Desor, 1846)

== Extinct species or names brought to synonymy ==
- †Cidaris aculeata
- †Cidaris aialensis
- †Cidaris alpina
- †Cidaris alternata
- †Cidaris austriaca
- †Cidaris avena
- †Cidaris biconica
- †Cidaris biformis
- †Cidaris braunii
- †Cidaris buchii
- †Cidaris caudex
- †Cidaris cingulata
- †Cidaris coralliophila
- †Cidaris costalarensis
- †Cidaris costata
- †Cidaris costeanensis
- †Cidaris decorata
- †Cidaris decoratissima
- †Cidaris dorsata
- †Cidaris ecki
- †Cidaris elegans Munster, 1826
- †Cidaris elegans Agassiz, 1879, synonym for Histocidaris elegans
- †Cidaris forminensis
- †Cidaris fustis
- †Cidaris glabra
- †Cidaris hausmanni
- †Cidaris lanceata
- †Cidaris linearis
- †Cidaris milierensis
- †Cidaris ovata
- †Cidaris perplexa
- †Cidaris petersii
- †Cidaris plana
- †Cidaris pyramidalis
- †Cidaris quadrialata
- †Cidaris quadriserrata
- †Cidaris regnyi
- †Cidaris remifera
- †Cidaris remifera
- †Cidaris reticulata
- †Cidaris schwageri
- †Cidaris scrobiculata
- †Cidaris seelandica
- †Cidaris semicostata
- †Cidaris similis
- †Cidaris spinachristi
- †Cidaris spongiosa
- †Cidaris stipes
- †Cidaris stoppanii
- †Cidaris sulcata
- †Cidaris tenuicostata
- †Cidaris tetraedrica
- †Cidaris transversa
- †Cidaris trapezoidalis
- †Cidaris trigona
- †Cidaris triserrata
- †Cidaris undulatus
- †Cidaris valparolae
- †Cidaris verticillata
- †Cidaris verticillata
- †Cidaris waechteri
- †Cidaris wissmanni
- †Cidaris zardini
