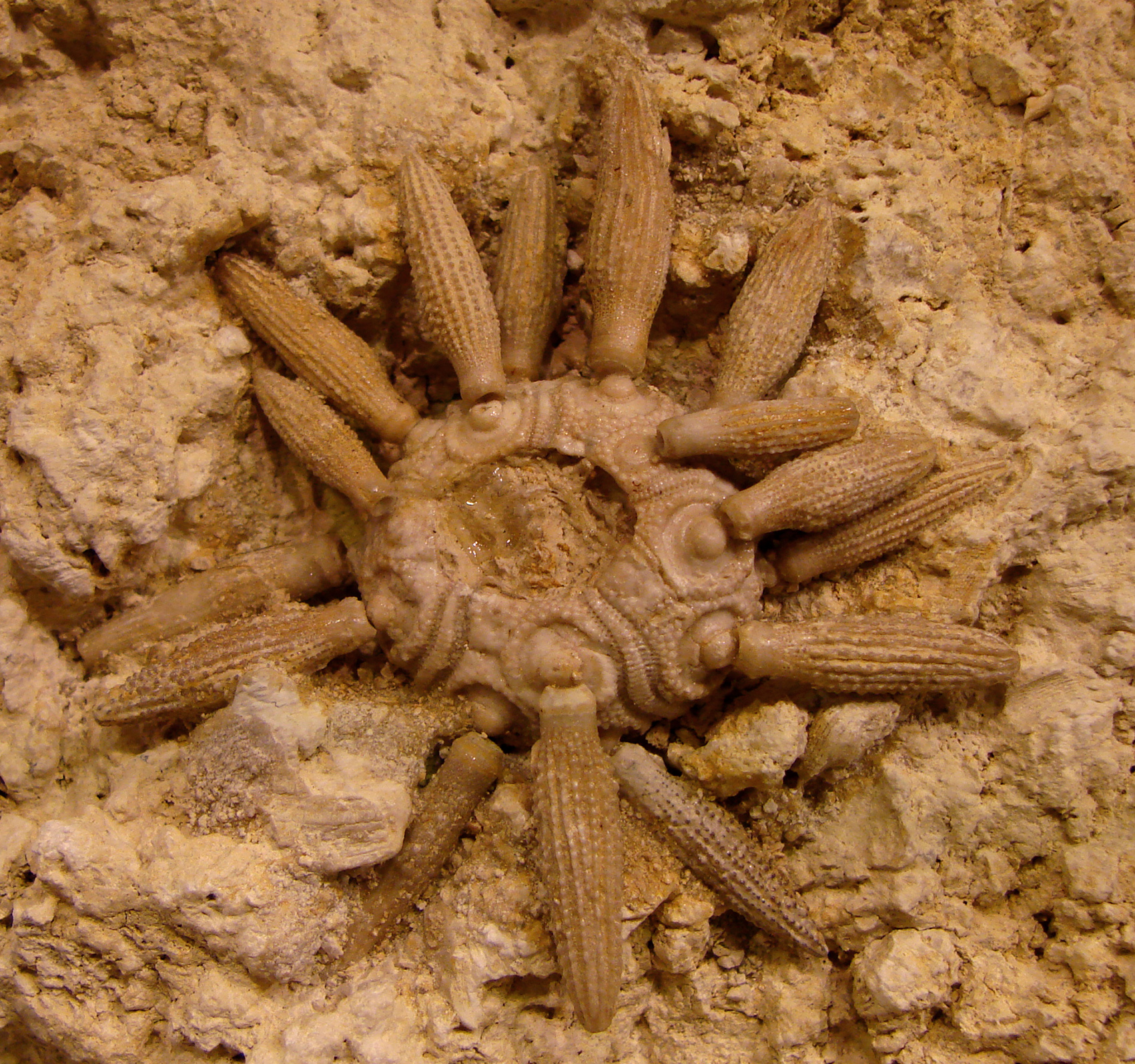
- Fossil of Balanocidaris marginata

Scientific classification
- Kingdom: Animalia
- Phylum: Echinodermata
- Class: Echinoidea
- Order: Cidaroida
- Superfamily: Histocidaroidea
- Family: Psychocidaridae; Ikeda, 1936

Genera
- See text

= Psychocidaridae =

Psychocidaridae Temporal range: Lower Jurassic–Recent

Family of echinoderms

Psychocidaridae is a family of sea urchins in the order Cidaroida. The genus Psychocidaris is extant while the other genera are only known from fossils. The family has been in existence since the Lower Jurassic (Toarcian) and the range includes Europe, Ukraine, North America, North Africa and the West Pacific.

== Characteristics ==
All Cidaroids are regular and have the test composed of twenty columns of plates with two ambulacral columns alternating with two interambulacral columns. The pedicellariae are exclusively globiferous or tridentate. In addition, Psychocidarids are characterized by having no plates between the ambulacra. Instead they have a single primary tubercle with a large mamelon, the ball-like surface that articulates with the spine. In most genera this is imperforate and non-crenulate. The pores are in pairs that are not connected by grooves. The spines are broad and either spindle, gland or club-shaped.

== Genera ==
According to the World Register of Marine Species (WoRMS), the following genera are included in the family:

- Balanocidaris Lambert, 1910a †
- Caenocidaris Thiéry, 1928 †
- Oedematocidaris Smith & Wright, 1989 †
- Psychocidaris Ikeda, 1935
- Roseicidaris Vadet, 1991 †
- Sardocidaris Lambert, 1907 †
- Tylocidaris Pomel, 1883 †

Of these, Psychocidaris is the only extant genus while the other genera are known from fossils. The only living species and the type species of the genus is Psychocidaris ohshimai.

== Psychocidaris ohshimai ==
P. ohshimai is characterized by having gland-shaped spines on the apical (top) surface with a mat of hairs forming an overgrowth and by the oral spines having longitudinal flanges. It is found in the Philippines and the Bonin Islands, Japan.
