= Listonella =

Scientific classification
- Domain: Bacteria
- Kingdom: Pseudomonadati
- Phylum: Pseudomonadota
- Class: Gammaproteobacteria
- Order: Vibrionales
- Family: Vibrionaceae
- Genus: Listonella; MacDonell and Colwell 1986

Type species
- Listonella anguillarum

Species
- L. anguillarum L. pelagia

Genus of bacteria

Listonella is a genus of Gram-negative marine bacteria in the family Vibrionaceae named after the American microbiologist J. Liston. Analysis of phylogenetic, genomic and phenotypic data has shown the genus is not distinct from the genus Vibrio, so it is now considered a synonym of Vibrio.
