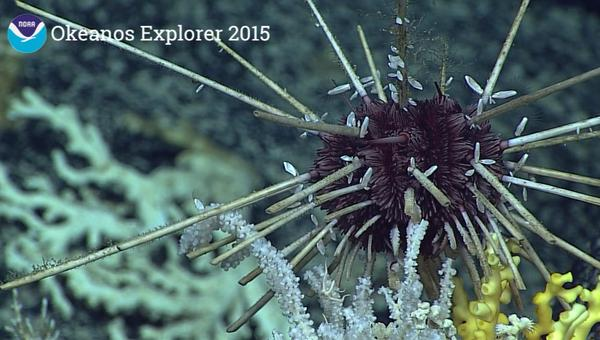
- Histocidaris variabilis seen off Hawaii by NOAA Okeanos Explorer mission

Scientific classification
- Domain: Eukaryota
- Kingdom: Animalia
- Phylum: Echinodermata
- Class: Echinoidea
- Order: Cidaroida
- Family: Histocidaridae
- Genus: Histocidaris; Mortensen, 1903

Species
- See text

Synonyms
- Cidaris (Histocidaris) Mortensen, 1903; Poriocidaris Mortensen, 1909; Porocidaris A. Agassiz, 1872

= Histocidaris =

Genus of sea urchins

Histocidaris is a genus of sea urchins in the family Histocidaridae. Some species are known from the fossil record.

== Species ==
- Histocidaris acutispina Mortensen, 1927
- Histocidaris australiae Mortensen, 1928
- Histocidaris carinata Mortensen, 1928
- Histocidaris cobosi (A. Agassiz, 1898)
- Histocidaris crassispina Mortensen, 1928
- Histocidaris denticulata Koehler, 1927
- Histocidaris elegans (A. Agassiz, 1879)
- Histocidaris formosa Mortensen, 1928
- Histocidaris geneffensis Lambert, 1932 †
- Histocidaris longicollis Hoggett & Rowe, 1986
- Histocidaris magnifica Mortensen, 1928
- Histocidaris mckayi Fell, 1954 †
- Histocidaris misakiensis (Yoshiwara, 1898)
- Histocidaris nuttingi Mortensen, 1926
- Histocidaris oranensis Lambert, 1931 †
- Histocidaris purpurata (Thomson, 1872)
- Histocidaris recurvata Mortensen, 1928
- Histocidaris sharreri (A. Agassiz, 1880)
- Histocidaris variabilis (A. Agassiz & H.L. Clark, 1907)
