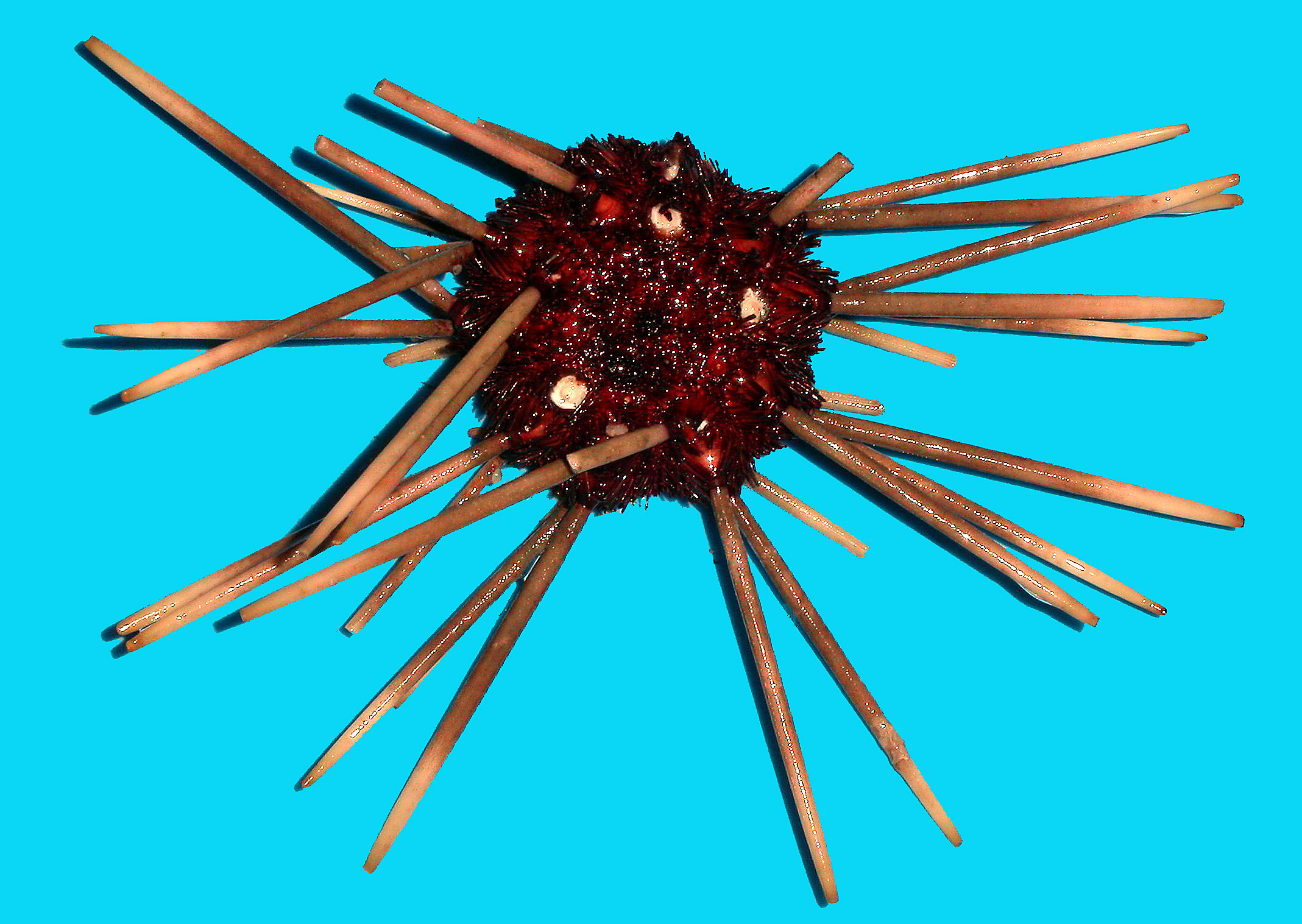

Scientific classification
- Kingdom: Animalia
- Phylum: Echinodermata
- Class: Echinoidea
- Order: Cidaroida
- Family: Ctenocidaridae
- Genus: Notocidaris; Mortensen, 1909

= Notocidaris =

Genus of sea urchins

Notocidaris is a genus of echinoderms belonging to the family Ctenocidaridae.

The species of this genus are found in the coasts of Antarctica and Southern Australia.

Species:

- Notocidaris bakeri McKnight, 1974
- Notocidaris gaussensis Mortensen, 1909
- Notocidaris hastata Mortensen, 1909
- Notocidaris lanceolata Mooi, David, Fell & Choné, 2000
- Notocidaris mortenseni (Koehler, 1900)
- Notocidaris platyacantha (H.L. Clark, 1925)
- Notocidaris remigera Mortensen, 1950
- Notocidaris vellai Fell, 1954
