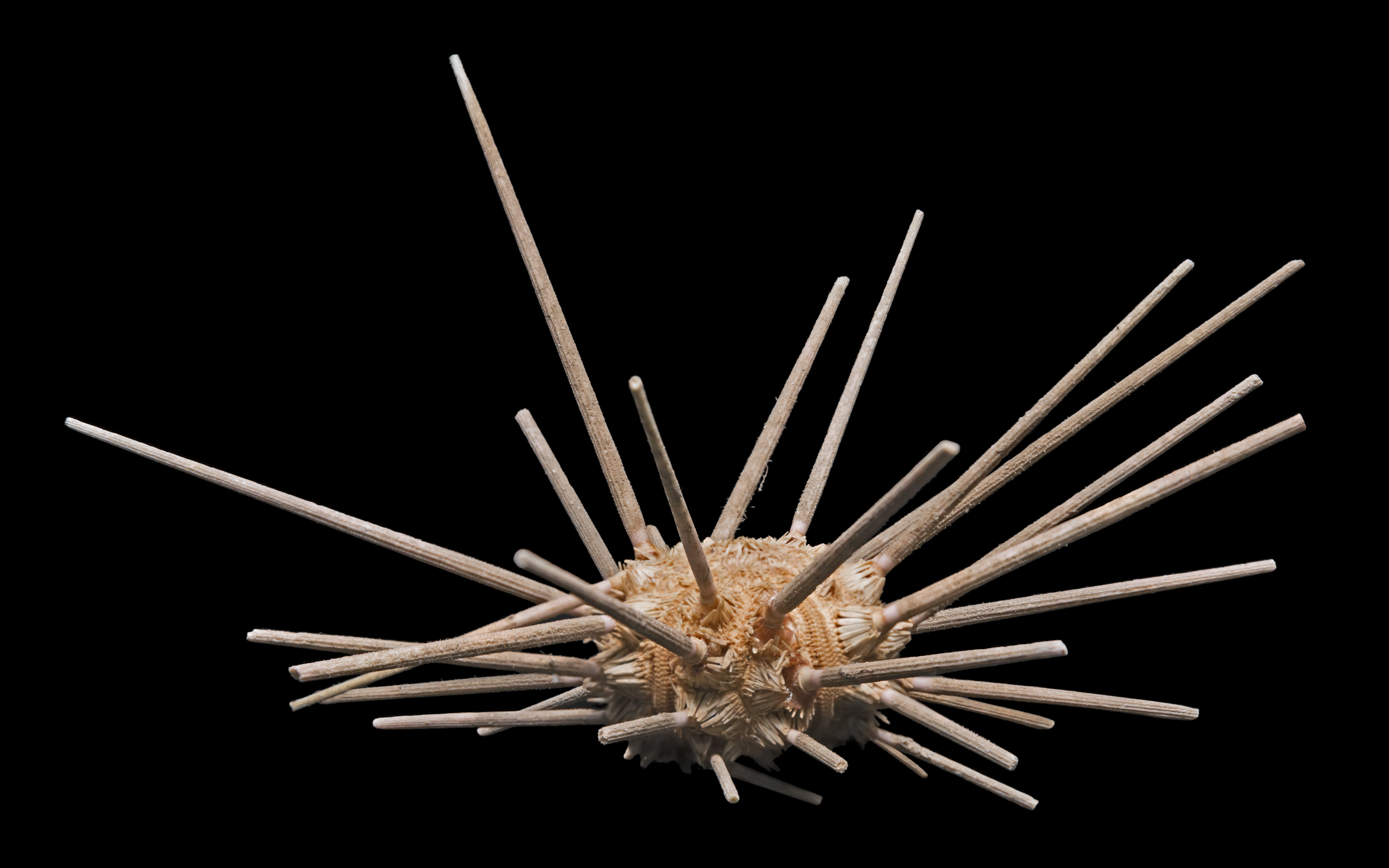
- Cidaris cidaris

Scientific classification
- Kingdom: Animalia
- Phylum: Echinodermata
- Class: Echinoidea
- Subclass: Perischoechinoidea; McCoy, 1849

Orders
- See text

= Perischoechinoidea =

Perischoechinoidea Temporal range: Middle Ordovician–Recent

Subclass of sea urchins

Perischoechinoidea is a subclass of primitive sea urchins that were abundant in the Palaeozoic seas. However, the great majority of species died out during the Mesozoic, as the more advanced euechinoid sea urchins became common. Today, only a single order, the Cidaroida, survives.

Most fossil forms had multiple columns of ambulacral plates, rather than the two rows found in all living species of sea urchin. They also lacked a perignathic girdle around the mouth.

== Taxonomy ==
The group is probably a paraphyletic assemblage of stem forms, united only by their lack of more advanced features, rather than a true taxonomic clade.

Subclass Perischoechinoidea

- Order Cidaroida
- Order Bothriocidaroida †
- Order Echinocystitoida †
- Order Megalopoda †
- Order Palaechinoida †
