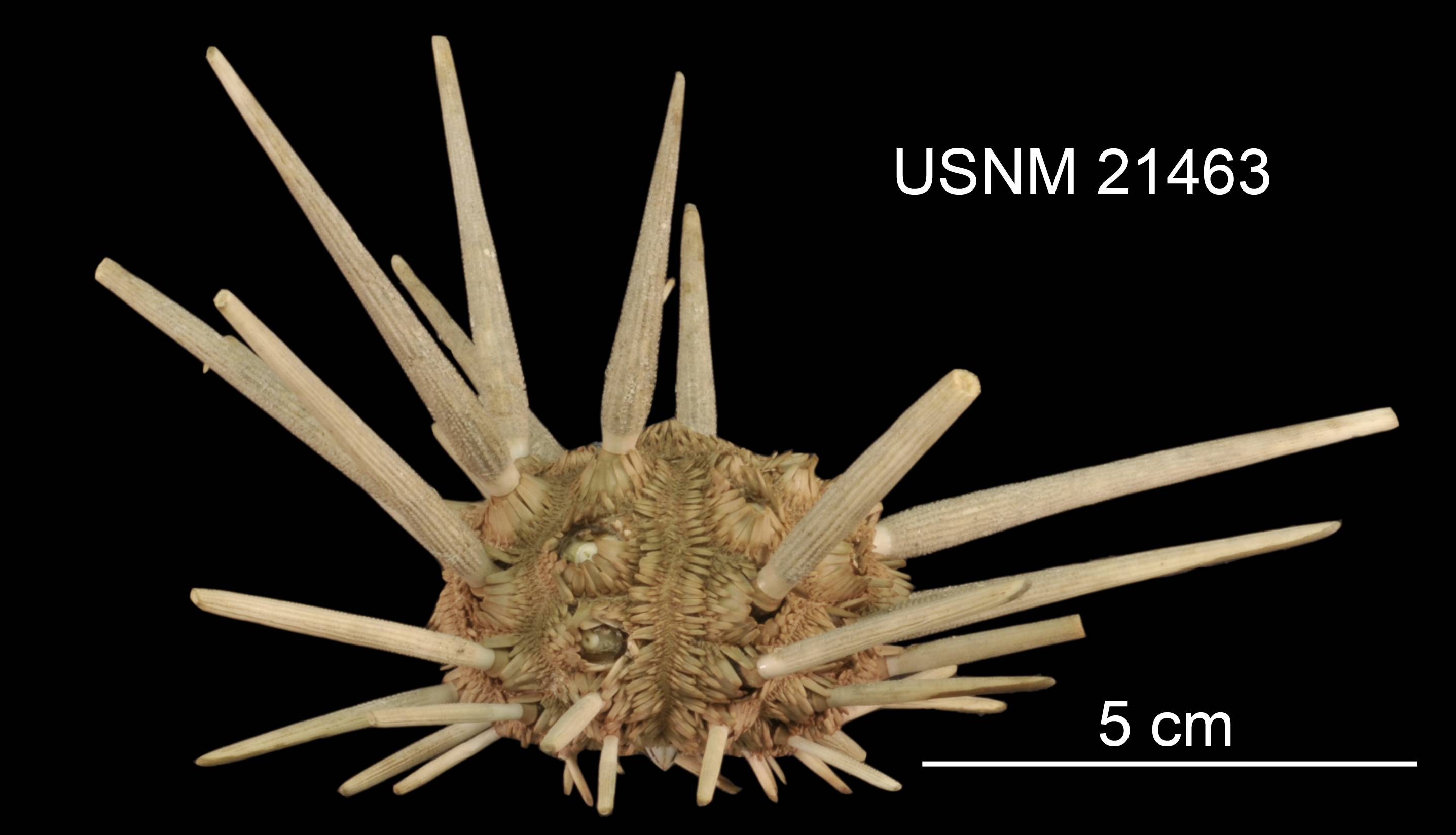

Scientific classification
- Kingdom: Animalia
- Phylum: Echinodermata
- Class: Echinoidea
- Order: Cidaroida
- Family: Cidaridae
- Genus: Cidaris
- Species: C. rugosa

Binomial name
- Cidaris rugosa Clark, 1907

= Cidaris rugosa =

Species of sea urchin

Cidaris rugosa is a species of sea urchins of the Family Cidaridae. Their armour is covered with spines. Cidaris rugosa was first described in 1907 by Hubert Lyman Clark as Dorocidaris rugosa.
