= Ulcer (disambiguation) =

An ulcer is a medical condition caused by a break in a bodily membrane.

Ulcer or ulceration may also refer to:

- Ulcer (dermatology), a sore on the skin or a mucous membrane
- Ulcerate, a New Zealand-based technical death metal band
- Fear Factory or Ulceration, an American industrial metal band

== See also ==
- Ulcer index, a stock market risk measure or technical analysis indicator devised by Peter Martin in 1987
