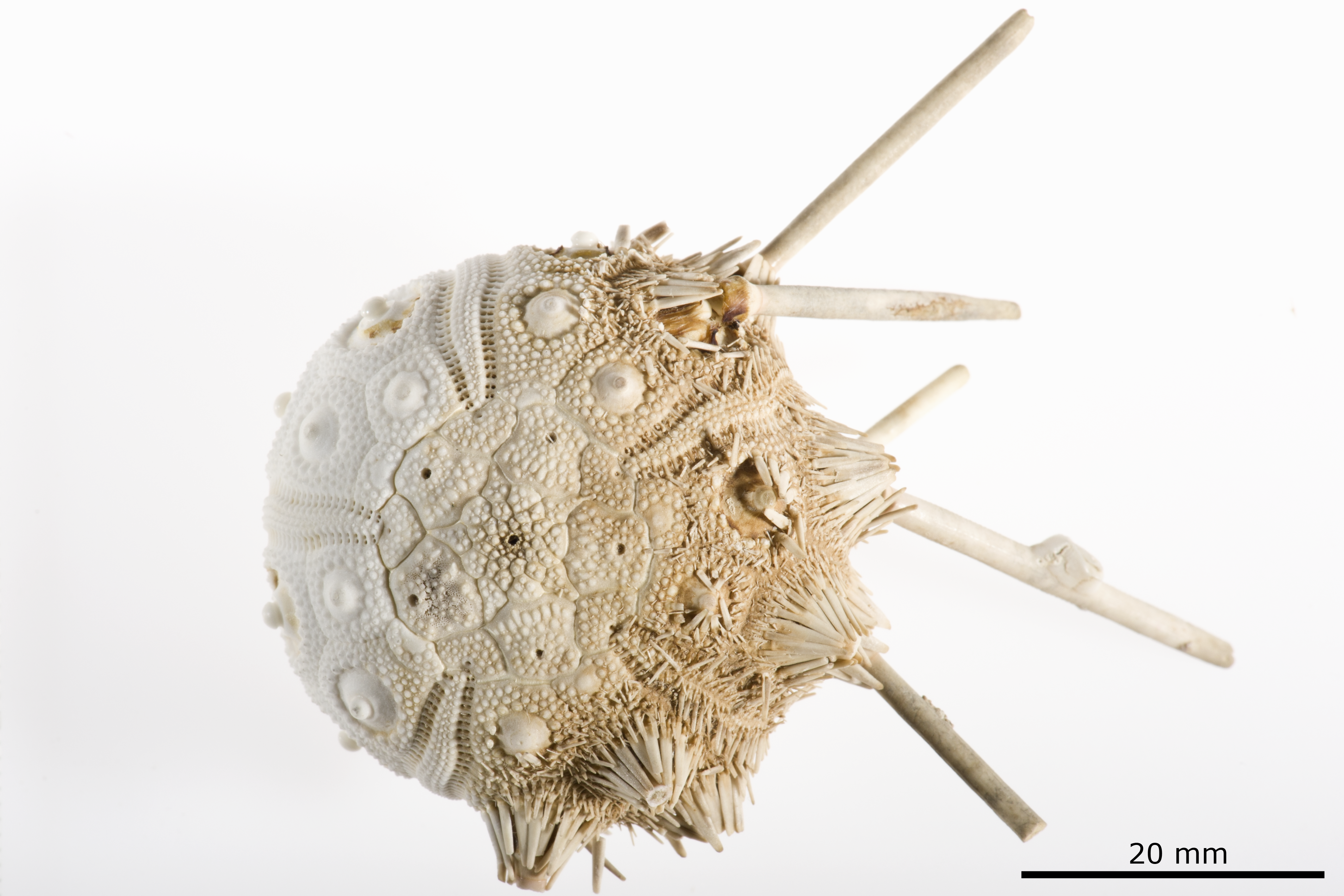

Conservation status
- Secure (NatureServe)

Scientific classification
- Kingdom: Animalia
- Phylum: Echinodermata
- Class: Echinoidea
- Order: Cidaroida
- Family: Cidaridae
- Genus: Cidaris
- Species: C. abyssicola

Binomial name
- Cidaris abyssicola (Agassiz, 1869)

= Cidaris abyssicola =

Species of sea urchin

Cidaris abyssicola is a species of sea urchin in the family Cidaridae. Cidaris abyssicola was first scientifically described in 1869 by Alexander Emanuel Agassiz.
