= Listonella anguillarum =

Scientific classification
- Domain: Bacteria
- Kingdom: Pseudomonadati
- Phylum: Pseudomonadota
- Class: Gammaproteobacteria
- Order: Vibrionales
- Family: Vibrionaceae
- Genus: Listonella
- Species: L. anguillarum

Binomial name
- Listonella anguillarum corrig. (Bergeman 1909); MacDonell and Colwell 1986

Synonyms
- Vibrio piscium David 1927; Achromobacter ichthyodermis Wells and ZoBell 1934; Pseudomonas ichthyodermis (Wells and ZoBell 1934) ZoBell and Upham 1944; Vibrio piscium var. japonicus Hoshina 1957; Vibrio ichthyodermis (Wells and ZoBell 1934) Shewan et al. 1960; Vibrio anguillarum Bergeman 1909; Listonella anguillara (sic) (Bergeman 1909) MacDonell and Colwell 1986

Species of bacterium

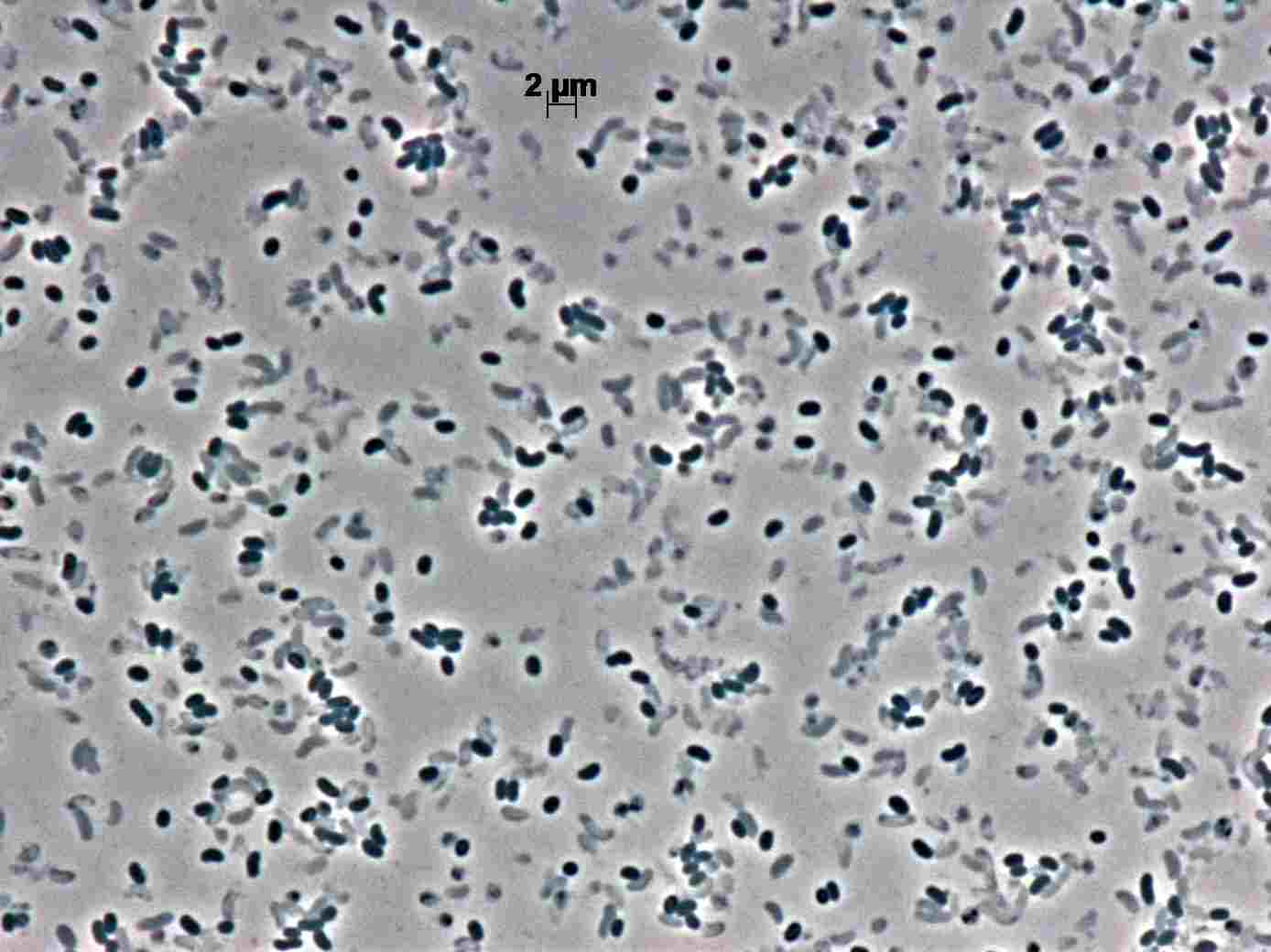
Living specimen of Vibrio anguillarum

Listonella anguillarum is a Gram-negative marine bacterium in the family Vibrionaceae. The correct nomenclature for this bacterium is Vibrio anguillarum.
