= Echinocystitoida =

Scientific classification
- Domain: Eukaryota
- Kingdom: Animalia
- Phylum: Echinodermata
- Class: Echinoidea
- Subclass: Perischoechinoidea
- Order: †Echinocystitoida

Extinct order of sea urchins

Echinocystitoida were an order of extinct sea urchin in the subclass Perischoechinoidea.
