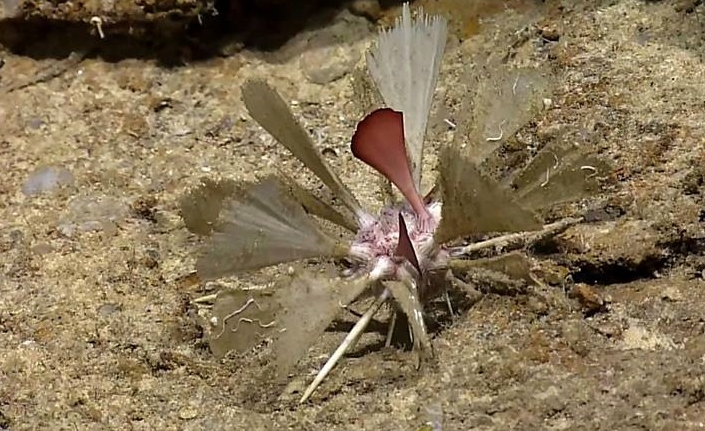
- In the abyss of the Gulf of Mexico

Scientific classification
- Kingdom: Animalia
- Phylum: Echinodermata
- Class: Echinoidea
- Order: Cidaroida
- Family: Cidaridae
- Genus: Cidaris
- Species: C. blakei

Binomial name
- Cidaris blakei (Agassiz, 1878)

= Cidaris blakei =

Species of sea urchin

Cidaris blakei is a species of sea urchins of the family Cidaridae. Its armour is covered with spines of three types, one unique type being extended and fan-like, making it easily recognized. Alexander Agassiz first described it scientifically in 1878. It is present on the seabed in deep waters in the Gulf of Mexico and the Bahamas.

== Taxonomy ==
Cidaris blakei was first described by the American zoologist Alexander Agassiz in 1878. It was among many deep sea animals dredged up from abyssal depths in the Gulf of Mexico during the explorations of the USC&GS George S. Blake, one of the first United States oceanographic research vessels, and from which it derives its specific name. The genus name is Latin for a headdress or tiara worn by ancient Persian kings.

== Description ==
Although their appearance is quite variable, other members of the genus Cidaris have long cylindrical blunt or pointed spines that are not covered with skin as are most sea urchin spines. As a result, barnacles, tube worms and other epizoic organisms grow on them. The spines of C. blakei are present in three different forms, one form being broad, flat and paddle-shaped. They are also naked and epizoics grow on them, but the function of these strange-shaped spines is unclear.

== Distribution ==
This sea urchin is found in the tropical western Atlantic Ocean. Its range includes the Gulf of Mexico and deepwater areas off the Bahamas, where they were collected from the seabed at depths of around 600 m (2,000 ft).

== Ecology ==
Larvae of C. blakei are planktotrophic, that is to say they spend a long time living in the water column, taking four months to develop from egg to metamorphosis, and as a result can disperse widely. During this time they are sustained at first by the egg yolk, and later feed on zooplankton and phytoplankton. However, researchers think that they would be unlikely to survive the warmer temperatures present higher in the water column, and are therefore unable to migrate vertically.
