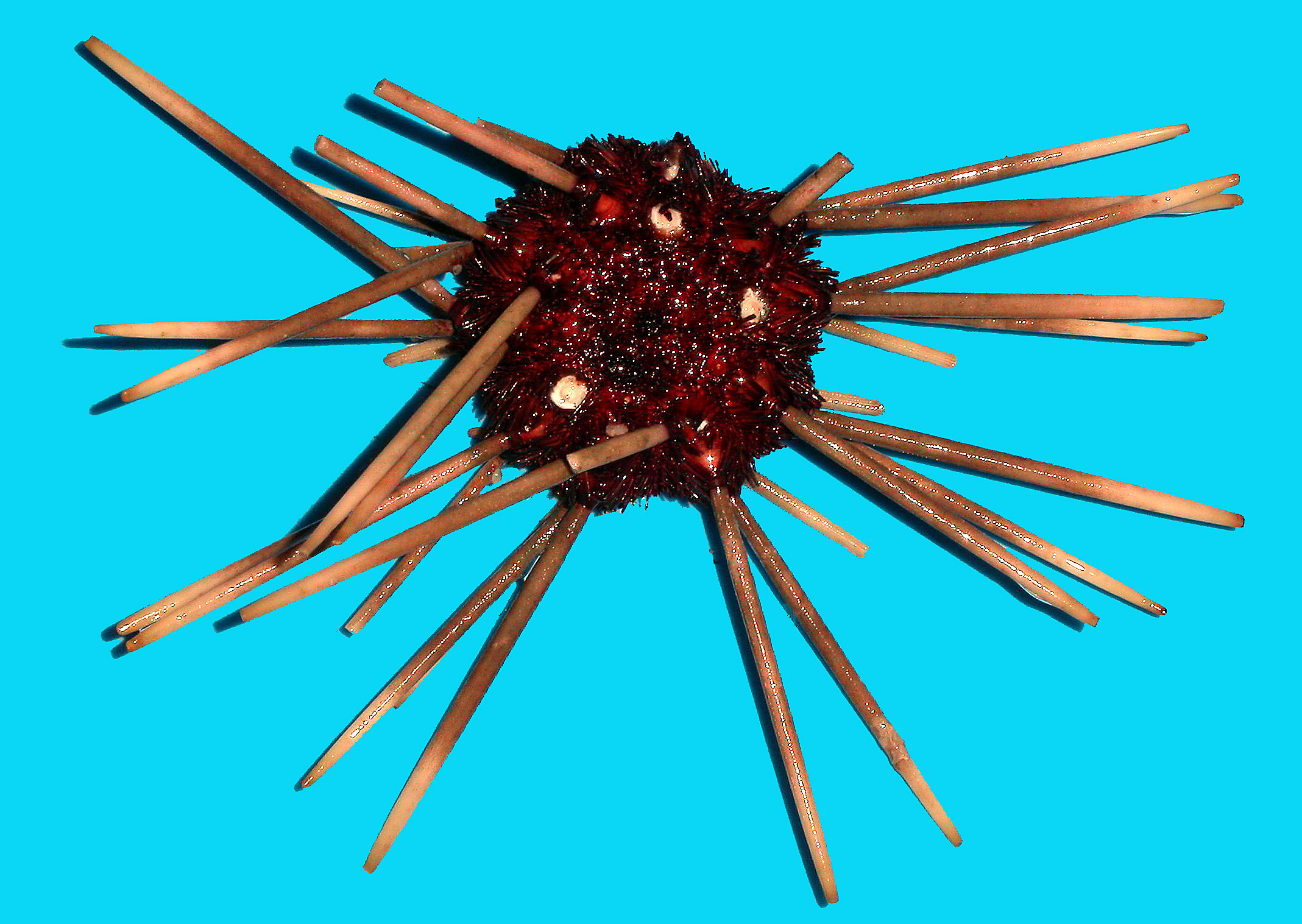
- Notocidaris

Scientific classification
- Kingdom: Animalia
- Phylum: Echinodermata
- Class: Echinoidea
- Order: Cidaroida
- Superfamily: Cidaroidea
- Family: Ctenocidaridae; Mortensen, 1928

= Ctenocidaridae =

Family of sea urchins

Ctenocidaridae is a family of echinoderms belonging to the order Cidaroida.

Genera:

- Aporocidaris Agassiz & Clark, 1907
- Ctenocidaris Mortensen, 1910
- Homalocidaris Mortensen, 1928
- Notocidaris Mortensen, 1909
- Rhynchocidaris Mortensen, 1909
