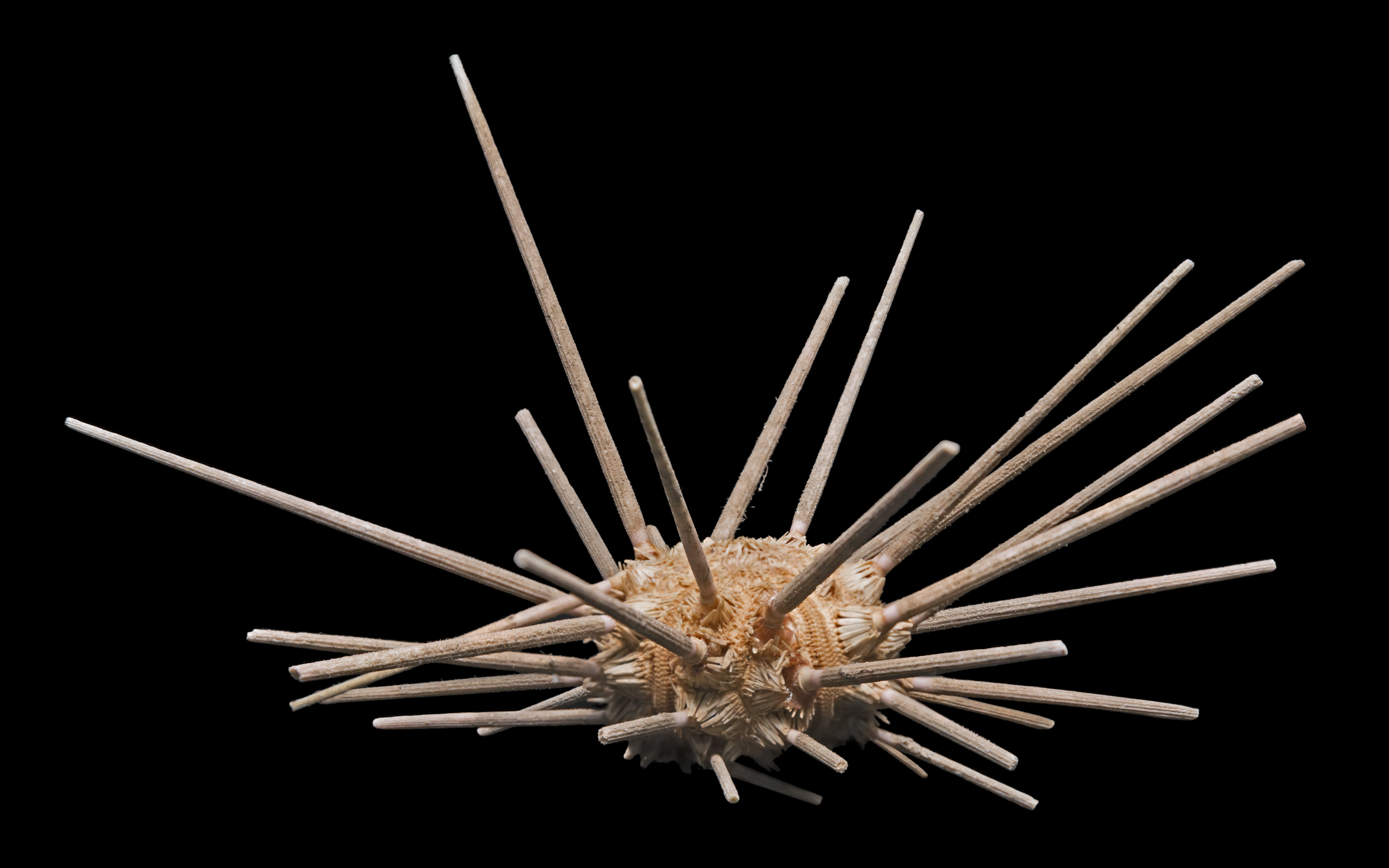
- Cidaris cidaris

Scientific classification
- Kingdom: Animalia
- Phylum: Echinodermata
- Class: Echinoidea
- Subclass: Perischoechinoidea
- Order: Cidaroida; Claus, 1880

Families
- See text

= Cidaroida =

Cidaroida Temporal range: Lower Permian–Recent

Order of sea urchins

Cidaroida, also known as pencil urchins, is an order of primitive sea urchins, the only living order of the subclass Perischoechinoidea. All other orders of this subclass, which were even more primitive than the living forms, became extinct during the Mesozoic.

== Description ==
Their primary spines are much more widely separated than in other sea urchins, and they have no buccal slits. Other primitive features include relatively simple plates in the test, and the ambulacral plates continuing as a series across the membrane that surrounds the mouth.

== Families ==
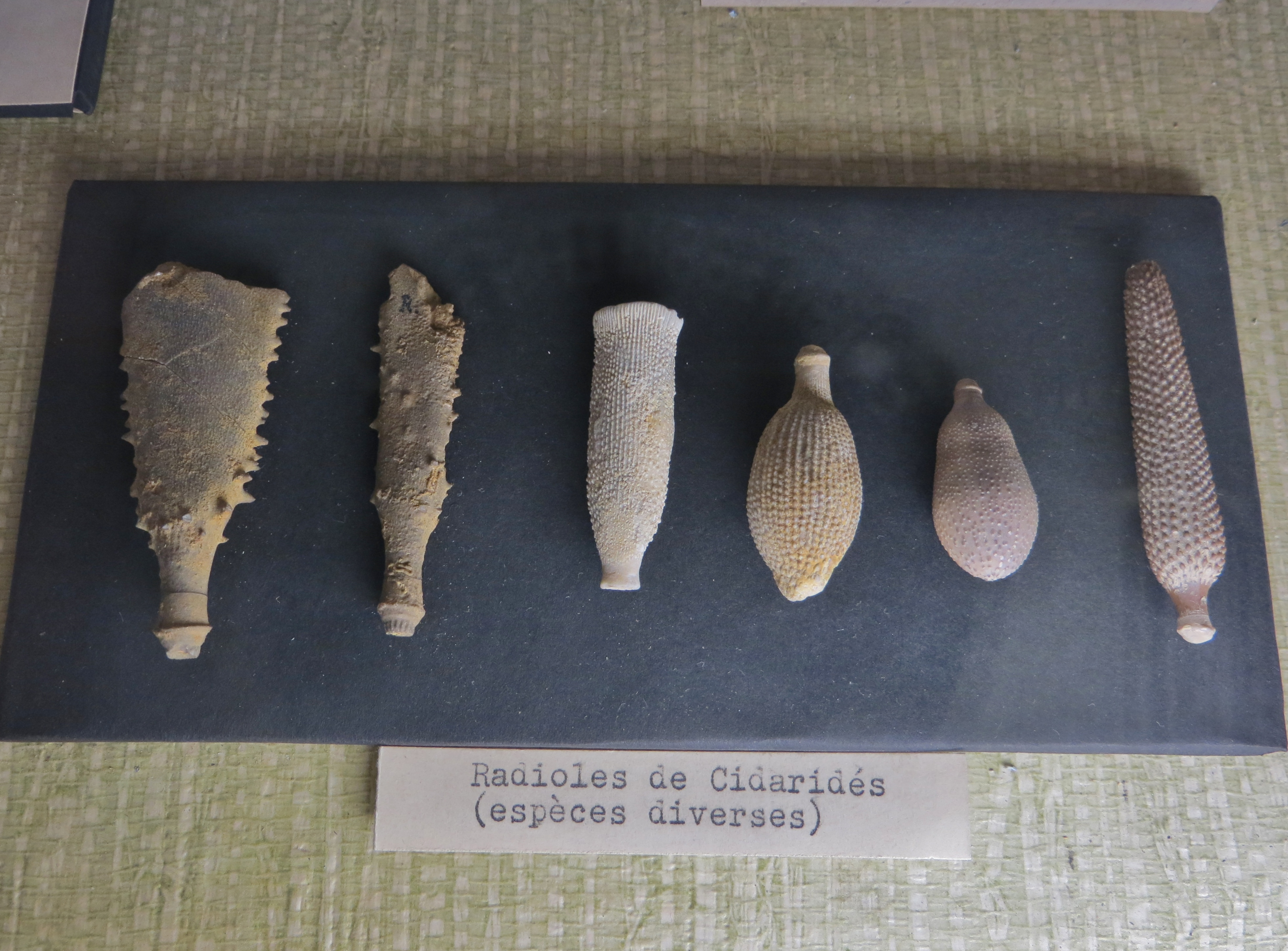
Many different fossil cidaroid radiola (spines) at the MNHN

According to World Register of Marine Species:

- family Anisocidaridae Vadet, 1999 †
- superfamily Cidaroidea Gray, 1825
  - family Cidaridae Gray, 1825
  - family Ctenocidaridae Mortensen, 1928a
  - family Paurocidaridae Vadet, 1999a †
- family Diplocidaridae Gregory, 1900 †
- family Heterocidaridae Mortensen, 1934 †
- superfamily Histocidaroidea Lambert, 1900
  - family Histocidaridae Lambert, 1900
  - family Psychocidaridae Ikeda, 1936
- family Miocidaridae Durham & Melville, 1957 †
- family Polycidaridae Vadet, 1988 †
- family Rhabdocidaridae Lambert, 1900 †
- family Serpianotiaridae Hagdorn, 1995 †
- family Triadocidaridae Smith, 1994c †
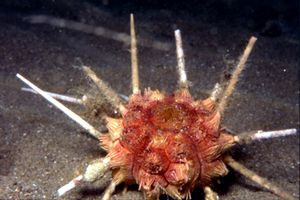
Stylocidaris affinis (Cidaridae)

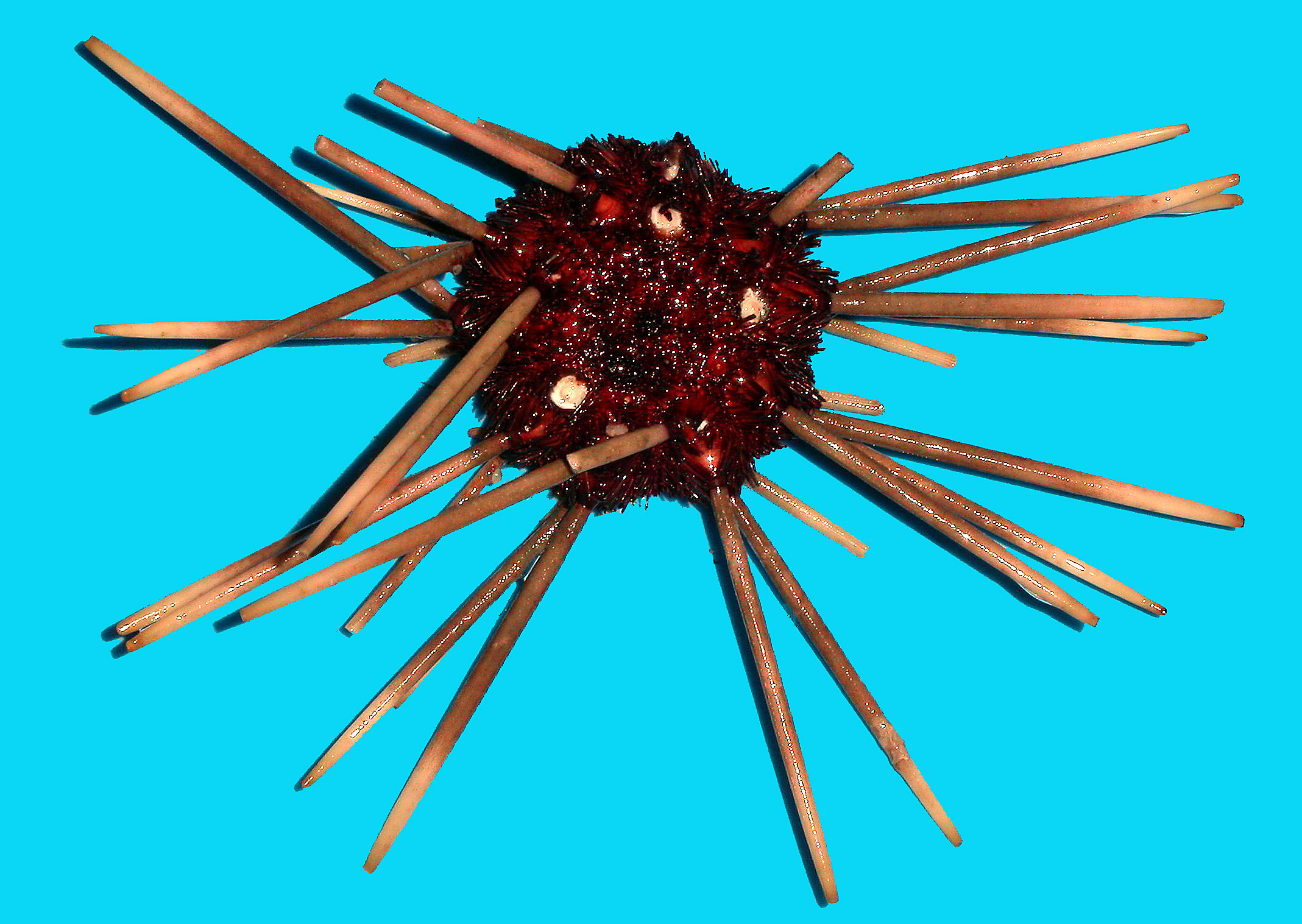
Notocidaris sp. (Ctenocidaridae)

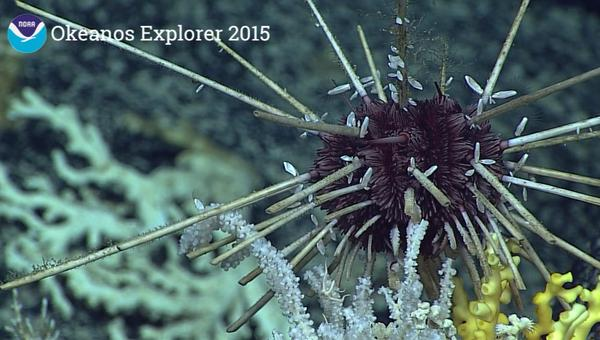
Histocidaris variabilis (Histocidaridae)

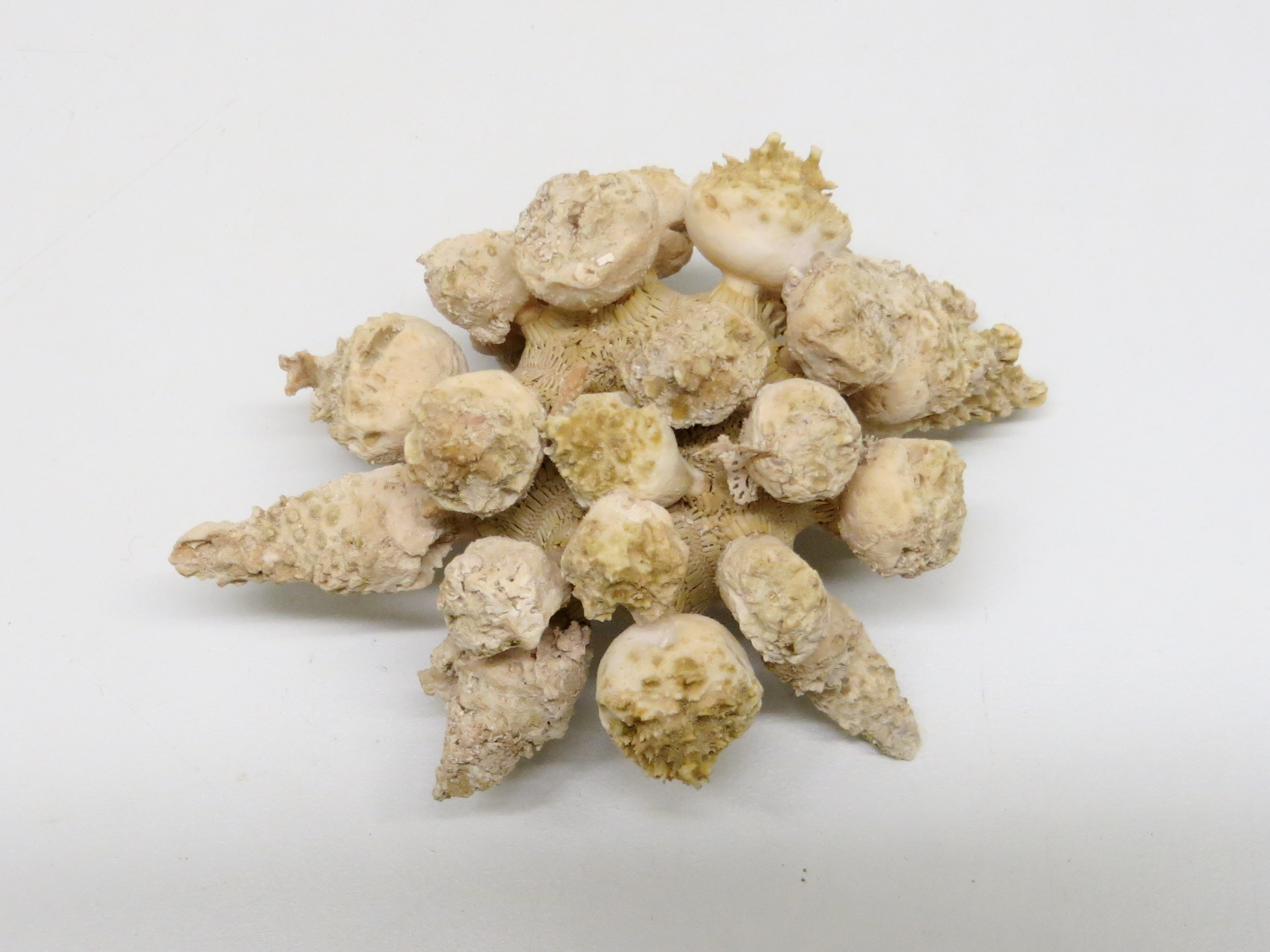
Tylocidaris ohshimai (Psychocidaridae)

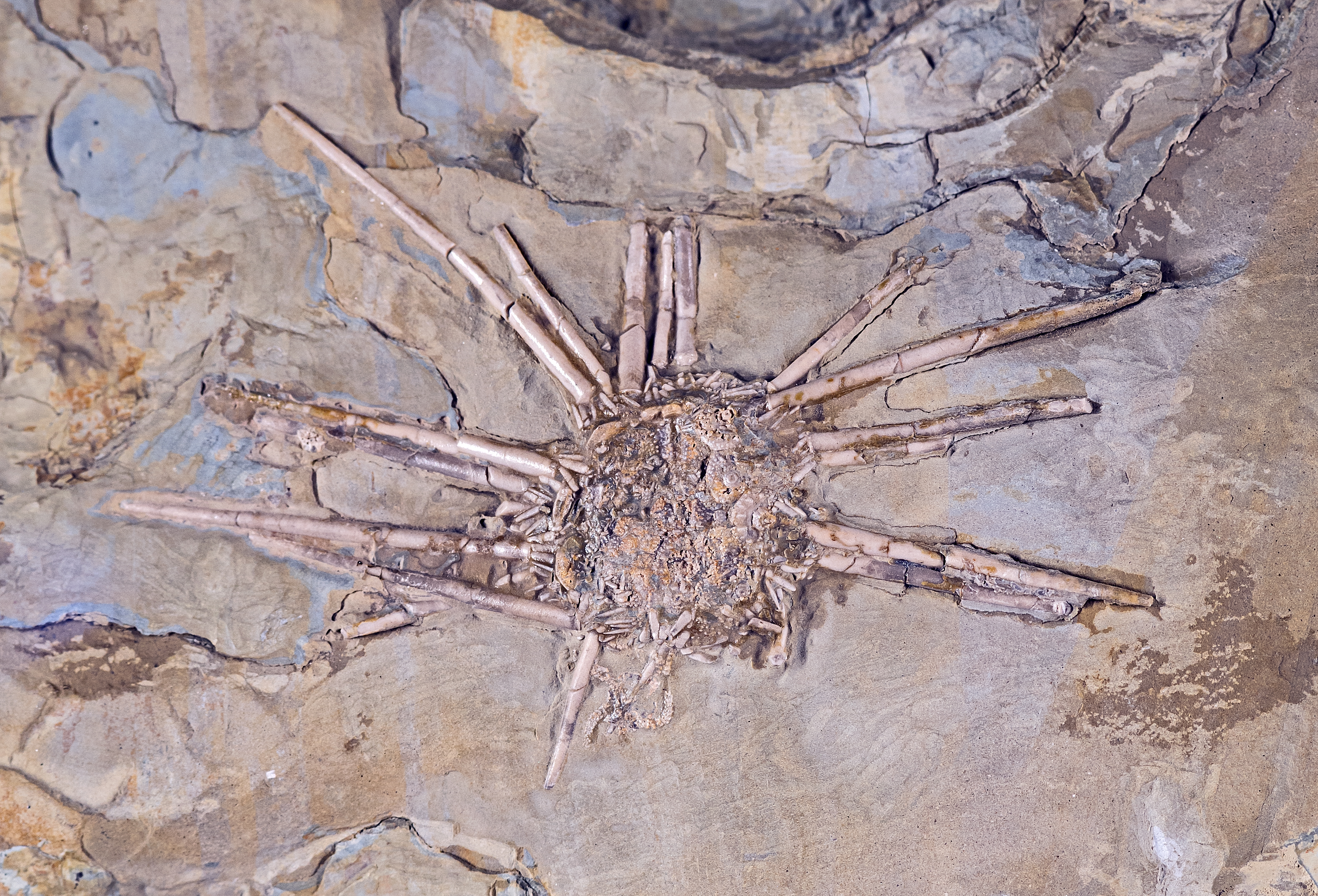
Miocidaris coaeva (Miocidaridae, fossil)

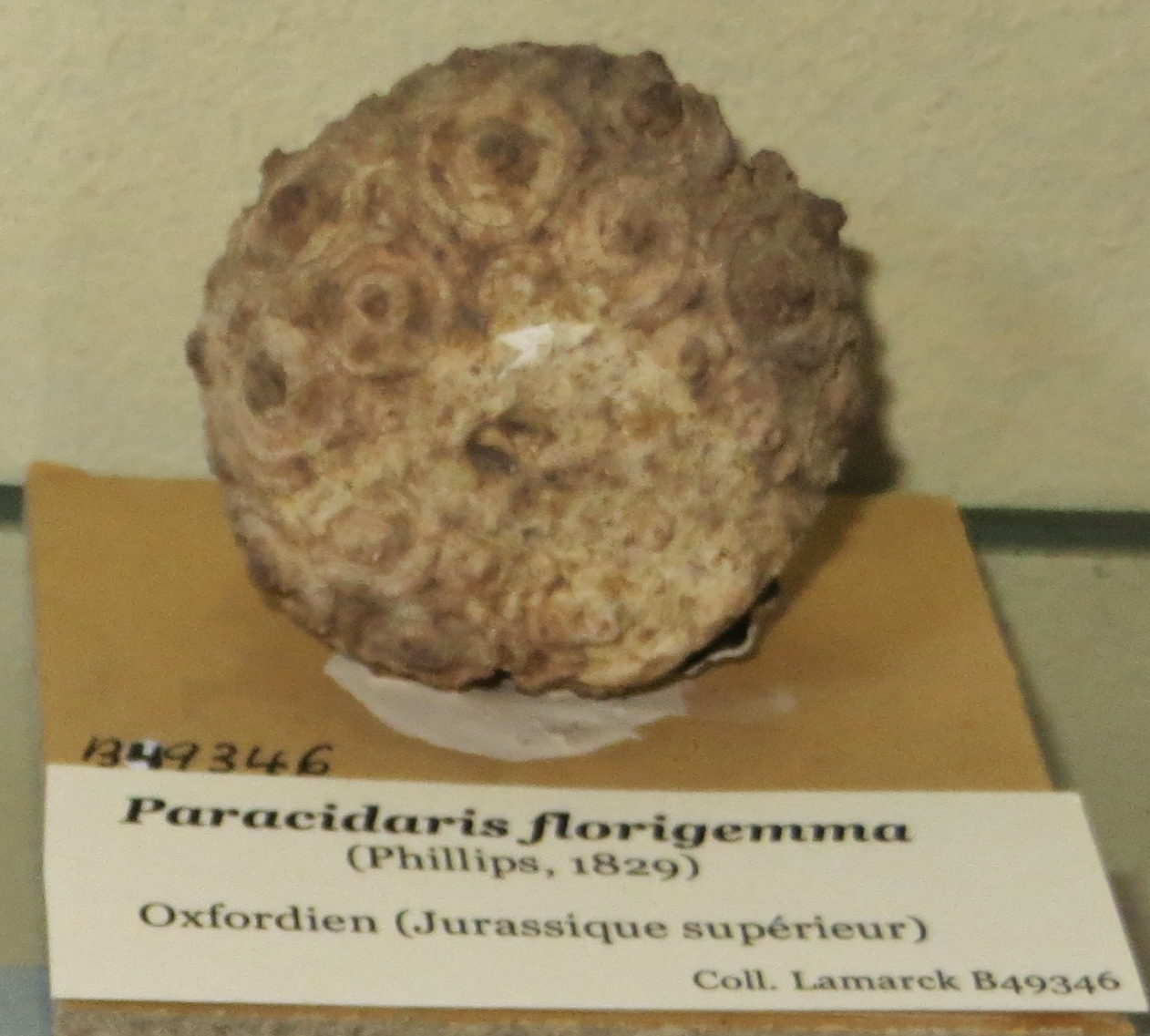
Paracidaris florigemma (Polycidaridae, fossil)
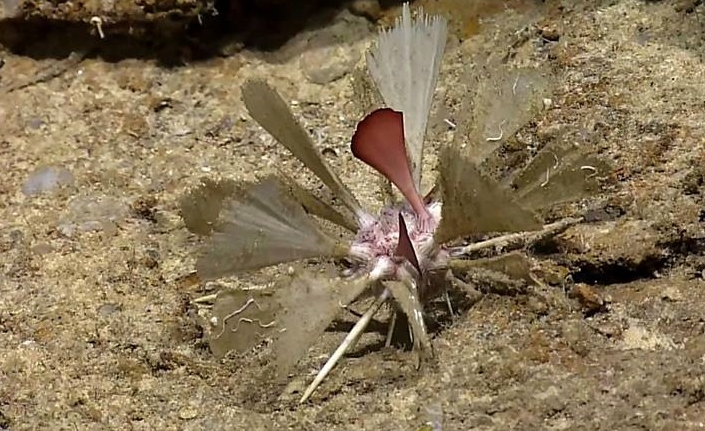
Cidaris blakei, abyssal Caribbean species

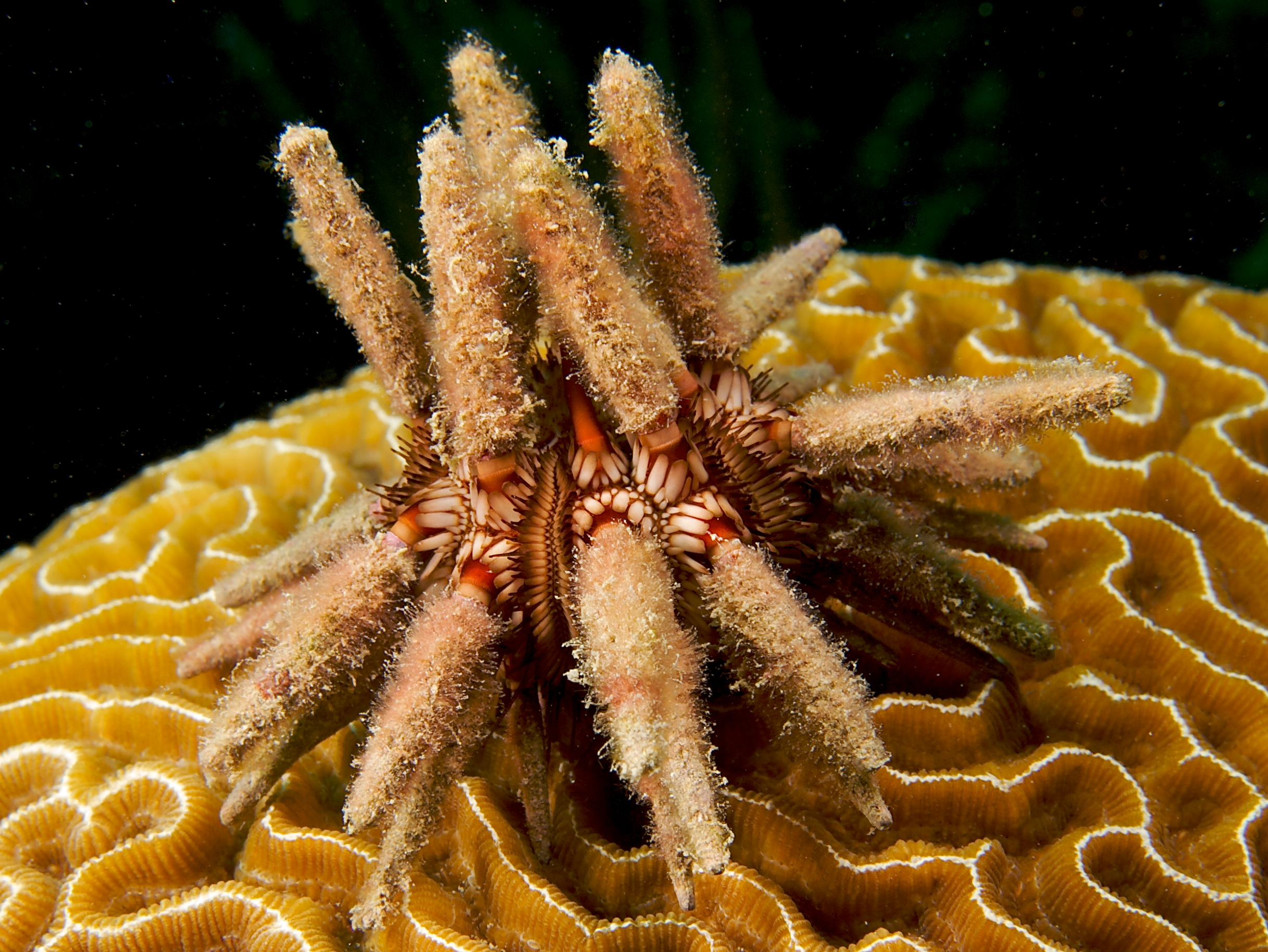
Eucidaris tribuloides, shallow Caribbean species

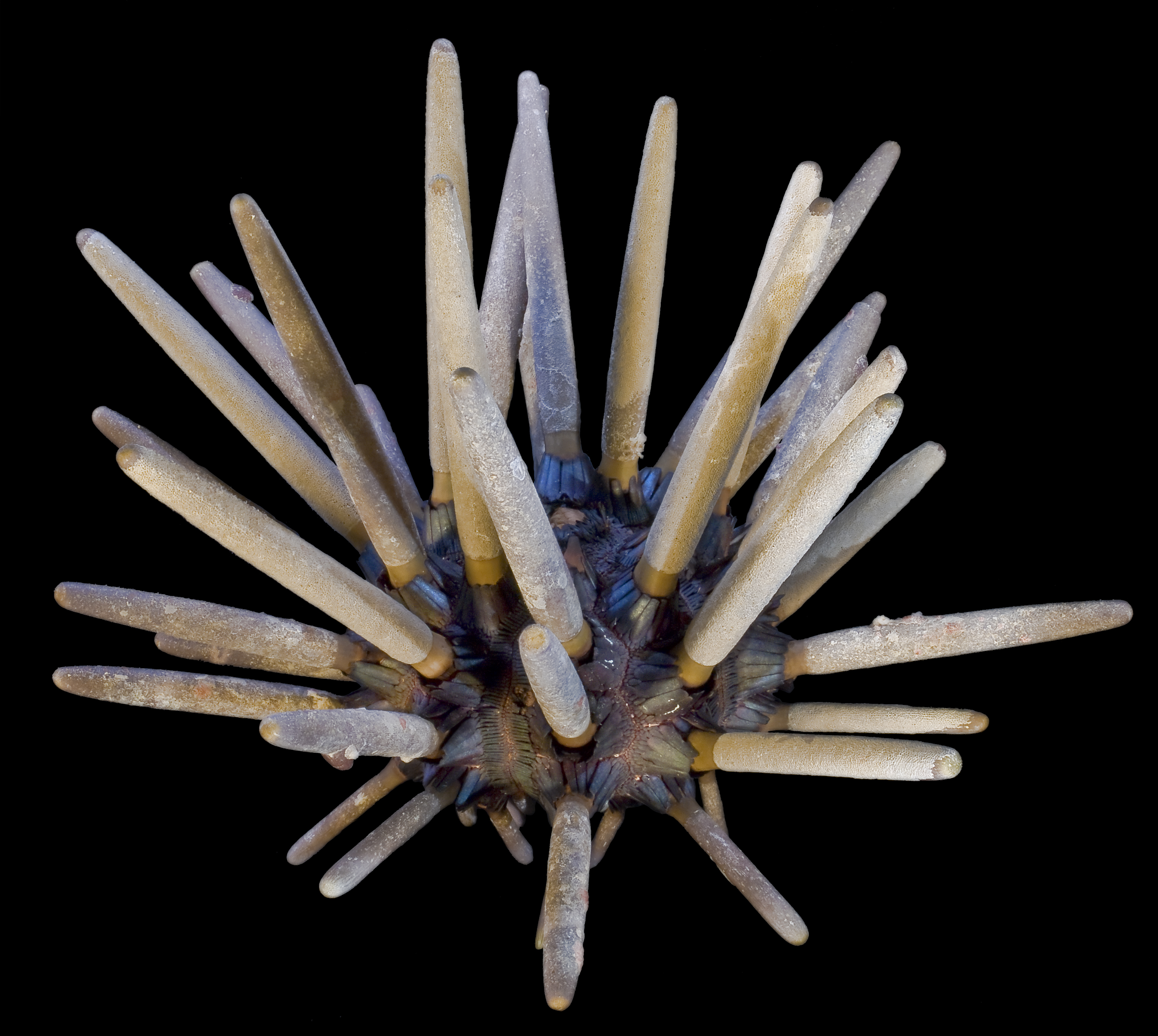
Phyllacanthus imperialis, shallow Indo-Pacific species

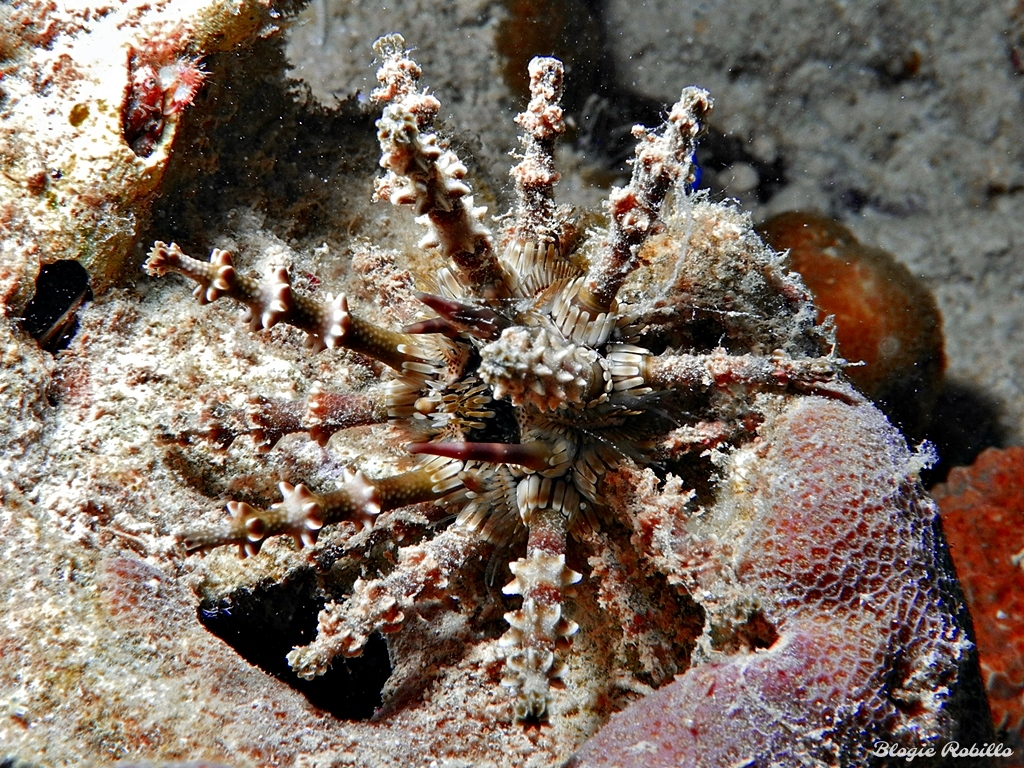
Plococidaris verticillata, rare shallow Indo-Pacific species

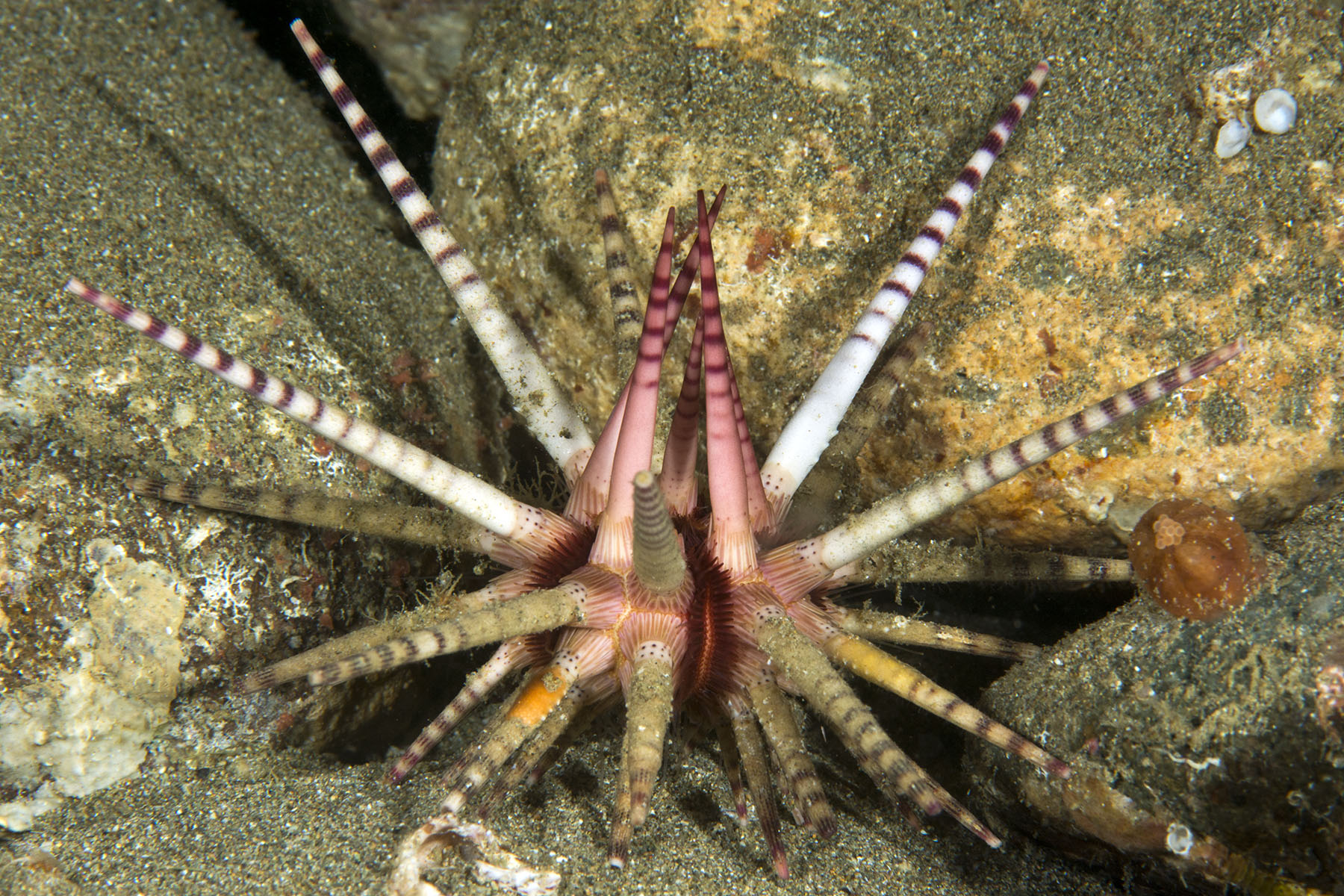
Prionocidaris baculosa, from Philippines

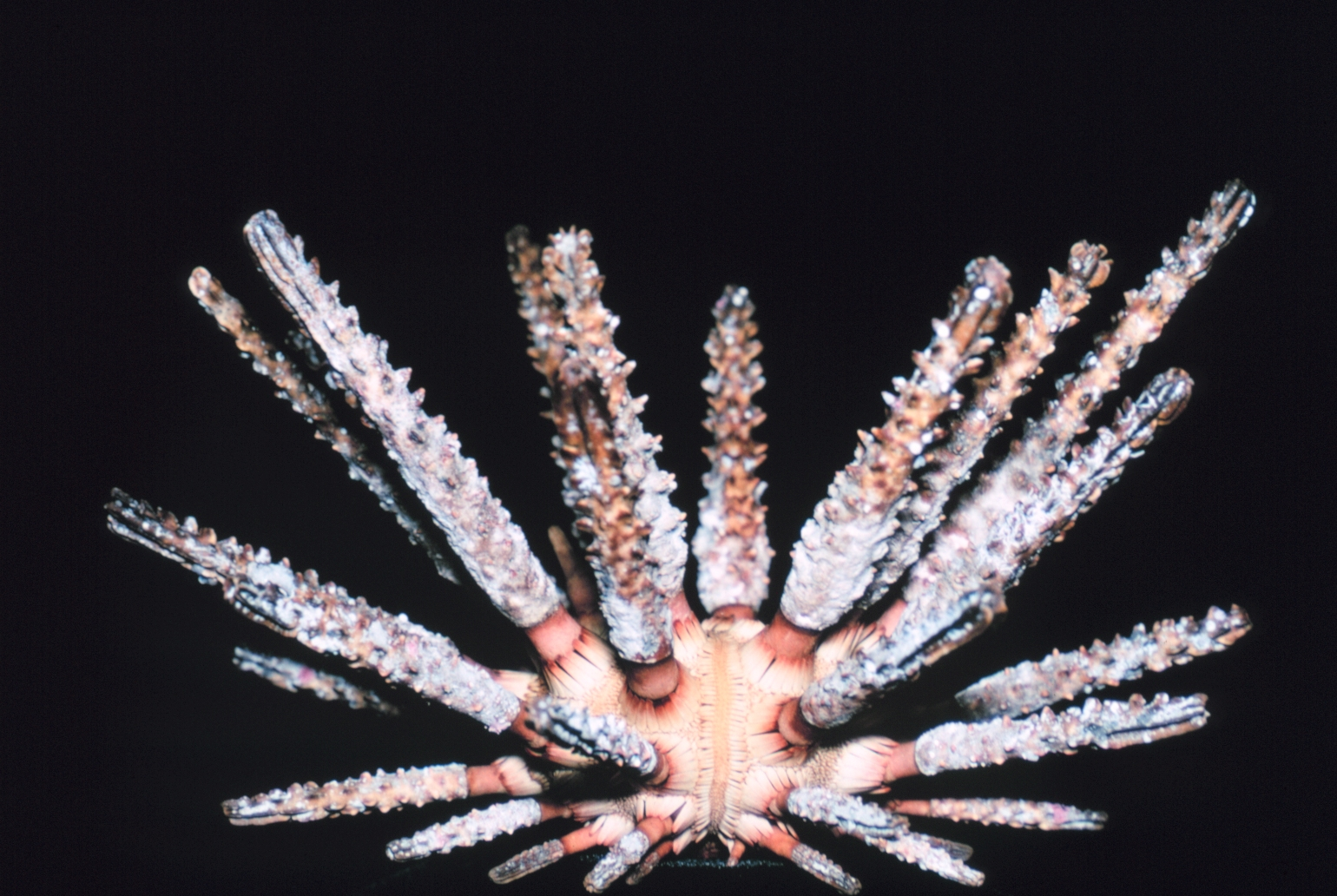
Chondrocidaris gigantea, from Hawaii
