= A. punctulata =

A. punctulata may refer to:

- Aethalura punctulata, the grey birch, a moth species found in Europe
- Arbacia punctulata, a sea urchin species
