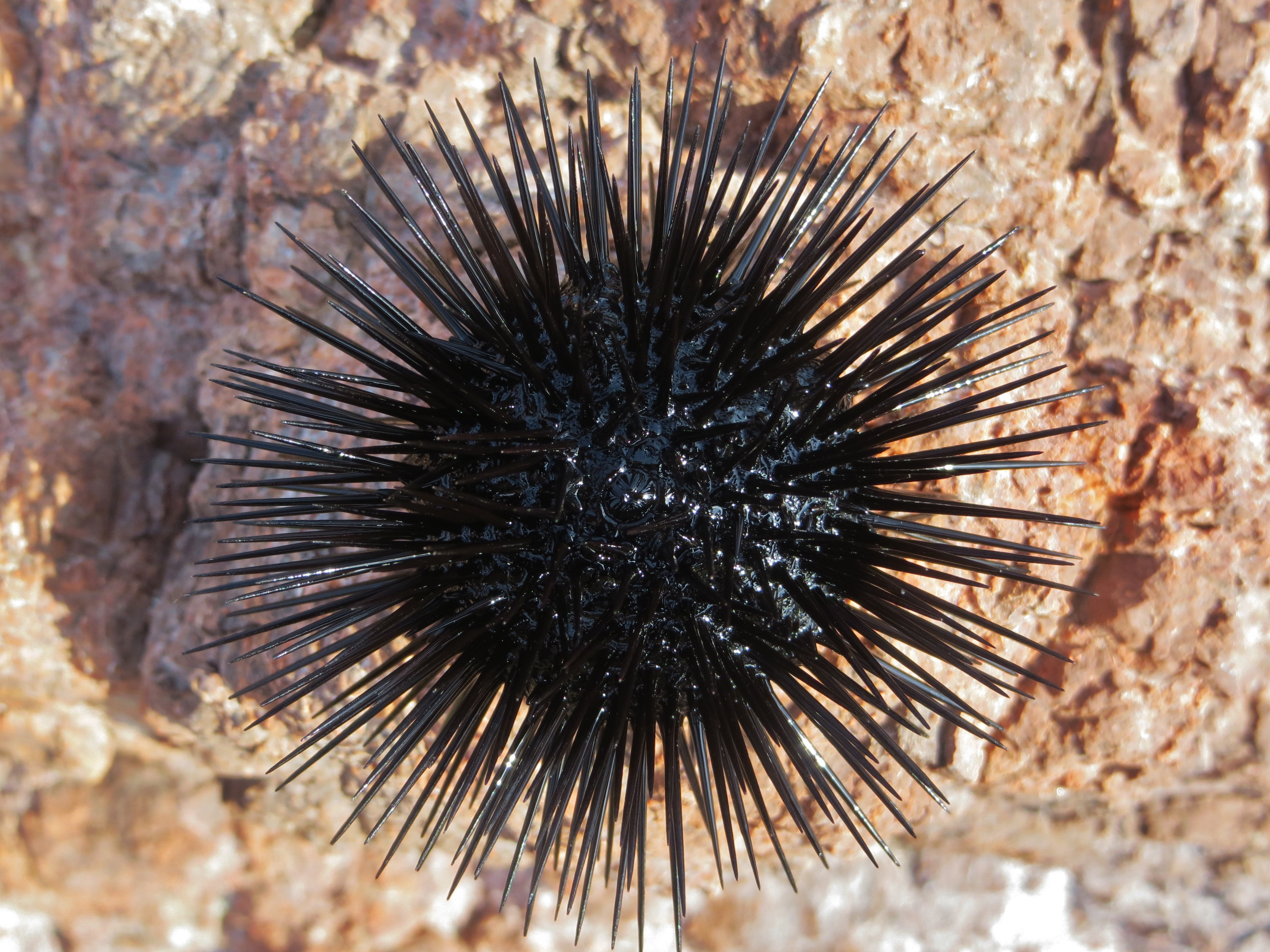
- Arbacia lixula from the Mediterranean

Scientific classification
- Kingdom: Animalia
- Phylum: Echinodermata
- Class: Echinoidea
- Order: Arbacioida
- Family: Arbaciidae
- Genus: Arbacia
- Species: A. lixula

Binomial name
- Arbacia lixula (Linnaeus, 1758)

= Arbacia lixula =

Arbacia lixula Temporal range: Late Piacenzian or early Gelasian - recent

Species of sea urchin

Arbacia lixula, the black sea urchin, is a species of sea urchin from Europe.

== Description ==
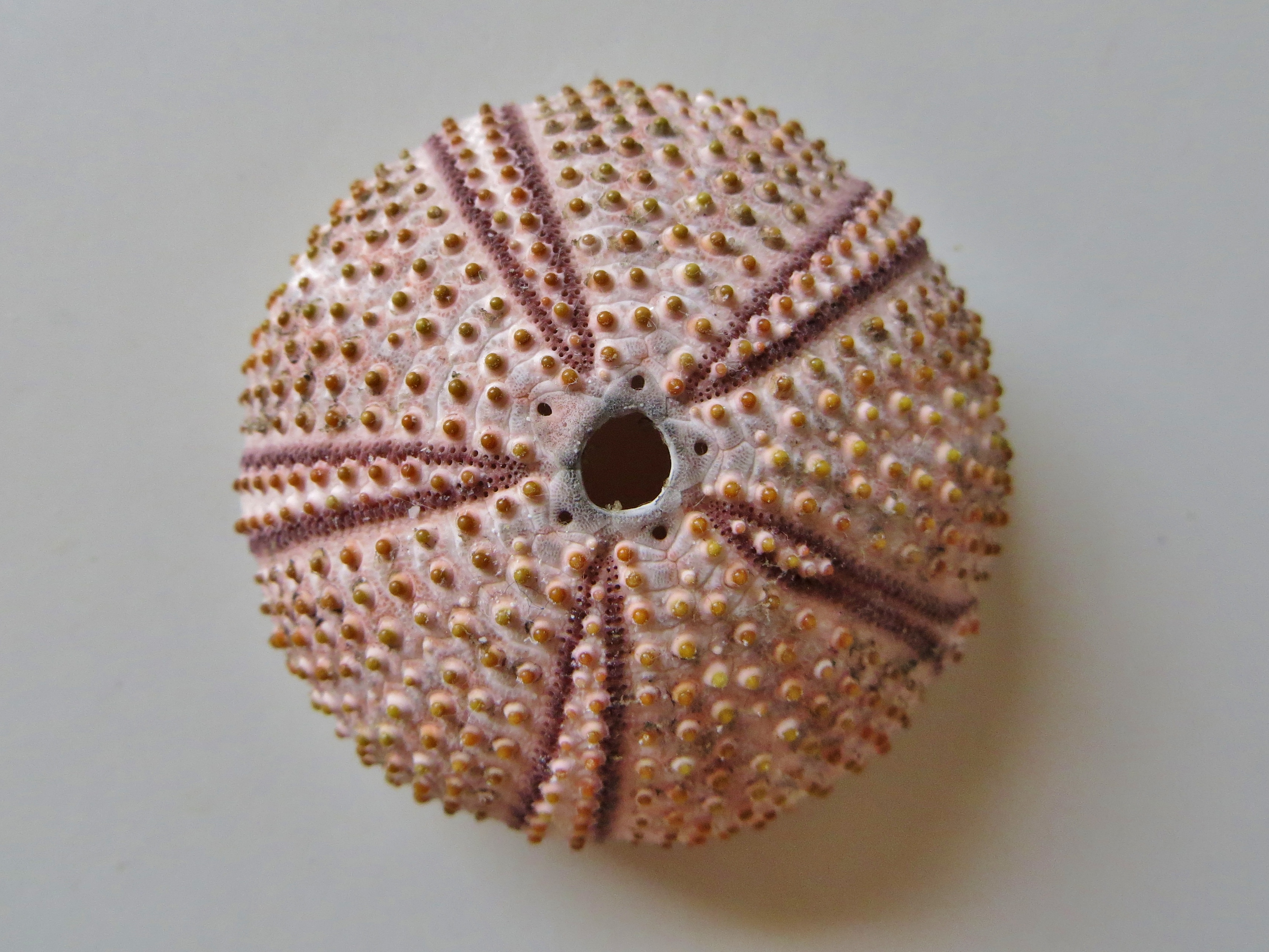
Test (shell) of a A. lixula

It is a medium-sized sea urchin, characterized by its deep black color and its hemispherical shape. All of its spines are roughly the same size (no "secondary spines"), and worn erected (never dishevelled when in the water). The anus on the top is surrounded by four plates forming an anal valve. The oral face is nearly naked, the mouth being surrounded by soft, dark-greenish skin.

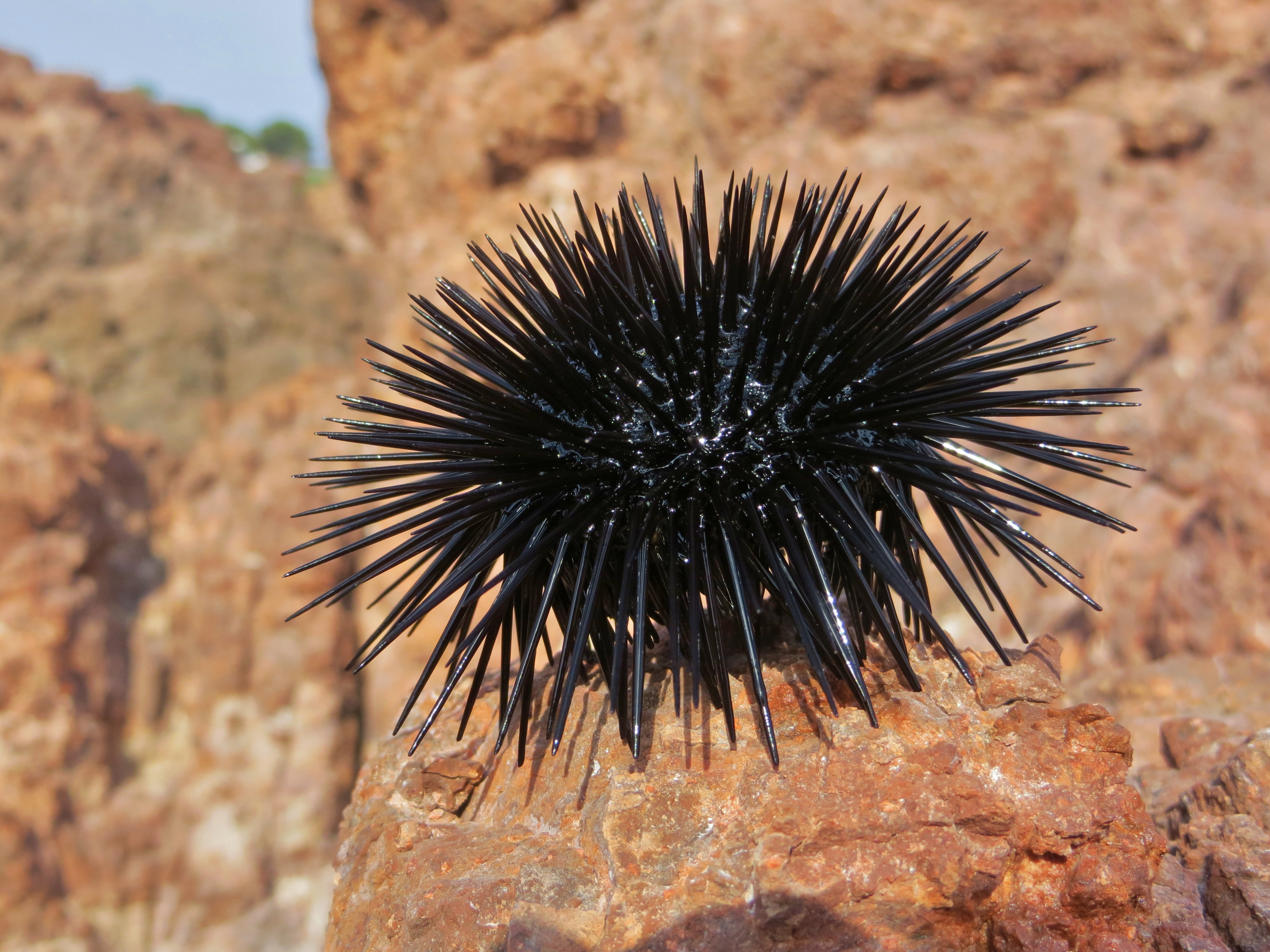
Profile

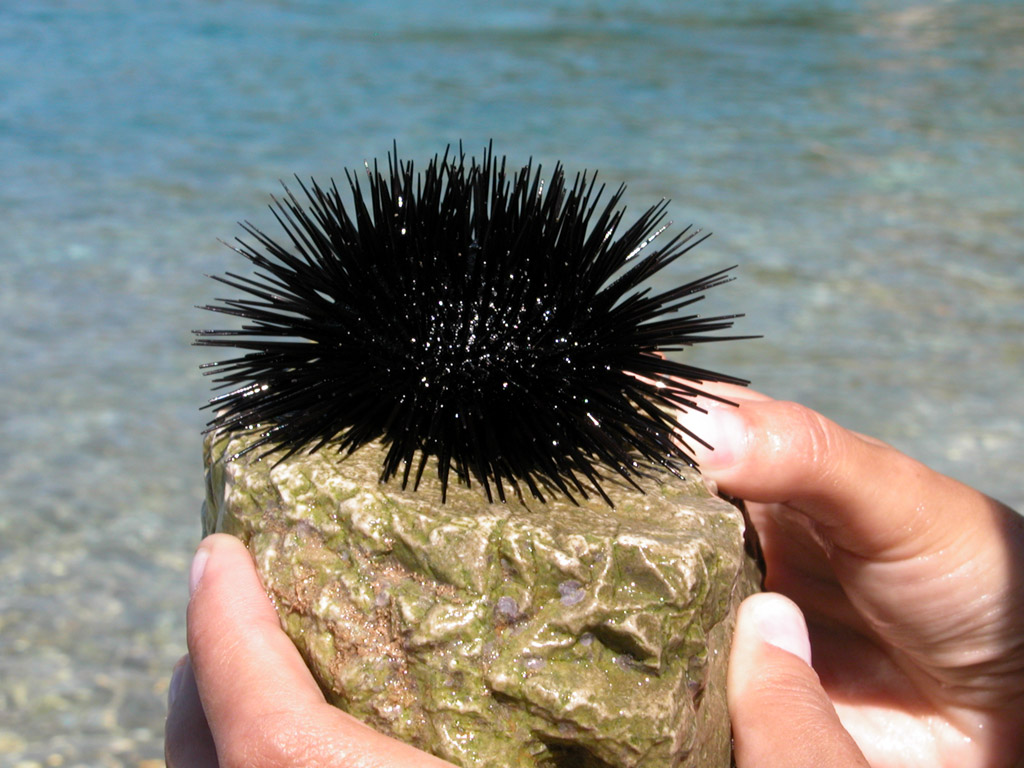
Sticking on a rock

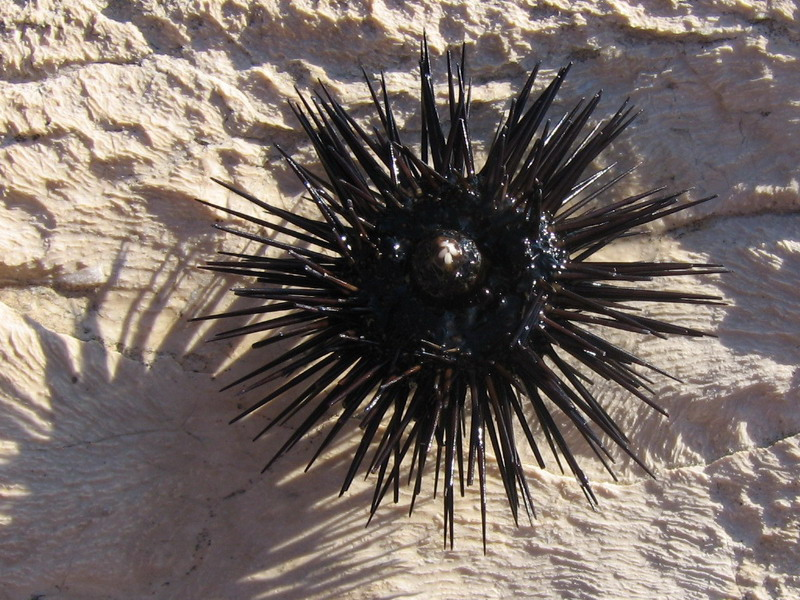
Oral face

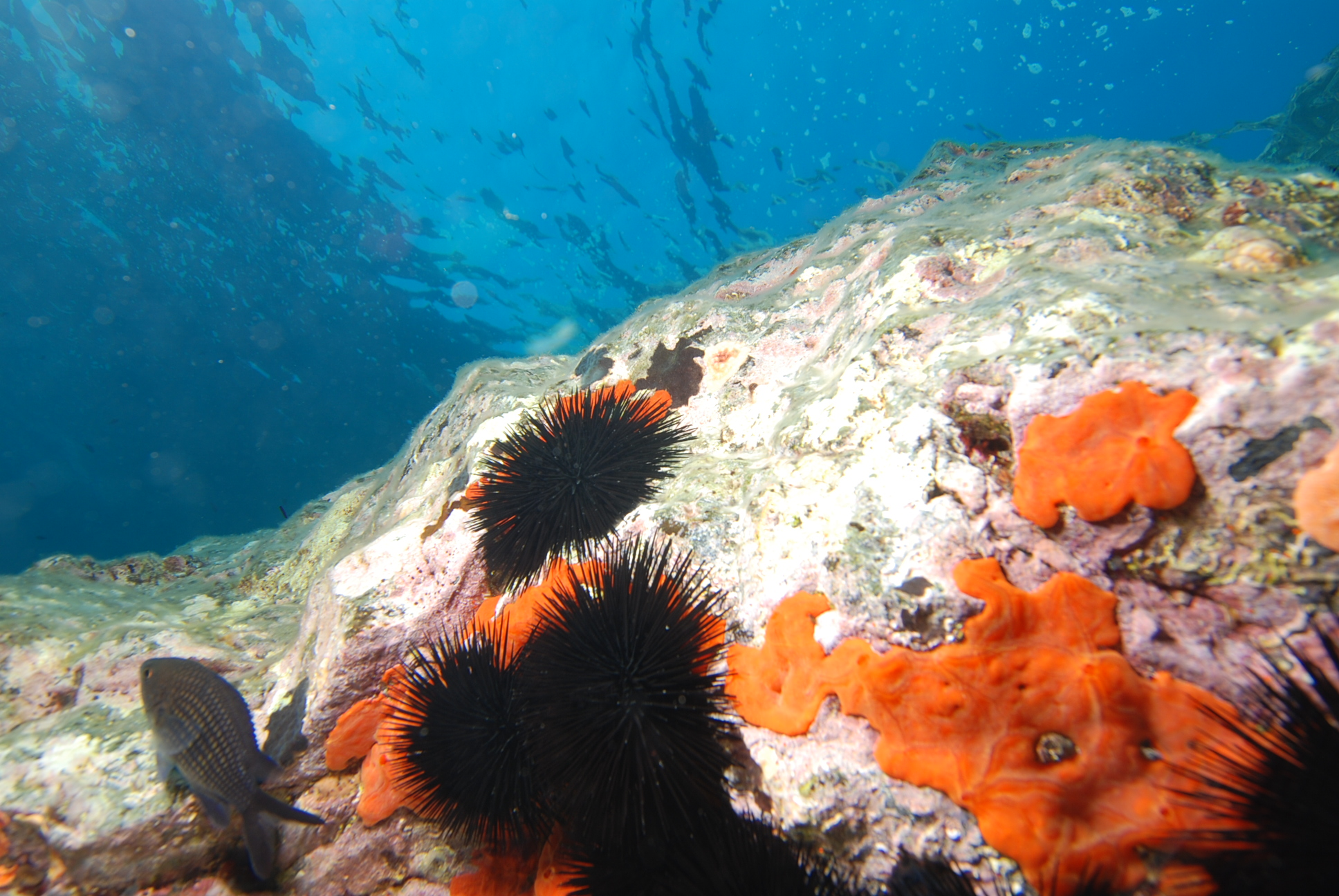
In situ

This species can be confused with the purple sea urchin Paracentrotus lividus, but the latter is never really black (though often very dark), has more dishevelled spines of many lengths, covers itself with debris, has spines around the mouth and no anal valve, and does not live exposed on the cliffs.

== Habitat and geographical range ==
This species can be found on the coast of the Mediterranean Sea and Macaronesian Islands (Azores, Madeira, Canary Islands), and less commonly, on the Atlantic coast of Western Africa and the Brazilian coast. It is found typically at shallow waters, at depths from 0 to 30 m, in rocky shores. It has a good resistance to hydrodynamism due to a good attachment strength to rocks.

== Biology ==
This species feeds mainly on crustose red algae and small filamentous algae. In a marine reserve in the Mediterranean, its population increased by a factor over 10 between 1983 and 1992, from eight to 100 individuals per meter^{2}. High seawater temperatures are thought to favour this species. When it was excluded from an area of the reserve, the density of filamentous algae increased.

== See also ==
- Arbacia spatuligera
