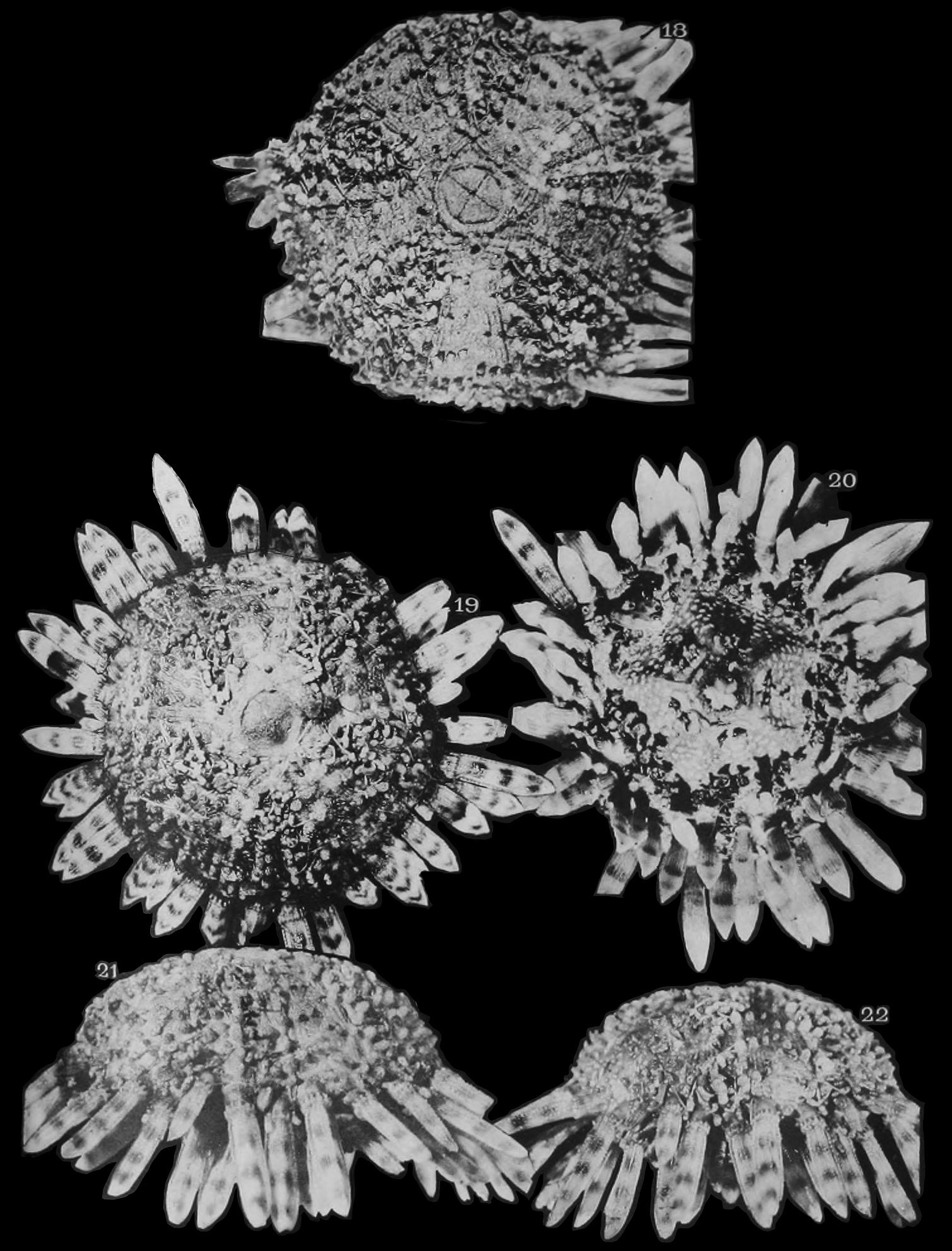

Scientific classification
- Domain: Eukaryota
- Kingdom: Animalia
- Phylum: Echinodermata
- Class: Echinoidea
- Order: Arbacioida
- Family: Arbaciidae
- Genus: Arbaciella
- Species: A. elegans

Binomial name
- Arbaciella elegans (Mortensen, 1910)

= Arbaciella elegans =

Species of sea urchin

Arbaciella elegans is a species of sea urchin of the family Arbaciidae. Their armour is covered with spines. It is placed in the genus Arbacia and lives in the sea. Arbaciella elegans was first scientifically described in 1910 by Ole Theodor Jensen Mortensen.

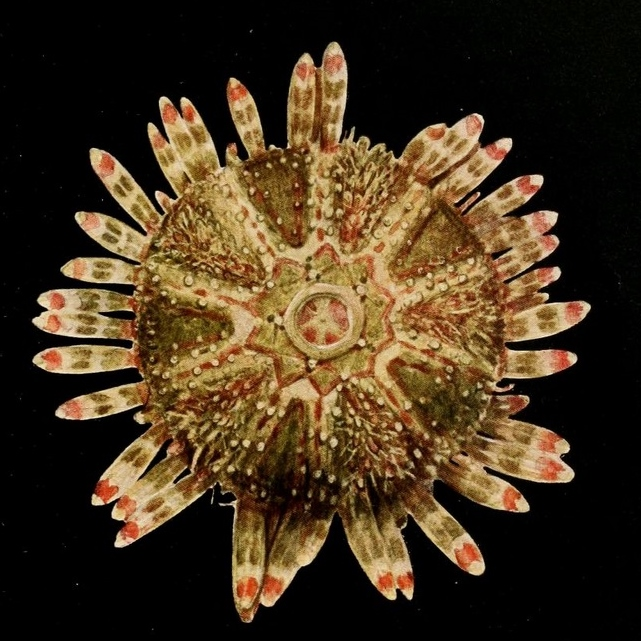
Holotype (Mortensen, 1910).
