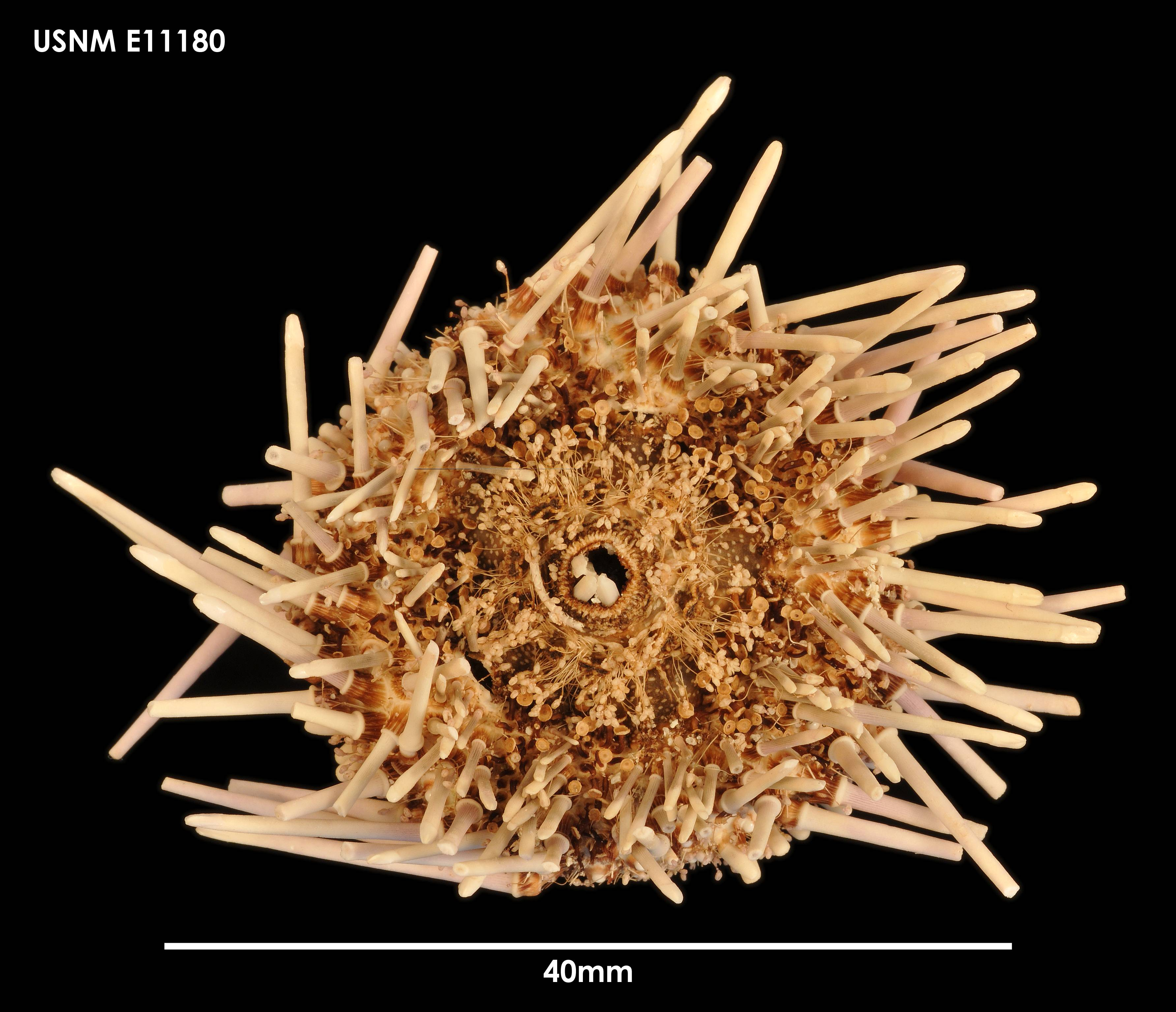

Scientific classification
- Kingdom: Animalia
- Phylum: Echinodermata
- Class: Echinoidea
- Order: Arbacioida
- Family: Arbaciidae
- Genus: Arbacia
- Species: A. dufresnii

Binomial name
- Arbacia dufresnii (Blainville, 1825)

Synonyms
- Arbacia crassispina Mortensen, 1910

= Arbacia dufresnii =

Species of sea urchin

Arbacia dufresnii is a species of sea urchin of the family Arbaciidae. Its armour is covered with spines. A. dufresnii was first scientifically described in 1825 by Blainville.
