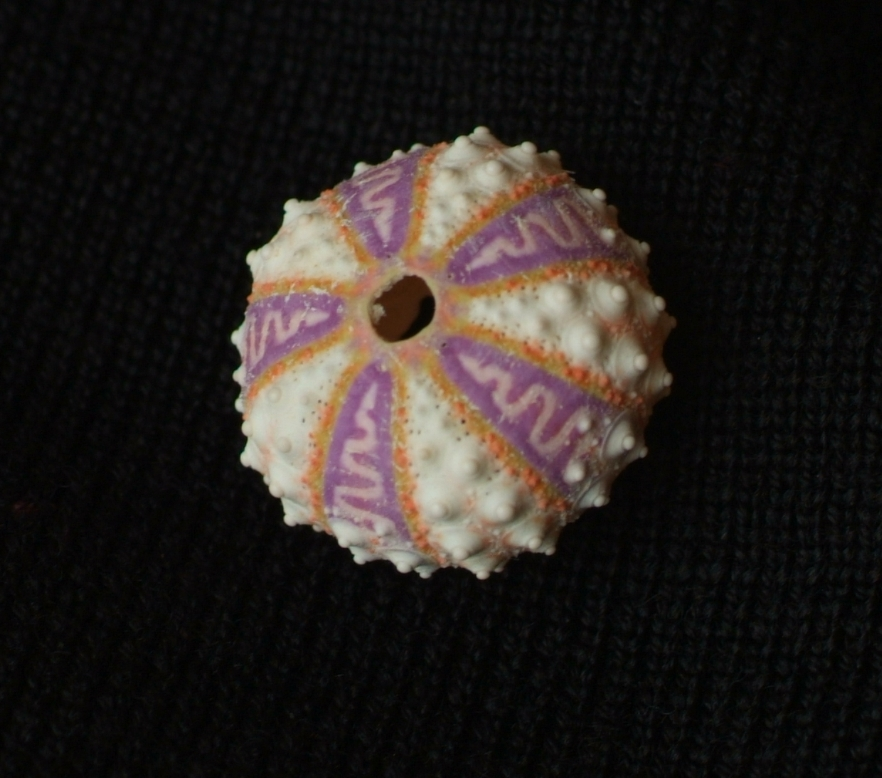

Scientific classification
- Kingdom: Animalia
- Phylum: Echinodermata
- Class: Echinoidea
- Order: Arbacioida
- Family: Arbaciidae
- Genus: Coelopleurus
- Species: C. exquisitus

Binomial name
- Coelopleurus exquisitus Coppard & Schultz, 2006

= Coelopleurus exquisitus =

Species of sea urchin

Coelopleurus exquisitus, the exquisite urchin, is a sea urchin species found off the coast of the island of New Caledonia in the Pacific Ocean. It is an epifaunal deepwater species living at depths between 240 and 520 m (790 and 1,710 ft) and was only identified and named in 2006.

== Colouration ==
The colouration and pattern of C. exquisitus is vibrant and distinctive. Examined individuals of the species show that the test is up to 35 mm (1.4 in) in diameter, with long, curved spines. These primary spikes are curved and banded with red and light green. It has large purple interambulacral regions with undulating lavender lines, while the remainder of the epithelium is coloured olive or light brown. This makes it highly sought after by collectors, which may threaten the species. However, too little is known about the species to confirm their number. The purpose of the pigmentation, which is present in both the skin and skeleton, is also unknown, given the low light conditions of its habitat. One presented theory is that the species migrated from shallower waters and has maintained its colouring.

== Discovery ==
The species was first identified after appearing on auction website eBay. Simon Coppard, marine biologist and member of the International Commission on Zoological Nomenclature, was directed to a listing on the site in 2004. Coppard was frequently asked to identify species, but did not recognise this particular specimen. Further investigation with the help of Heinke Schultz led him to realise it was a previously unidentified species.

The species was given a name fitting its unique and beautiful colouring, with details about C. exquisitus first published in taxonomy journal Zootaxa on 7 August 2006. Immediately after this public introduction, the value of specimens for sale on eBay rocketed from $8 to $138.

Coppard expressed concern that sea urchins like C. exquisitus could become endangered by sellers who abuse the insufficient regulatory protocols currently in place: "The collection and sale of these urchins should be regulated and monitored; otherwise, we may decimate the populations before we know much more about it."

A similar event occurred in 2008 when a fossilised aphid encased in amber was purchased from eBay. Again, the species was found to never have been described; it was given the name Mindarus harringtoni after the buyer's name.
