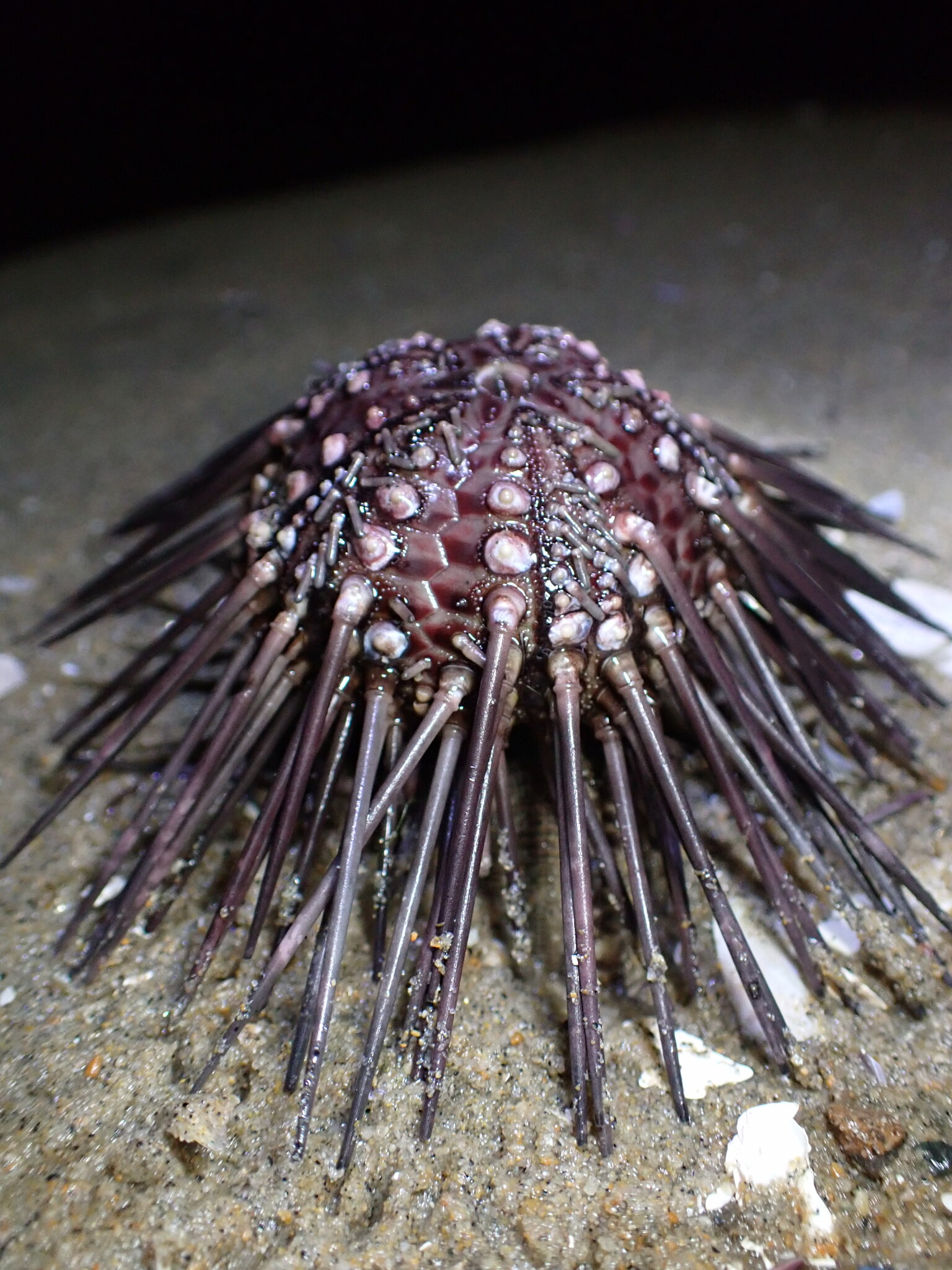
- Live specimen photographed 2023 near Huntington Beach, California
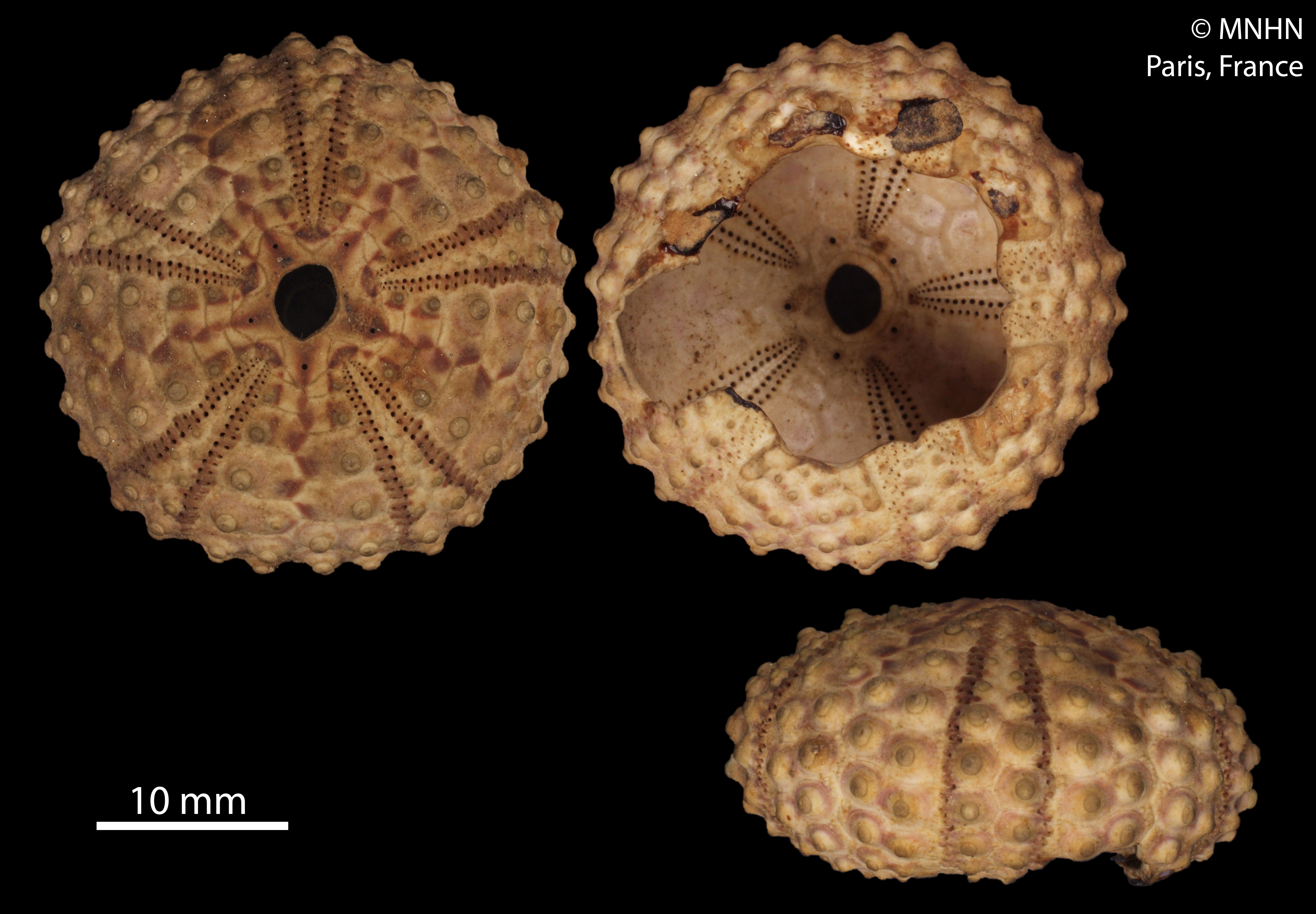

Scientific classification
- Domain: Eukaryota
- Kingdom: Animalia
- Phylum: Echinodermata
- Class: Echinoidea
- Order: Arbacioida
- Family: Arbaciidae
- Genus: Arbacia
- Species: A. stellata

Binomial name
- Arbacia stellata (Blainville, 1825)

= Arbacia stellata =

Black starry sea urchin

Arbacia stellata, the black starry sea urchin, is a species of sea urchin of the family Arbaciidae. Their armour is covered with spines. It is placed in the genus Arbacia and lives in the sea. Arbacia stellata was first scientifically described in 1825 by Blainville.
