= Purple sea urchin =

Purple sea urchin can refer to one of several species of sea urchin:

- Arbacia punctulata, a species of sea urchin from the family Arbaciidae commonly known as the Atlantic purple sea urchin
- Paracentrotus lividus, a species of sea urchin in the family Parechinidae commonly known as the purple sea urchin
- Strongylocentrotus purpuratus, a species of sea urchin in the family Strongylocentrotidae commonly known as the purple sea urchin
