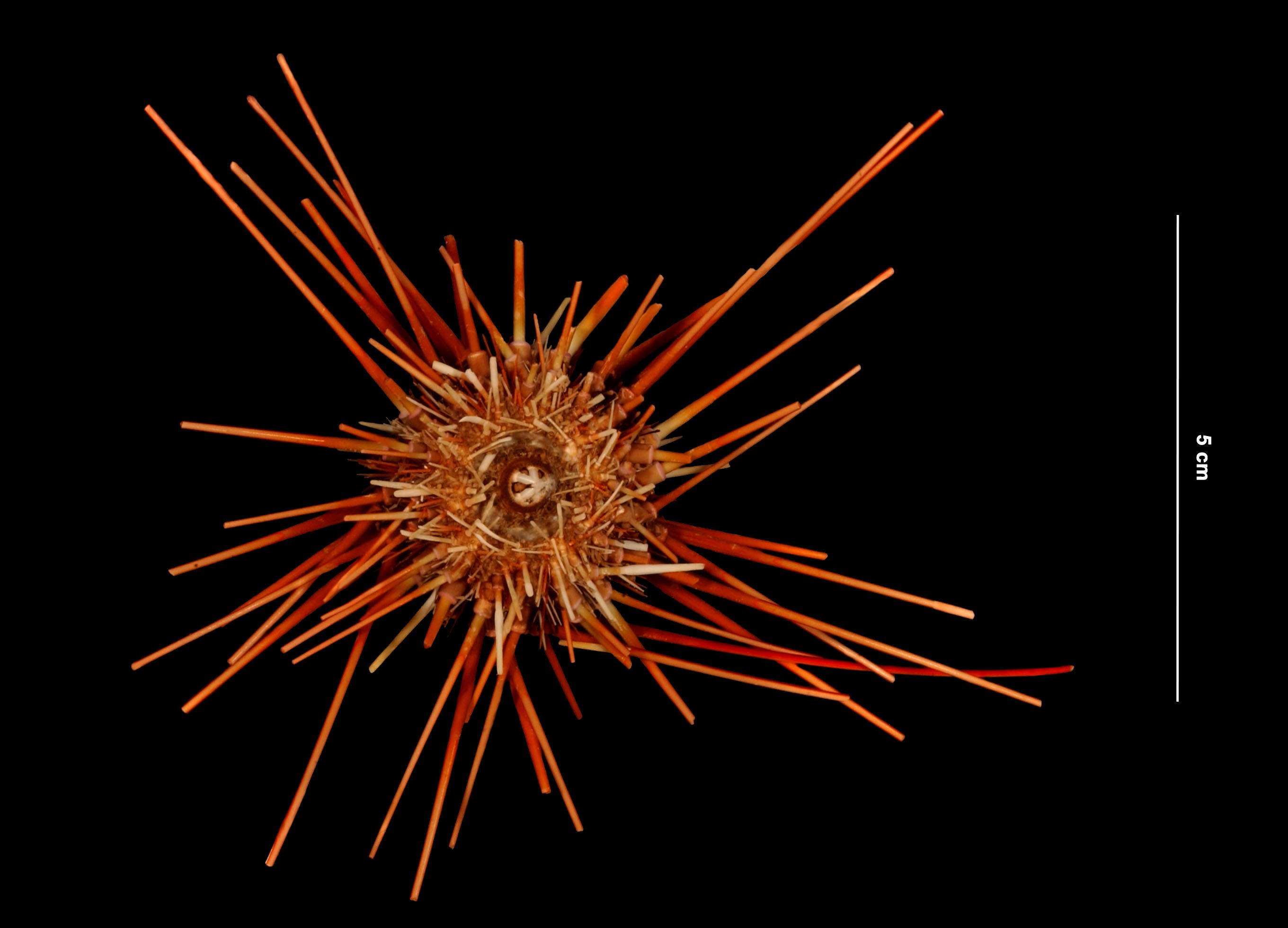
- Coelopleurus floridanus

Scientific classification
- Kingdom: Animalia
- Phylum: Echinodermata
- Class: Echinoidea
- Order: Arbacioida
- Family: Arbaciidae
- Genus: Coelopleurus
- Species: C. floridanus

Binomial name
- Coelopleurus floridanus A. Agassiz, 1872

= Coelopleurus floridanus =

Sea urchin species

Coelopleurus floridanus is a sea urchin species in the family Arbaciidae restricted to deep waters in the western Atlantic, from the West Indies up to Cape May, New Jersey. The species may feed on bryozoans, worm tubes, and clavulariid corals. The species belongs in the subgenus Keraiophorus, which includes all extant Coelopleurus species and Oligo-Miocene species from Pakistan.
