= Hattopsis =

Hattopsis Temporal range: Maastrichtian

Scientific classification
- Kingdom: Animalia
- Phylum: Echinodermata
- Class: Echinoidea
- Order: Arbacioida
- Family: Arbaciidae
- Genus: †Hattopsis; Ali, 1992
- Species: †H. sphericus

Binomial name
- †Hattopsis sphericus Ali, 1992

Extinct genus of sea urchin

Hattopsis is a genus of echinoid in the family Arbaciidae. It was described in 1992 from specimens in the UAE. There were 2 species described, though one was moved to another genus: Hattopsis paucituberculatus (now in genus Noetlingaster as Noetlingaster monotuberculatus) and Hattopsis sphericus, both are known from the late maastrichtian. Another species, Hattopsis muradi, was described in 2024.
