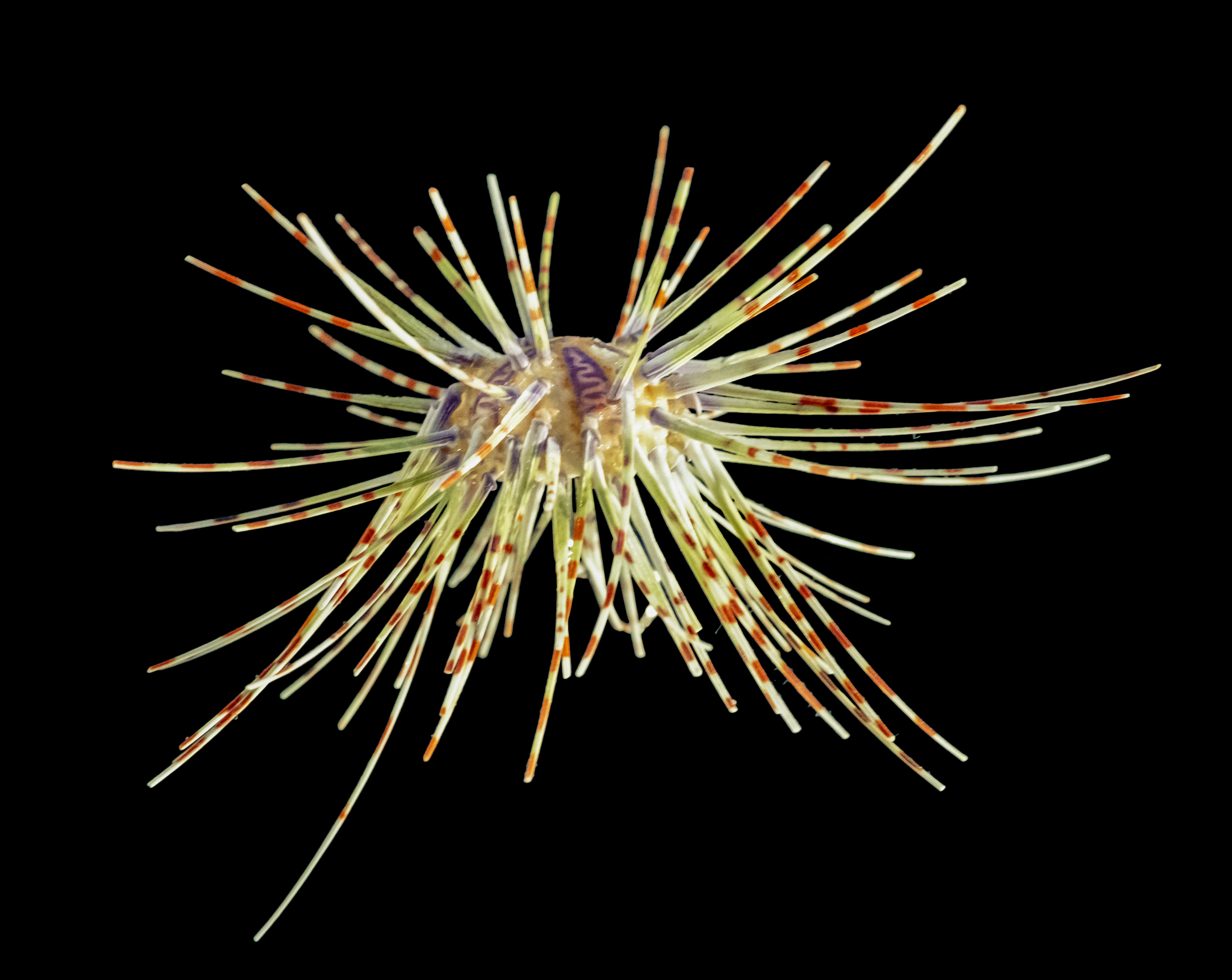
- Coelopleurus maculatus

Scientific classification
- Kingdom: Animalia
- Phylum: Echinodermata
- Class: Echinoidea
- Order: Arbacioida
- Family: Arbaciidae
- Genus: Coelopleurus; Agassiz

= Coelopleurus =

Coelopleurus Temporal range: Eocene–Present

Genus of sea urchins

Coelopleurus is an extant genus of echinoids with fossil records dating back to the Eocene, with remains found in Europe and North America.

== Characteristics ==
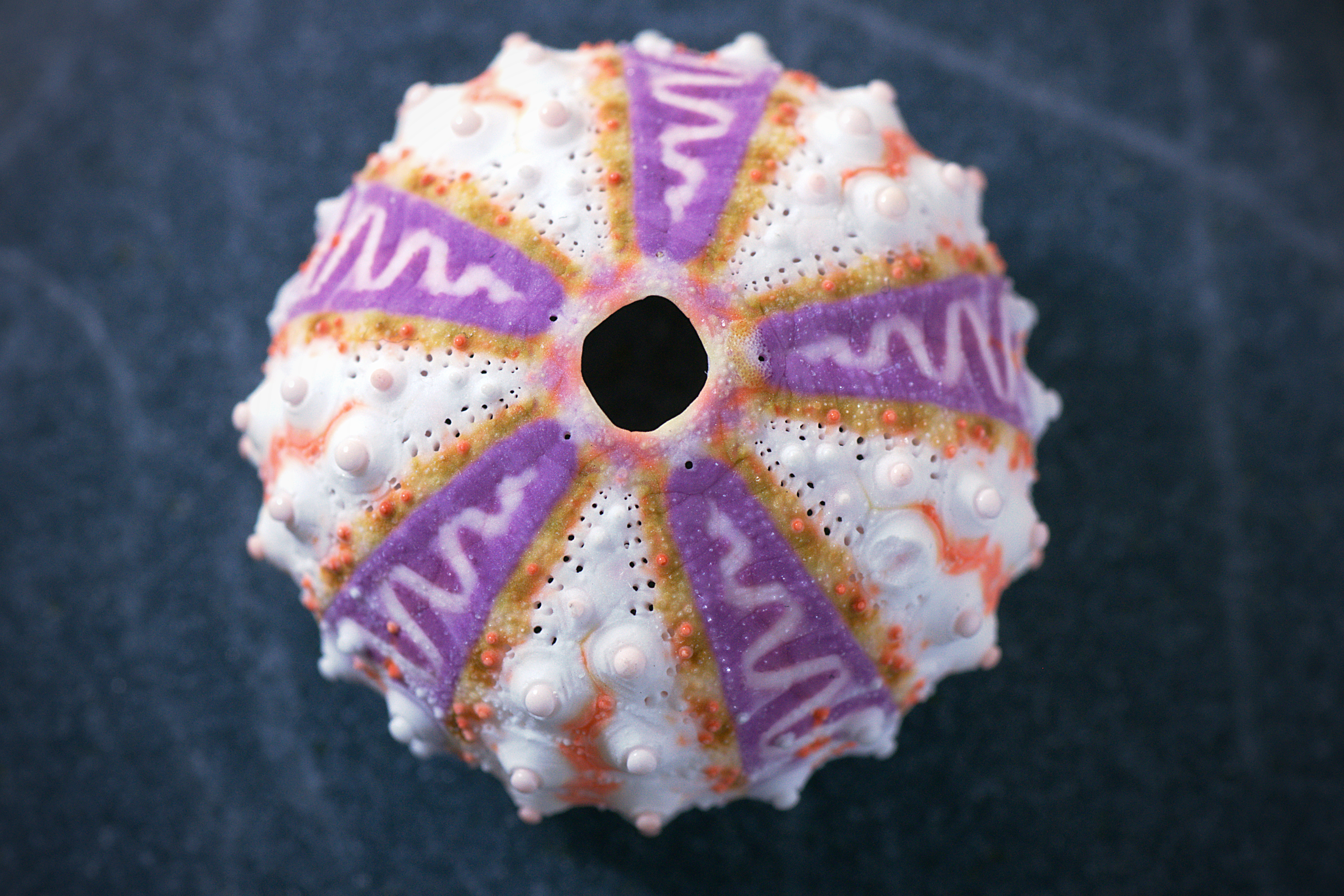
Test of a Coelopleurus exquisitus

These abyssal sea urchins are characterized by their surprisingly bright color pattern, usually red and white. Even more surprisingly, their tests (skeletons) are brightly colored, too, even after drying, or sometimes fossilization.

== Species ==
According to World Register of Marine Species:

- Coelopleurus australis H.L. Clark, 1916
- Coelopleurus carolinensis Cooke, 1941a †
- Coelopleurus castroi Maury, 1930 †
- Coelopleurus exquisitus Coppard & Schultz, 2006
- Coelopleurus floridanus Agassiz, 1872
- Coelopleurus granulatus Mortensen, 1934
- Coelopleurus interruptus Döderlein, 1910
- Coelopleurus longicollis Agassiz & H.L. Clark, 1908
- Coelopleurus maculatus Agassiz & H.L. Clark, 1907
- Coelopleurus maillardi (Michelin, 1862)
- Coelopleurus melitensis Zammit-Maempel, 1969 †
- Coelopleurus singularis Nisiyama, 1966
- Coelopleurus undulatus Mortensen, 1934a
- Coelopleurus vittatus Koehler, 1927

Fossil species:

- †Coelopleurus elegans (Bell), from the Pleistocene of the Jizo-do formation of Japan
