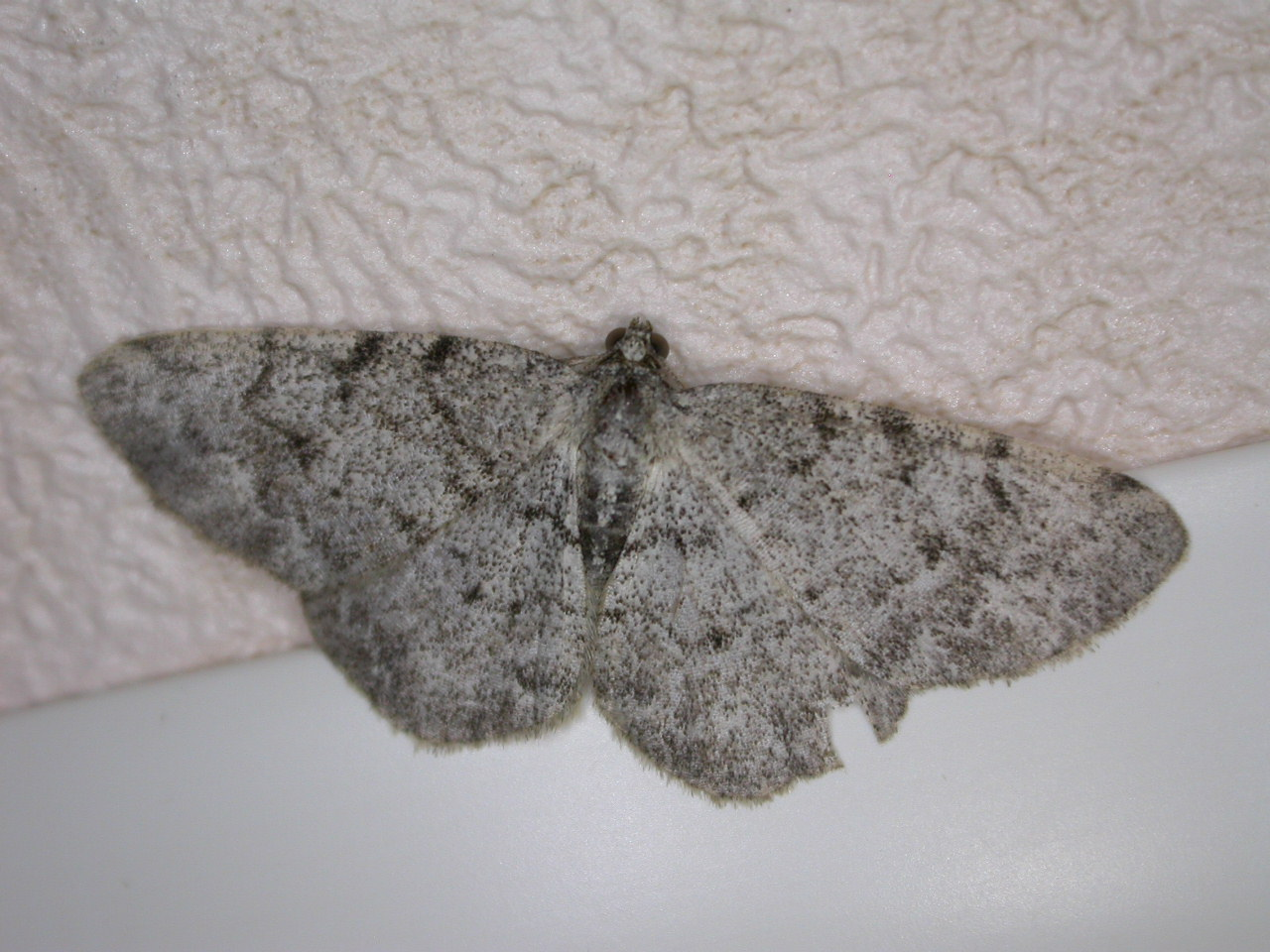
- Aethalura punctulata

Scientific classification
- Kingdom: Animalia
- Phylum: Arthropoda
- Clade: Pancrustacea
- Class: Insecta
- Order: Lepidoptera
- Family: Geometridae
- Tribe: Boarmiini
- Genus: Aethalura; McDunnough, 1920

= Aethalura =

Genus of geometer moths

Aethalura is a genus of moths in the family Geometridae.

== Species ==
- Aethalura ignobilis (Butler, 1878)
- Aethalura intertexta – four-barred grey (Walker, 1860)
- Aethalura nanaria (Staudinger, 1897)
- Aethalura punctulata – grey birch (Denis & Schiffermüller, 1775)
