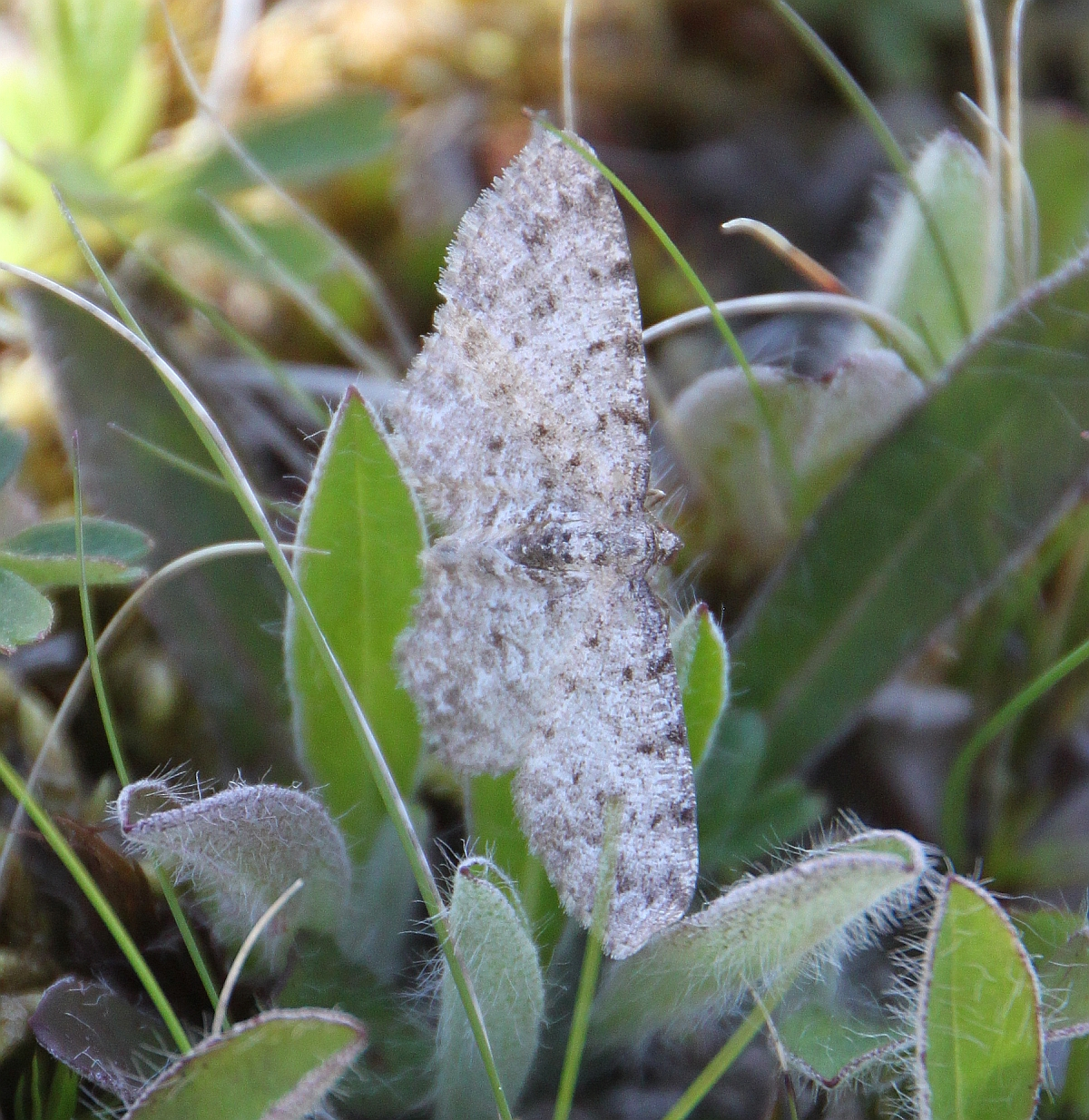

Scientific classification
- Kingdom: Animalia
- Phylum: Arthropoda
- Class: Insecta
- Order: Lepidoptera
- Family: Geometridae
- Genus: Aethalura
- Species: A. intertexta

Binomial name
- Aethalura intertexta (Walker, 1860)

= Aethalura intertexta =

Species of moth

Aethalura intertexta, the four-barred gray or smoky carpet moth, is a species of moth in the family Geometridae. The species was first described by Francis Walker in 1860. It is found in North America.

== Subspecies ==
Two subspecies belong to Aethalura intertexta:

- Aethalura intertexta fumata (Barnes & McDunnough, 1917)^{i g}
- Aethalura intertexta intertexta (Walker, 1860)^{i g}

Data sources: i = ITIS, c = Catalogue of Life, g = GBIF, b = BugGuide
