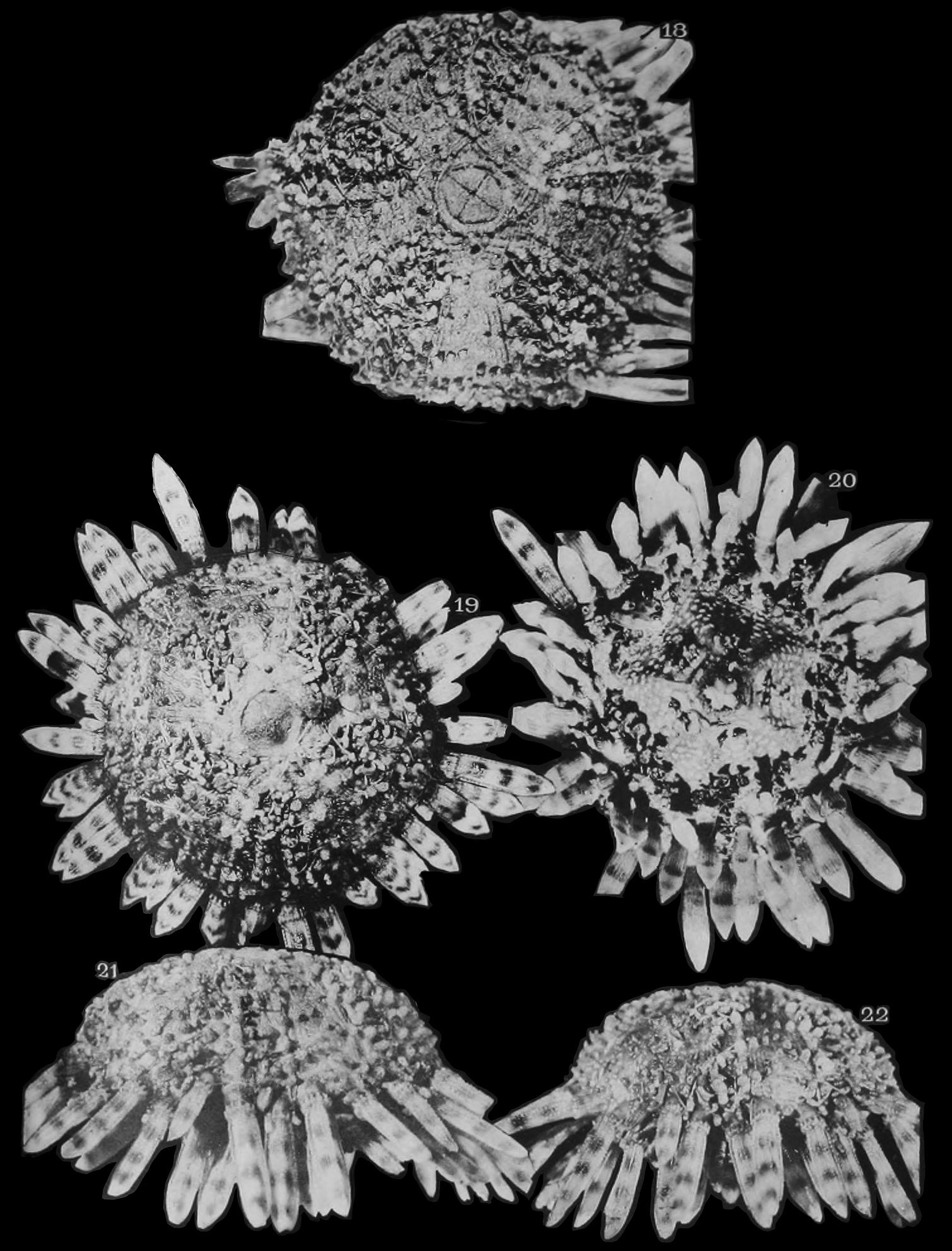
- Arbaciella.jpg

Scientific classification
- Kingdom: Animalia
- Phylum: Echinodermata
- Class: Echinoidea
- Order: Arbacioida
- Family: Arbaciidae
- Genus: Arbaciella; Mortensen, 1910

= Arbaciella =

Genus of sea urchins

Arbaciella is a genus of echinoderms belonging to the family Arbaciidae.

Species:

- Arbaciella elegans Mortenen, 1910
- Arbaciella regularis (Arnaud, in Cotteau, 1887)
