= Mindarus harringtoni =

Scientific classification
- Kingdom: Animalia
- Phylum: Arthropoda
- Class: Insecta
- Order: Hemiptera
- Suborder: Sternorrhyncha
- Family: Aphididae
- Genus: Mindarus
- Species: †M. harringtoni

Binomial name
- †Mindarus harringtoni Heie, 2008

Extinct species of true bug

Mindarus harringtoni is an extinct species of aphid. The insect was discovered when Richard Harrington, a scientist and vice-president of the Royal Entomological Society of London, won an auction on eBay for a fossilized specimen, later to discover it was an unknown species. The fossil was bought from an individual from Lithuania. The insect itself is 3–4 millimetres (0.12–0.16 in) long and was encased in a piece of amber 40 to 50 million years ago.

The fossil was sent to Ole Heie, an aphid expert in Denmark, who confirmed the insect a new species, now extinct. The insect was named Mindarus harringtoni after Harrington, who first considered naming it Mindarus ebayi after the site he won it on.

The fossil is now housed in the Natural History Museum.

Mindarus harringtoni is thought to have fed on a tree called Pinus succinifera, which itself is long extinct.

== See also ==
- Coelopleurus exquisitus, another species discovered on eBay
