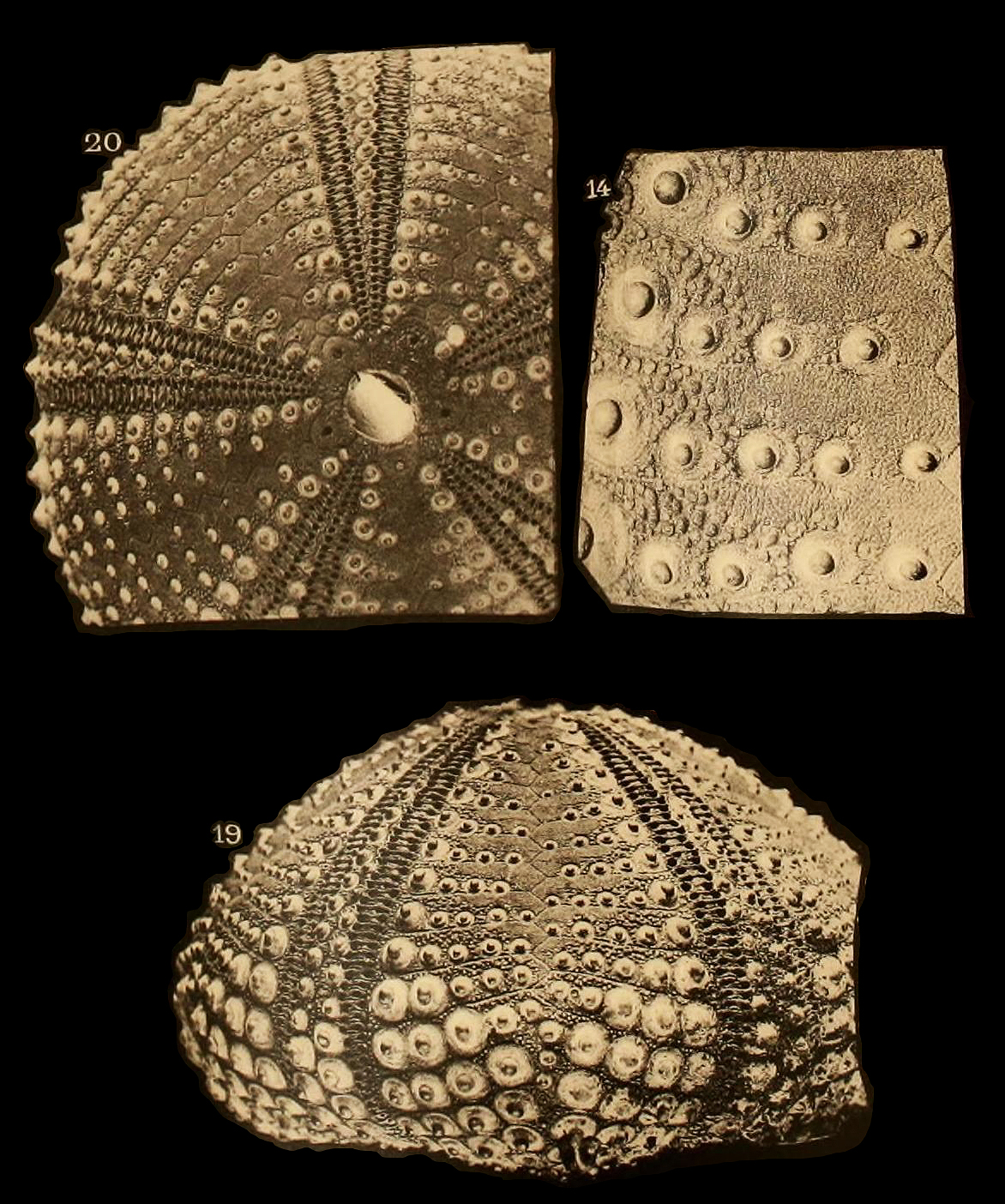

Scientific classification
- Domain: Eukaryota
- Kingdom: Animalia
- Phylum: Echinodermata
- Class: Echinoidea
- Order: Arbacioida
- Family: Arbaciidae
- Genus: Arbacia
- Species: A. spatuligera

Binomial name
- Arbacia spatuligera (Valenciennes, 1846)

= Arbacia spatuligera =

Species of sea urchin

Arbacia spatuligera is a species of sea urchin of the family Arbaciidae. Its armour is covered with spines. A. lixula was first scientifically described in 1846 by Valenciennes.
