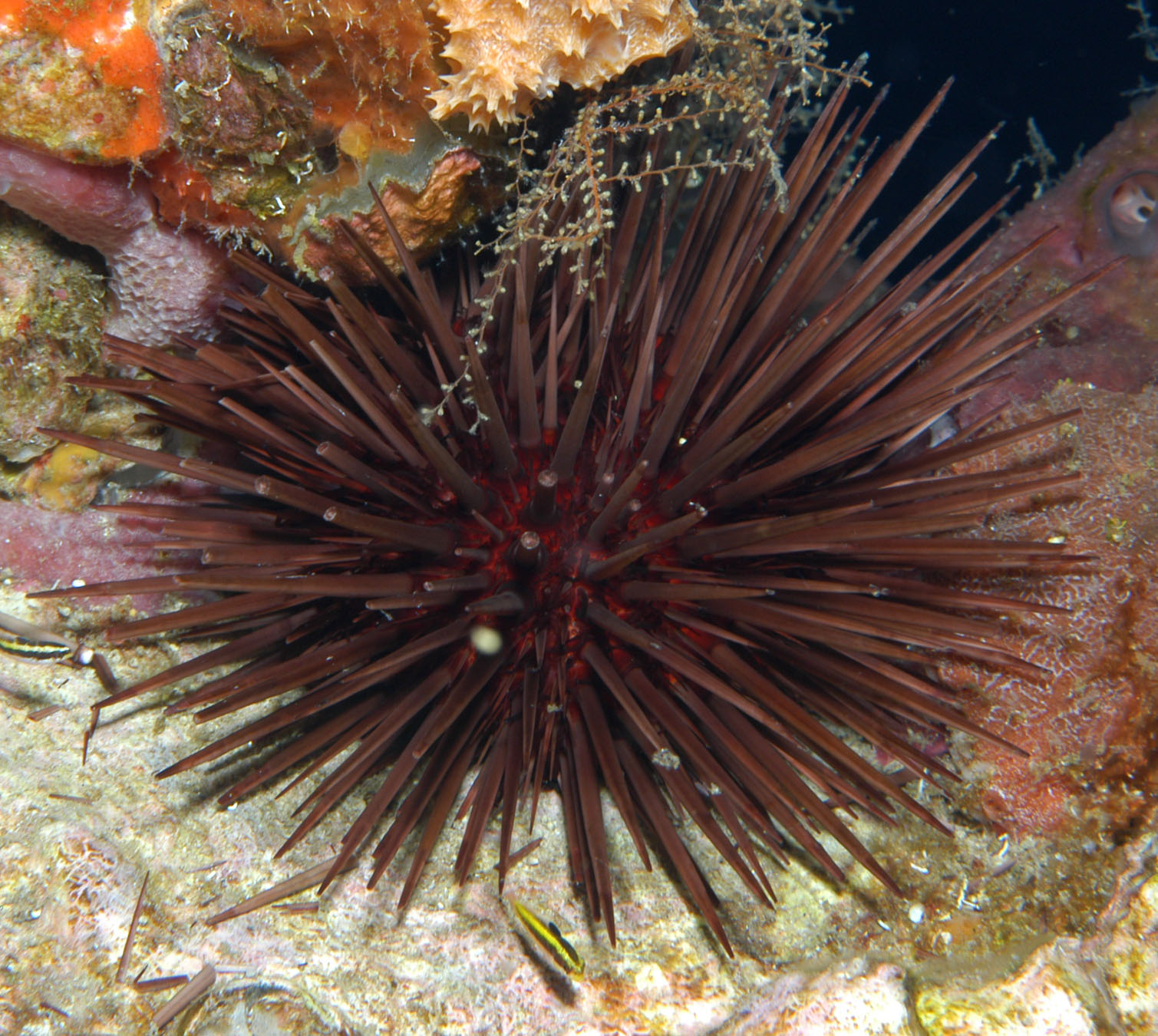

Scientific classification
- Kingdom: Animalia
- Phylum: Echinodermata
- Class: Echinoidea
- Order: Arbacioida
- Family: Arbaciidae
- Genus: Arbacia
- Species: A. punctulata

Binomial name
- Arbacia punctulata (Lamarck, 1816)

Synonyms
- Anapesus carolinus Holmes, 1860; Echinocidaris davisii A. Agassiz, 1863; Echinocidaris punctulata (Lamarck, 1816); Echinus punctulatus Lamarck, 1816

= Arbacia punctulata =

Species of sea urchin

The Atlantic purple sea urchin (Arbacia punctulata) is a species of sea urchins from the family Arbaciidae, native to the Atlantic Ocean.

== Description ==
The Atlantic purple sea urchin is a spherical, dark purple-spined sea urchin, with a nearly flat oral face. It can reach up to 8 cm in diameter, and is native to the North Atlantic Ocean.

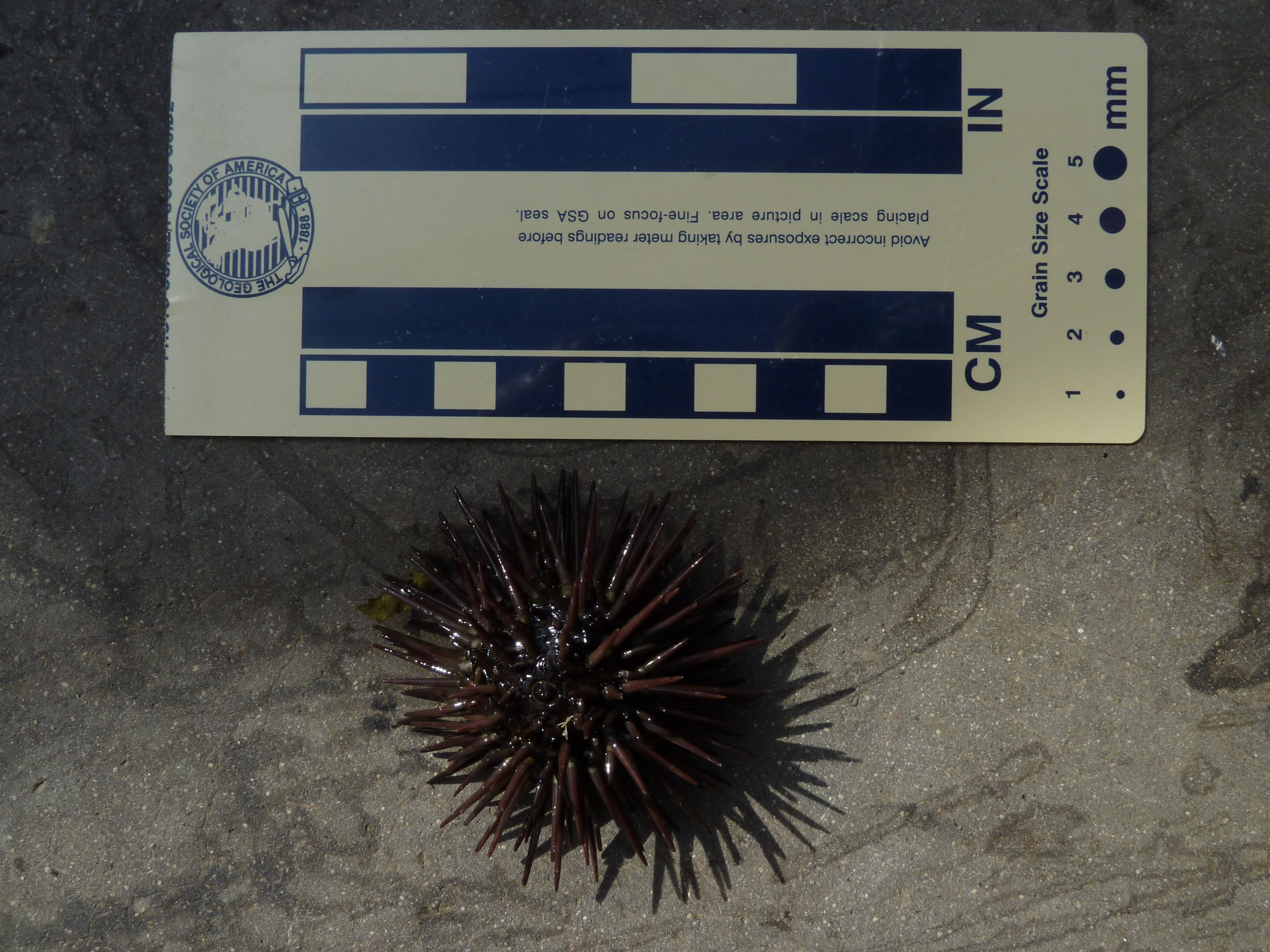
Face – aboral

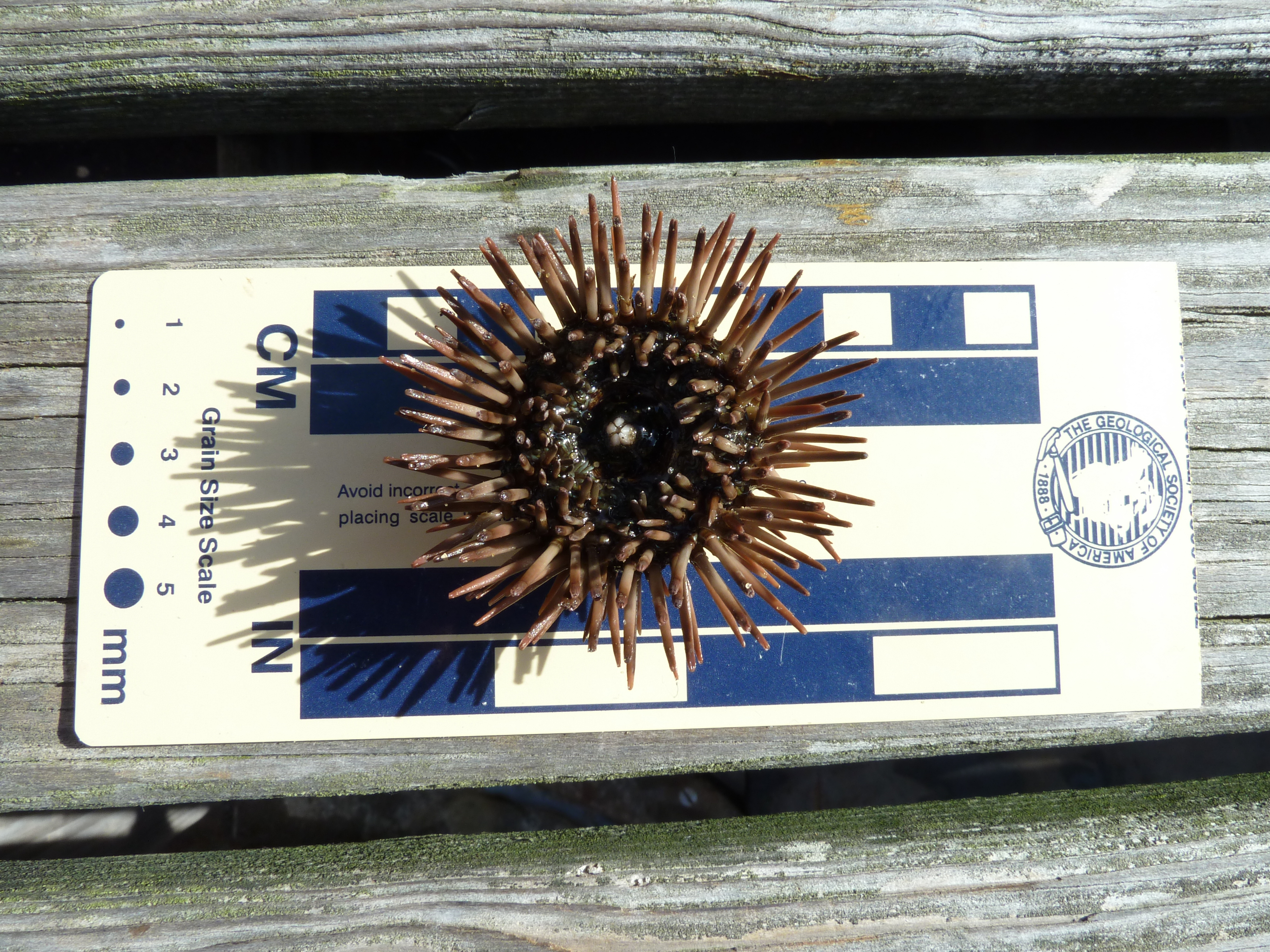
Face – oral

== Habitat and range ==
Its natural habitat is in the western Atlantic Ocean. A. punctulata can be found in shallow water from Massachusetts to Cuba and the Yucatan Peninsula, from Texas to Florida in the Gulf of Mexico, the coast from Panama to French Guiana, and in the Lesser Antilles, usually on rocky, sandy, or shelly bottoms.

== Ecology and behaviour ==
A. punctulata is omnivorous, consuming a wide variety of prey although Karlson classified it as a generalized carnivore. Galactolipids and an uncharacterized carbohydrate, but not phlorotannins, have been reported to act as herbivore deterrents in Fucus vesiculosus against A. punctulata.

== Uses in science ==
For more than a century, developmental biologists have valued the sea urchin as an experimental model organism. Sea urchin eggs are transparent and can be manipulated easily in the research laboratory. Their eggs can be easily fertilized and then develop rapidly and synchronously.

For decades, the sea urchin embryo has been used to establish the chromosome theory of heredity, the description of centrosomes, parthenogenesis, and fertilization. Research work during the last 30 years established such important phenomena as stable mRNA and translational control, isolation and characterization of the mitotic apparatus, and the realization that the major structural proteins of the mitotic apparatus are microtubules. Sea urchin studies provided the first evidence of actin in nonmuscle cells.

Arbacia punctulata is also a model organism of marine sediment toxicity and for sperm study.
