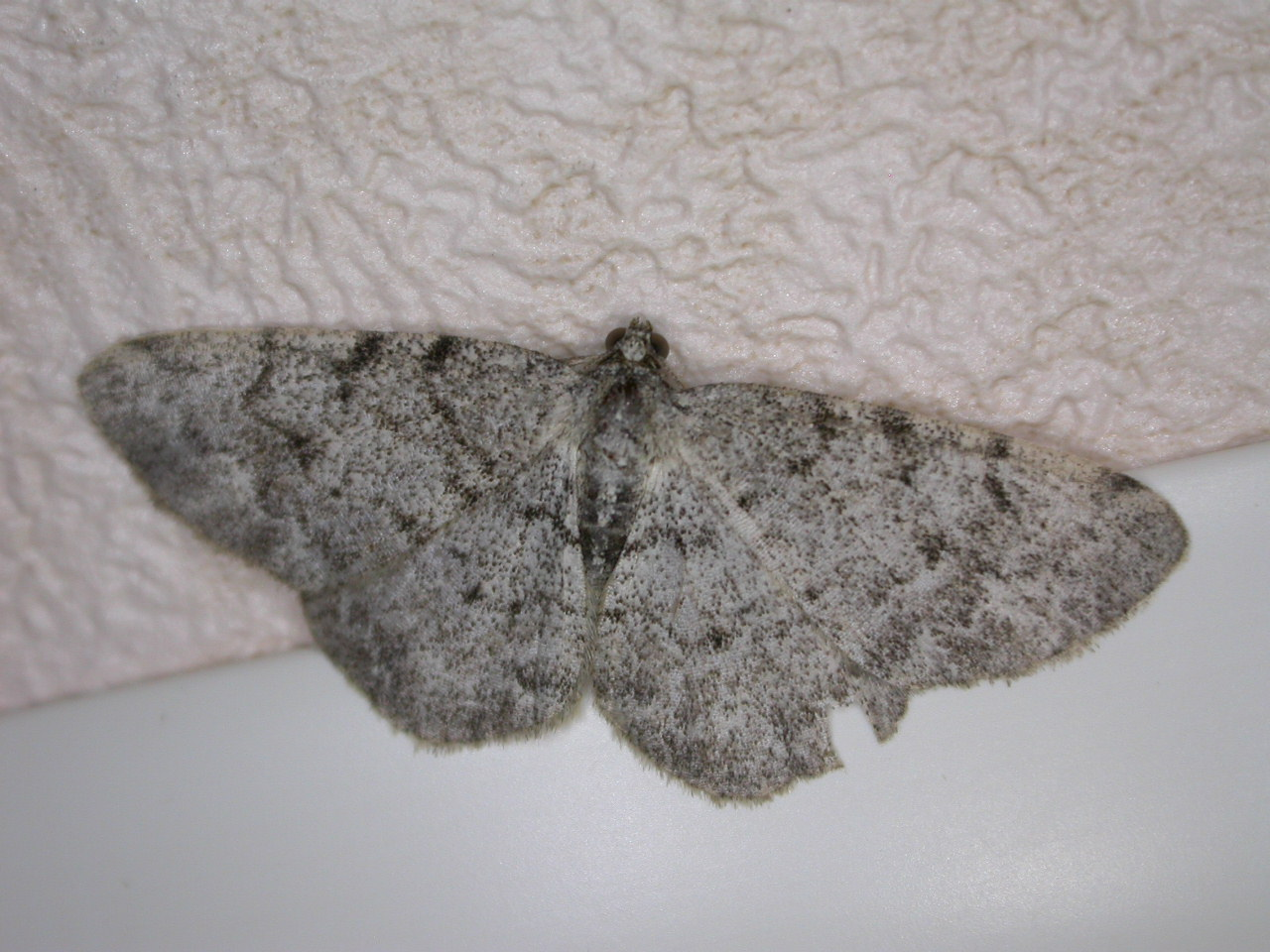

Scientific classification
- Kingdom: Animalia
- Phylum: Arthropoda
- Class: Insecta
- Order: Lepidoptera
- Family: Geometridae
- Subfamily: Ennominae
- Tribe: Boarmiini
- Genus: Aethalura
- Species: A. punctulata

Binomial name
- Aethalura punctulata (Denis & Schiffermüller, 1775)

= Aethalura punctulata =

Species of moth

Aethalura punctulata, the grey birch, is a moth of the family Geometridae. The species is found in Europe and then east, as far as western Siberia and the Caucasus.This species prefers sparse alder-ash-floodplain forests on moist to wet locations. Although it is only locally distributed in Central Europe, it is usually common in these biotopes. It occurs from the plains to the middle mountain regions. In the Alps it rises up to 1600 m.

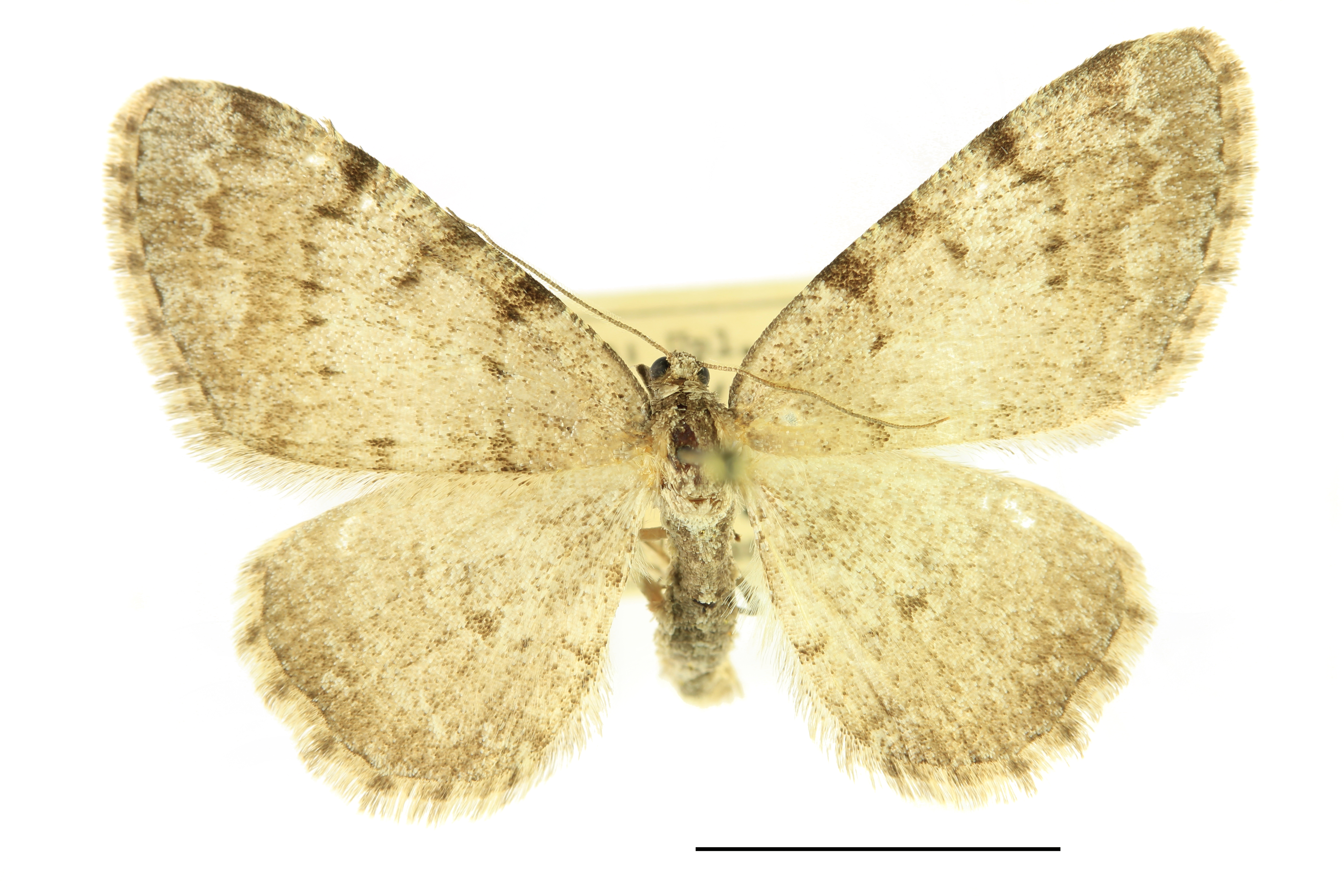

The wingspan is 30–35 mm. The upperside forewings wings are ash to light brownish gray. Darkened and light forms occur. The banding is also variable. Three black crossbars are strong and usually reach the front edge. According to the variability of colour and bars several formæ have been described.

- f. trilineata Bruckova, 1945: with three clear cross-lines
- f. marginata Lempke, 1953: darkened clouds on the front and rear wings
- f. albescens Prout, 1915: ground colour of the wings almost uniformly whitish
- f. intermedia Lempke, 1953: wings dark grey, clear markings
- f. cinerea Leraut, 2002: wing ash grey, clear markings
- f. obscuraria Paux, 1901: wings uniform black-grey
- f. costijuncta Lempke, 1970: a wide black band is developed at the front edge of the front wing
- f. anastomosaria Lempke, 1970: first and second cross-country lines on the front wing are complete

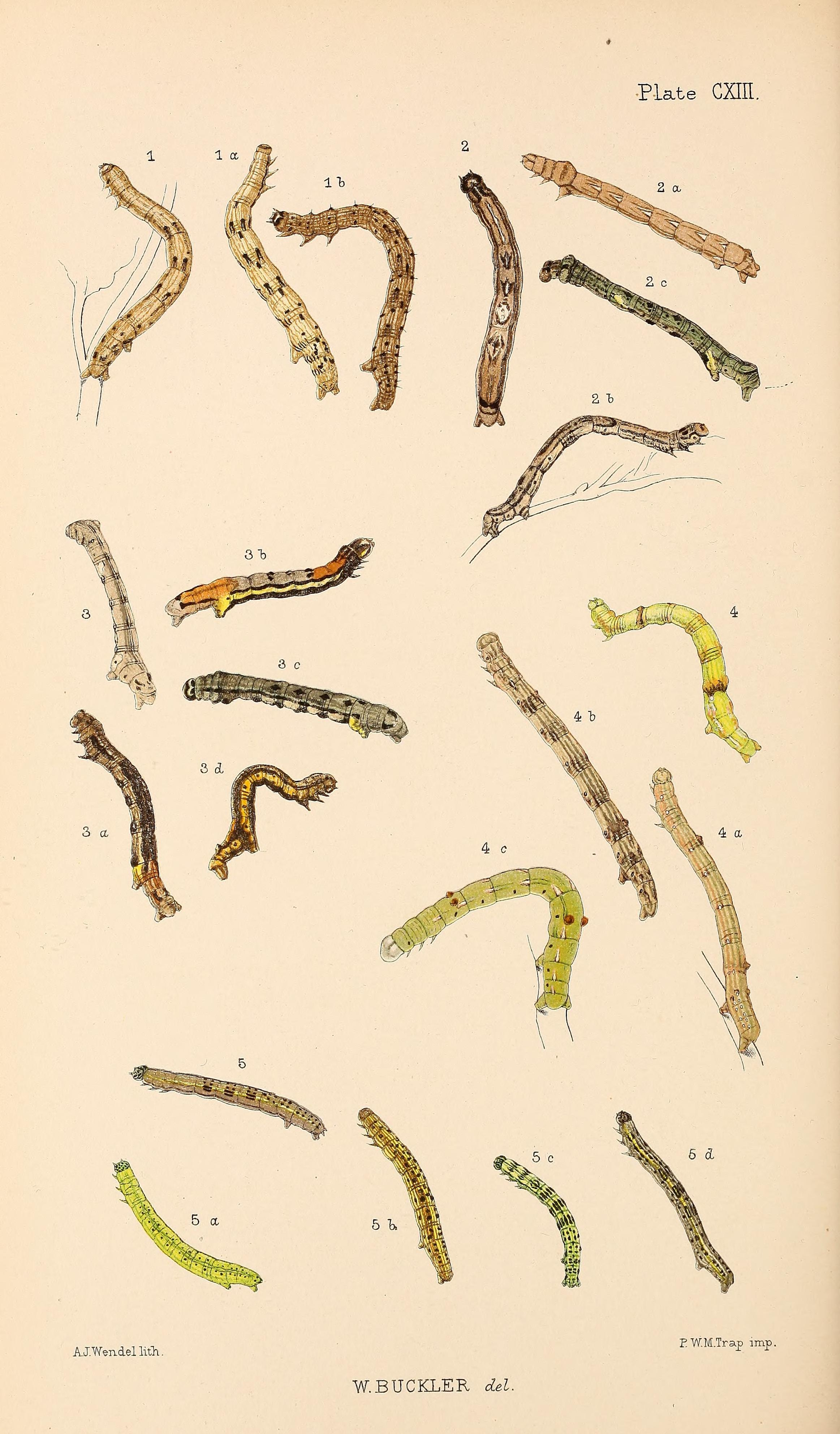
Fig 5,5a,5b,5c, 5d Larvae in various stages

The larva is brownish, greenish, greenish-grey or violet-brown. The longitudinal lines and the incisions of the segments are usually yellowish or whitish, often with enlarged stains. The longitudinal lines are often interrupted or dissolved to elongated points.

The pupa is reddish-brown to dark reddish-brown. The cremaster is blunt-conical.

The moths flies from March to July depending on the location.

The caterpillars feed on birch.
