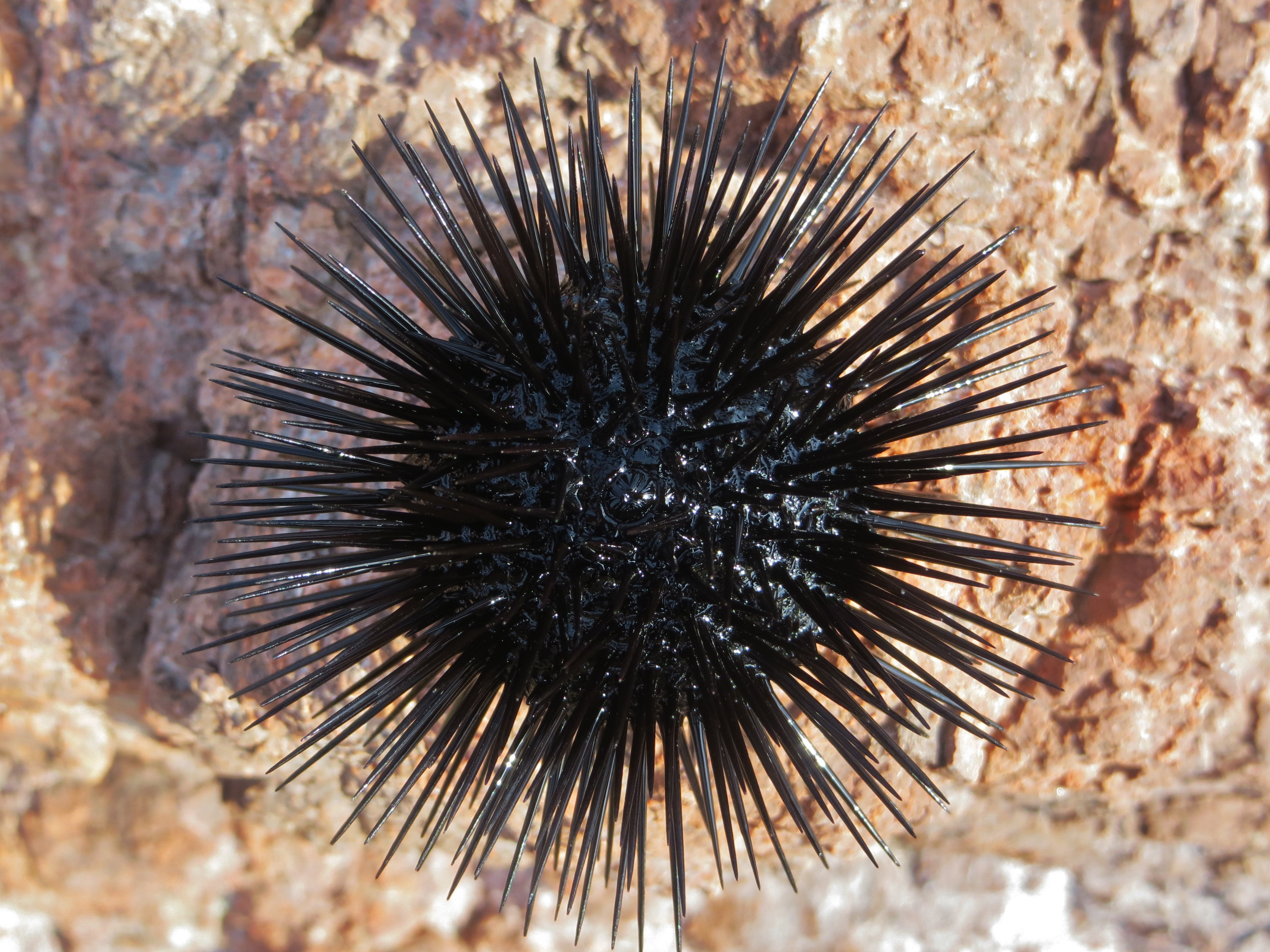
- Arbacia lixula

Scientific classification
- Kingdom: Animalia
- Phylum: Echinodermata
- Class: Echinoidea
- Order: Arbacioida
- Family: Arbaciidae
- Genus: Arbacia; Gray, 1835

= Arbacia =

Arbacia Temporal range: Miocene–Recent

Genus of sea urchins

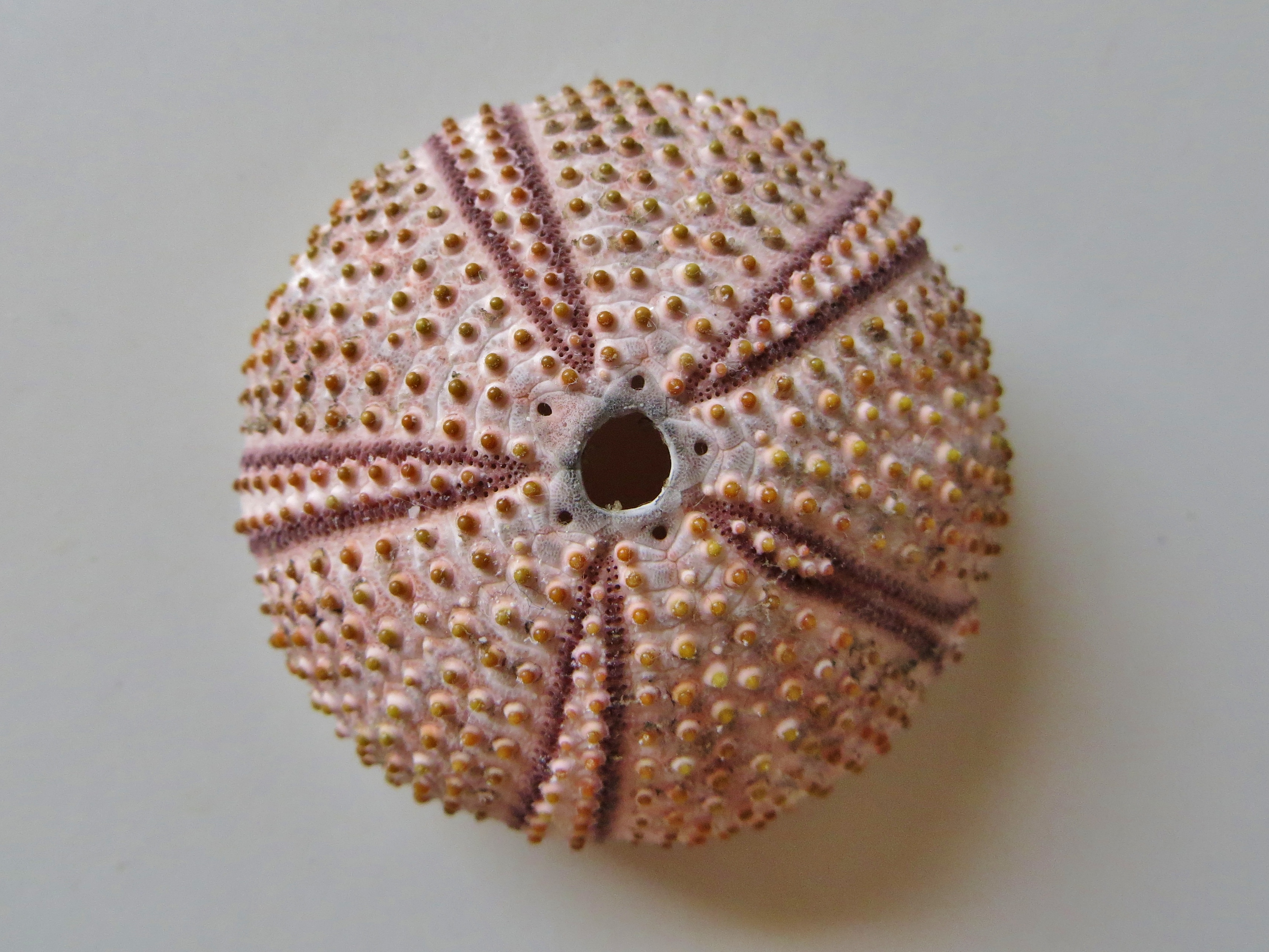
Test of an Arbacia lixula.

Arbacia is a genus of sea urchins, widespread in the Atlantic and eastern Pacific oceans.

== Species ==
According to the World Register of Marine Species this genus includes the following species:

- Arbacia abiquaensis Linder, Durham & Orr, 1988 †
- Arbacia crenulata Kier, 1963 † (Miocene, east coast of USA)
- Arbacia dufresnii (Blainville, 1825) (Patagonia and Antarctica)
- Arbacia lixula (Linnaeus, 1758) (Mediterranean)
- Arbacia nigra Molina, 1782
- Arbacia punctulata (Lamarck, 1816) (Caribbean)
- Arbacia rivuli Cooke, 1941a † (Pliocene, east coast of USA)
- Arbacia spatuligera (Valenciennes, 1846) (Peru and Chile)
- Arbacia stellata (Blainville, 1825; ?Gmelin, 1788) (East Pacific)
- Arbacia waccamaw Cooke, 1941a † (Pliocene, east coast of USA)
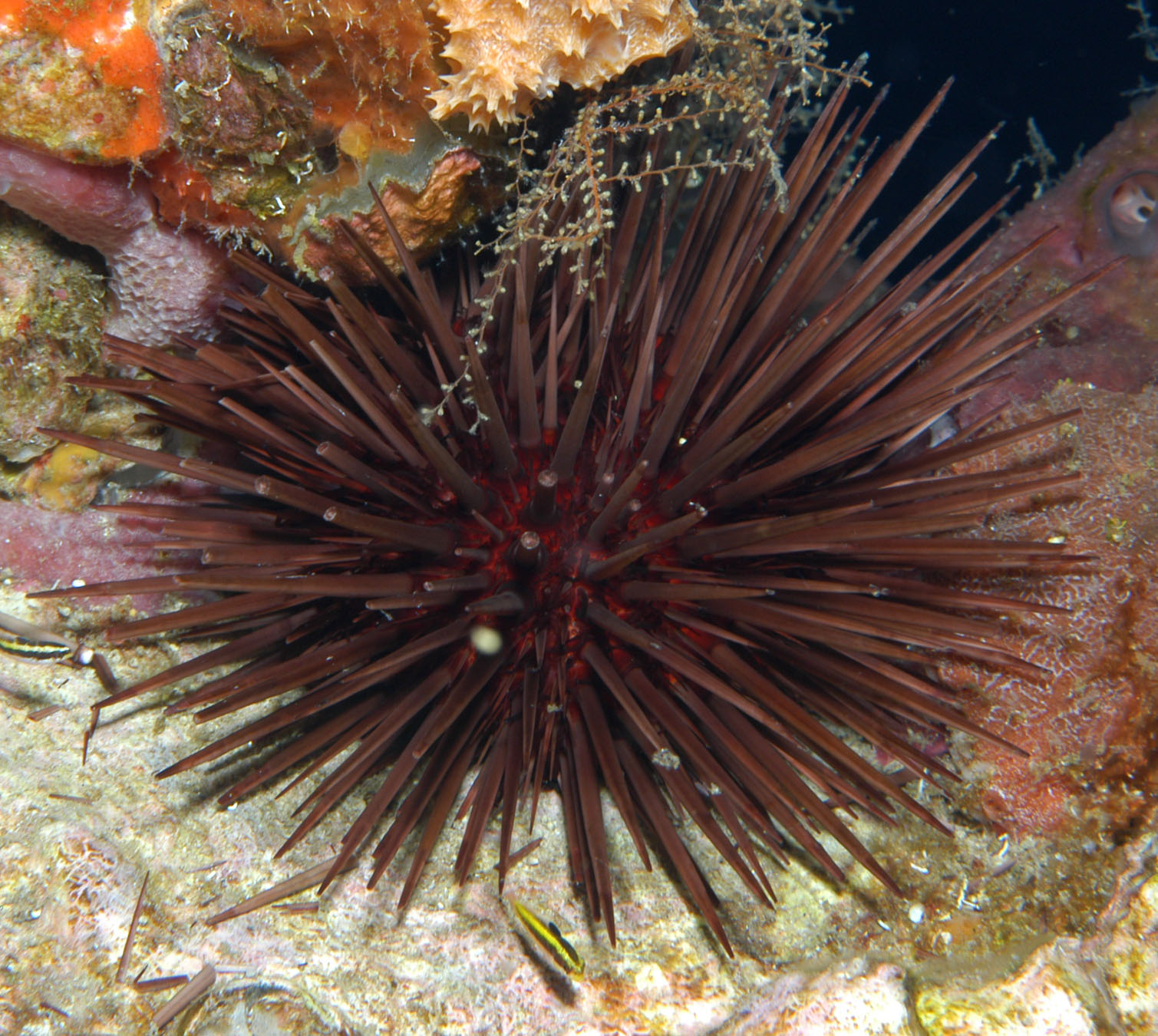
Arbacia punctulata

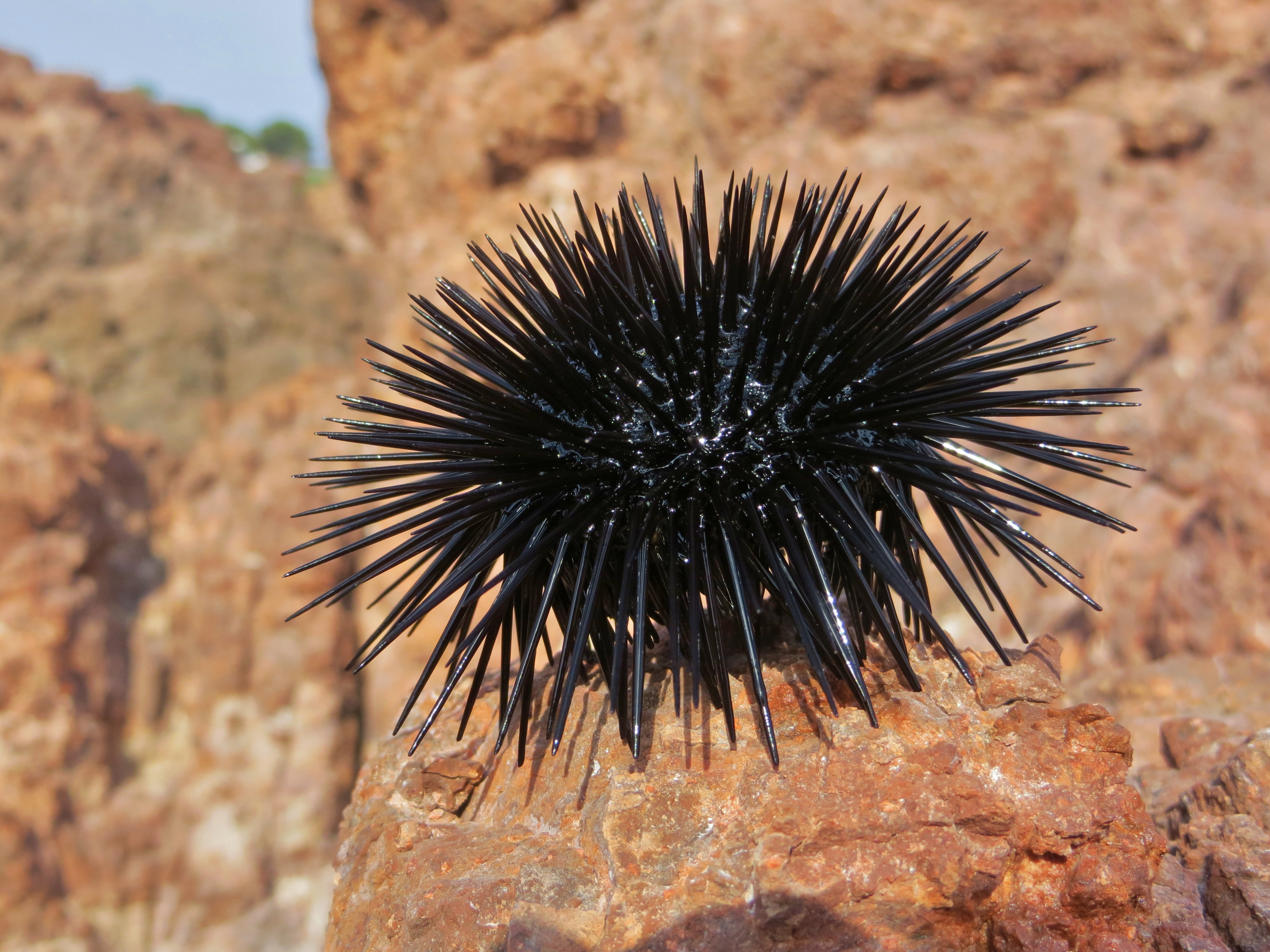
Arbacia lixula
