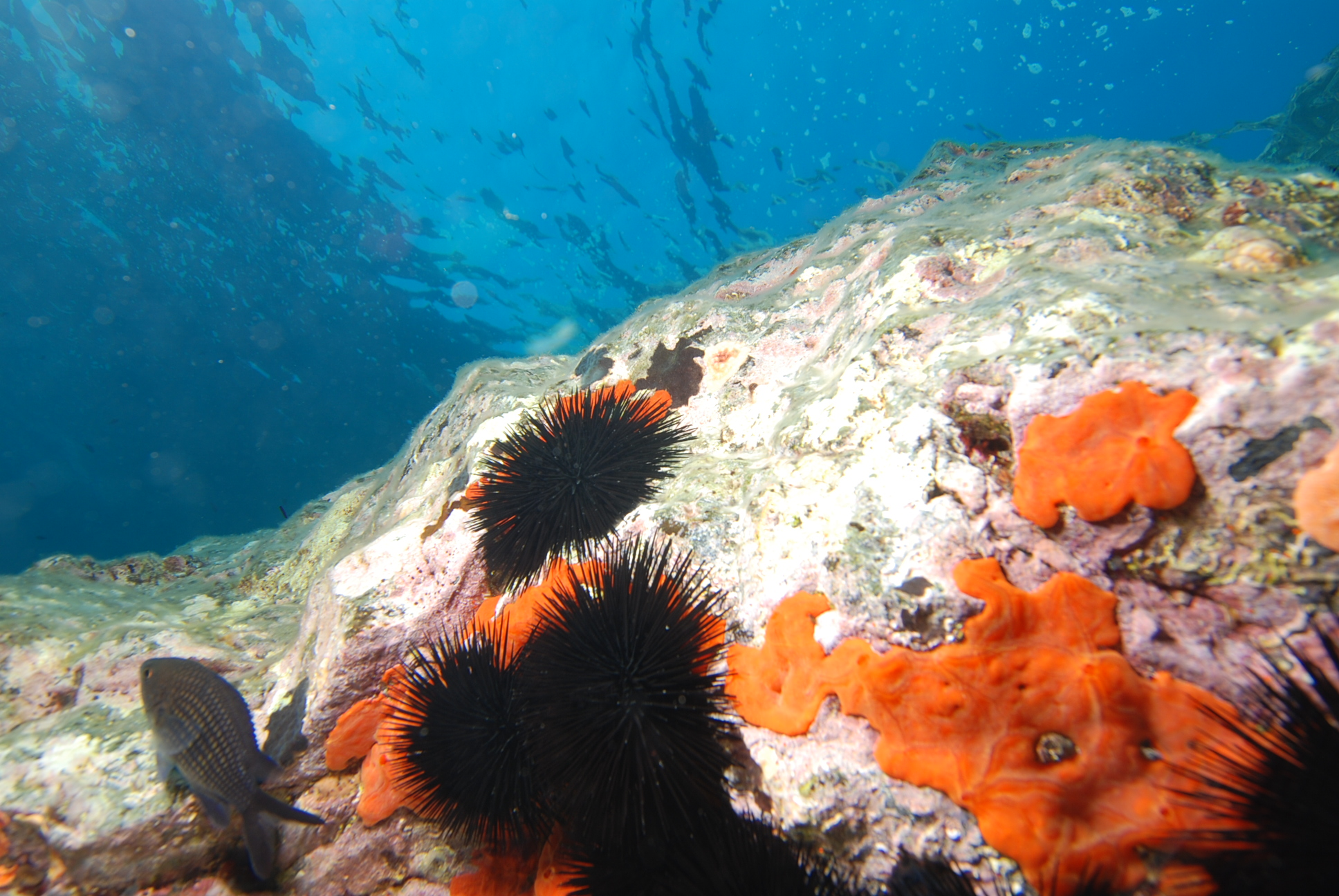
- Arbacia lixula

Scientific classification
- Kingdom: Animalia
- Phylum: Echinodermata
- Class: Echinoidea
- Superorder: Echinacea
- Order: Arbacioida; Gregory, 1900
- Family: Arbaciidae; Gray, 1855

= Arbacioida =

Arbacioida Temporal range: Middle Jurassic–recent

Order of sea urchins

Arbacioida are an order of sea urchins, consisting of a single extant family, the Arbaciidae. They are distinguished from other sea urchins by the presence of five separate plates around the anus. Unlike their close relatives, the Salenioida, all of the tubercles on their tests are of similar size.

This order includes about 50 species (roughly 24 extant) divided into 14 genera:

- Arbacia Gray, 1835
- Arbaciella Mortensen, 1910
- Arbia Cooke, 1948†
- Baueria Noetling, 1885†
- Codiopsis Agassiz, in Agassiz & Desor, 1846†
- Coelopleurus Agassiz, 1840a
- Cottaldia Desor, 1856 †
- Dialithocidaris Agassiz, 1898
- Habrocidaris Agassiz & Clark, 1907b
- Hattopsis Ali, 1992†
- Podocidaris Agassiz, 1869
- Pygmaeocidaris Döderlein, 1905
- Sexpyga Shigei, 1975
- Tetrapygus Agassiz, 1841b
