= Slate pencil urchin =

Slate pencil urchin (named after slate pencil) is a common name for several sea urchin species with blunt spines:

- Eucidaris, a genus with several tropical species, especially:
  - Eucidaris thouarsii, an East Pacific species
  - Eucidaris tribuloides, an Atlantic species
- Heterocentrotus, a genus with two Indo-Pacific species
