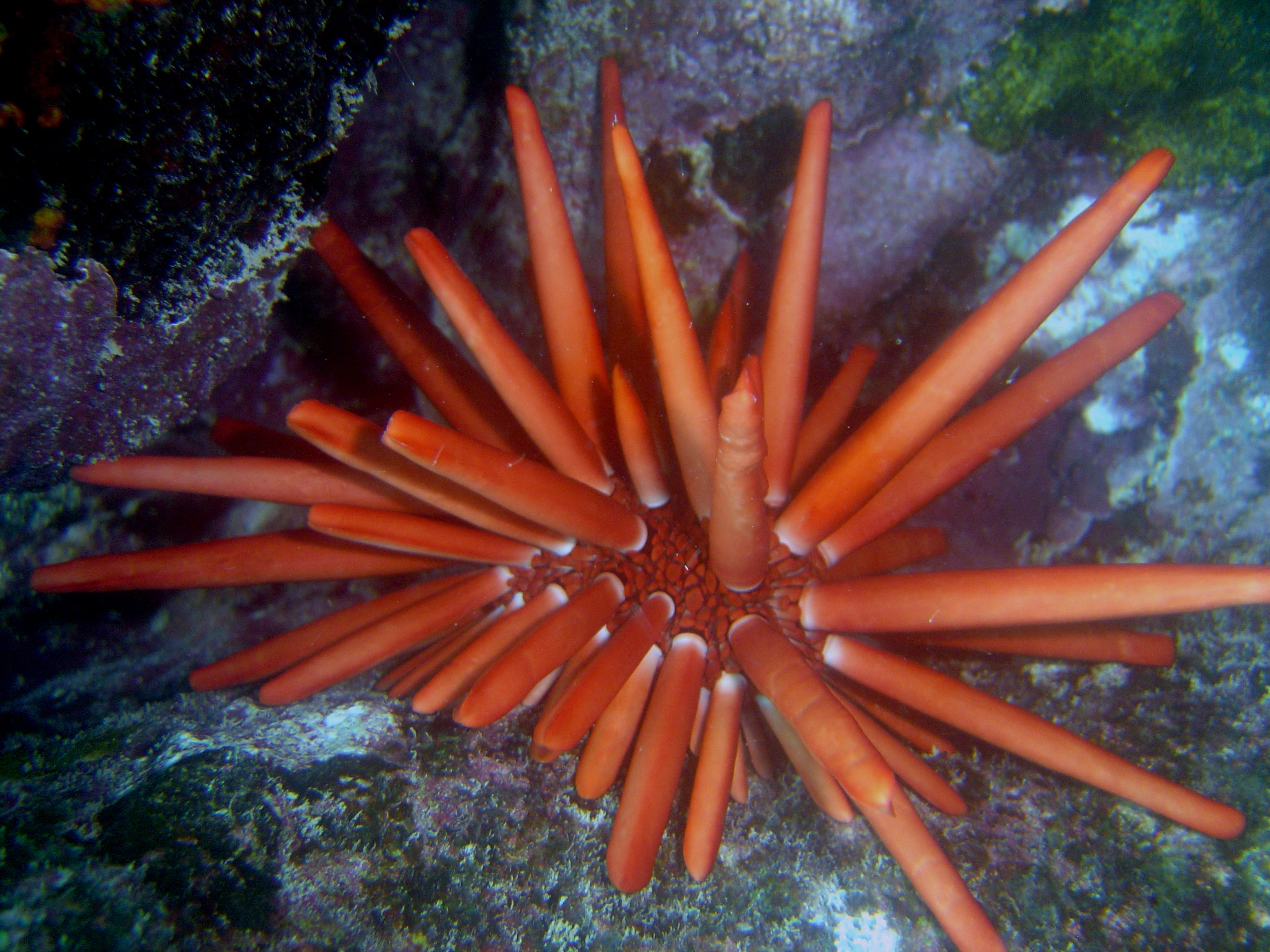

Scientific classification
- Kingdom: Animalia
- Phylum: Echinodermata
- Class: Echinoidea
- Order: Camarodonta
- Family: Echinometridae
- Genus: Heterocentrotus; Brandt, 1835

Species
- 2 species (see text)

= Heterocentrotus =

Heterocentrotus Temporal range: Miocene–recent, 15.97–0 Ma

Genus of sea urchins

Heterocentrotus is a genus of the family Echinometridae. They are mainly found in the Indo-Pacific basin, especially in Reunion or Hawaii. This genus appeared in the Miocene and spread throughout the warm Indo-Pacific.

== Description ==
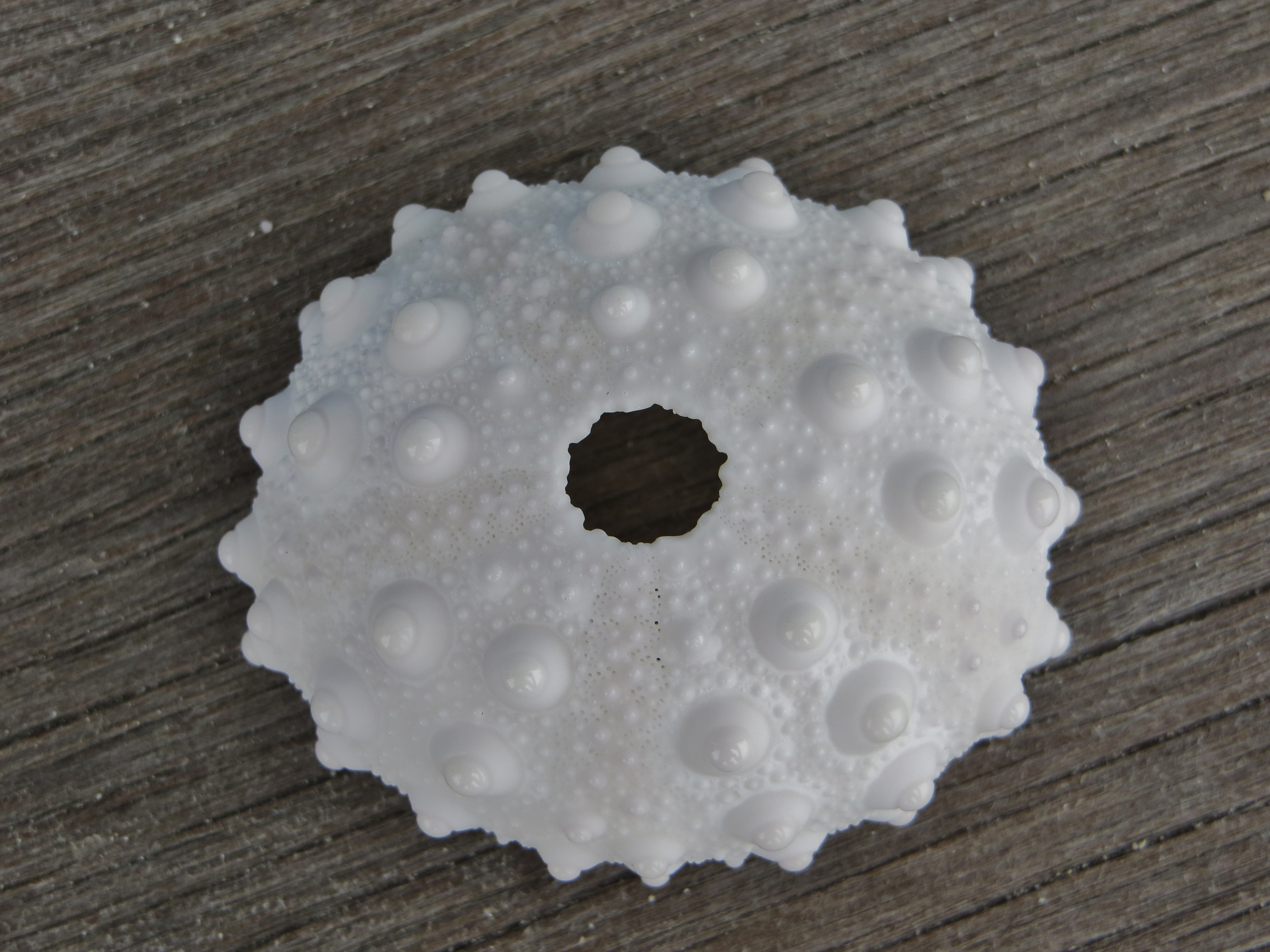
test of Heterocentrotus mamillatus

Heterocentrotus are brightly colored tropical sea urchins with very thick spines that have given them the nickname "slate pencil urchins", named after slate pencil.

The genus consists of sea urchins with rounded (but slightly elliptical) test, with the peristome (mouth) located in the center of the oral surface (lower) and the periproct at opposite, at the apex of the aboral (upper) face.

The apical disc is dicyclic, with a reduced periproct. The peristome is also reduced and elliptical, with limited mouth notches. The ambulacrum are polygeminate, with between 9 and 14 pairs of pores per plate, arranged in more or less regular arcs, sometimes almost in bands. All ambulacral plates bear a single, large primary tubercle, occupying almost the entire surface of the plate. The interambulacral plates bear a single, massive nipple, flanked by secondary tubercles on the aboral surface. The radioles are very thick and dense, usually three-faceted (or two or four, or round, mainly in H. mamillatus). They are never modified into scales or plates (unlike Colobocentrotus), but the secondary, short radioles can have an almost rounded shape.

== List of species ==
This genus contains two species:

Image	Scientific name	Distribution
	Heterocentrotus mamillatus (Linnaeus, 1758)	Indo-Pacific region (from the east coast of Africa to the Pacific archipelagos),
	Heterocentrotus trigonarius (Lamarck, 1816)	Indo-Pacific region.

These two species are very close visually, and often difficult to distinguish, since they generally share the same distribution area. The main criteria for in situ identification are the radioles, which are generally longer (especially on the aboral side) and more clearly triangular in H. trigonarius, which never has bifacial radioles on its underside. H. trigonarius is also usually darker (brown, dark orange...), but the great variability of colorations in this genus makes this criterion delicate. H. mamillatus often has the secondary radioles white or the base of the primary radioles surrounded by a white ring, which never seems to be seen in H. trigonarius, which is almost always entirely monochromatic (with perhaps the test being slightly darker than the radioles primary). Mamillatus radioles also often bear lighter rings, which does not seem to be seen in H. trigonarius either.

Skeletal-wise, H. mamillatus has less petalloid aboral ambulacral zones than its sister species, and fewer pore pairs per ambulacral plate (9-12 versus 15-16).

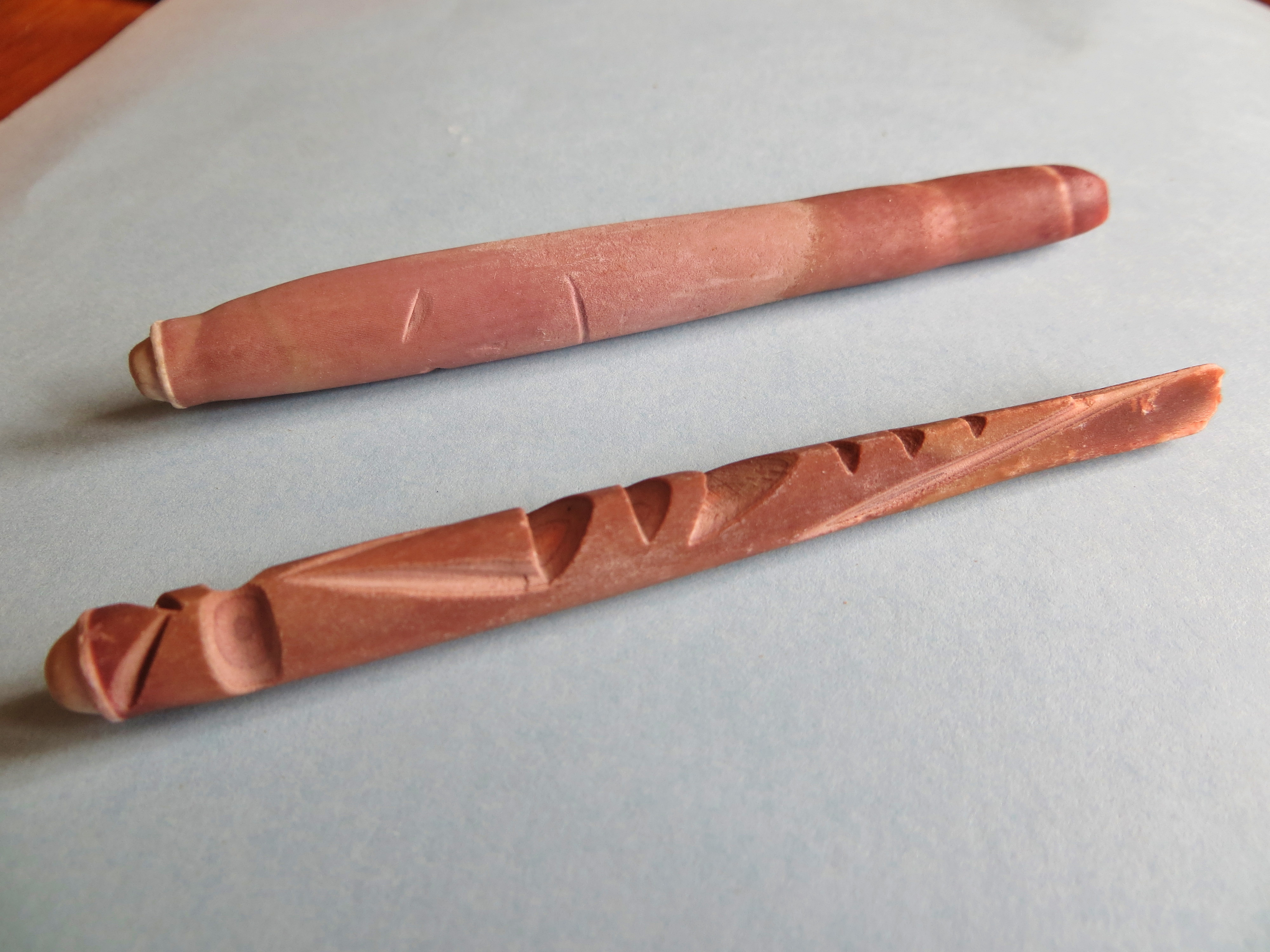
Radiols (spikes) of Heterocentrotus mamillatus sculpted

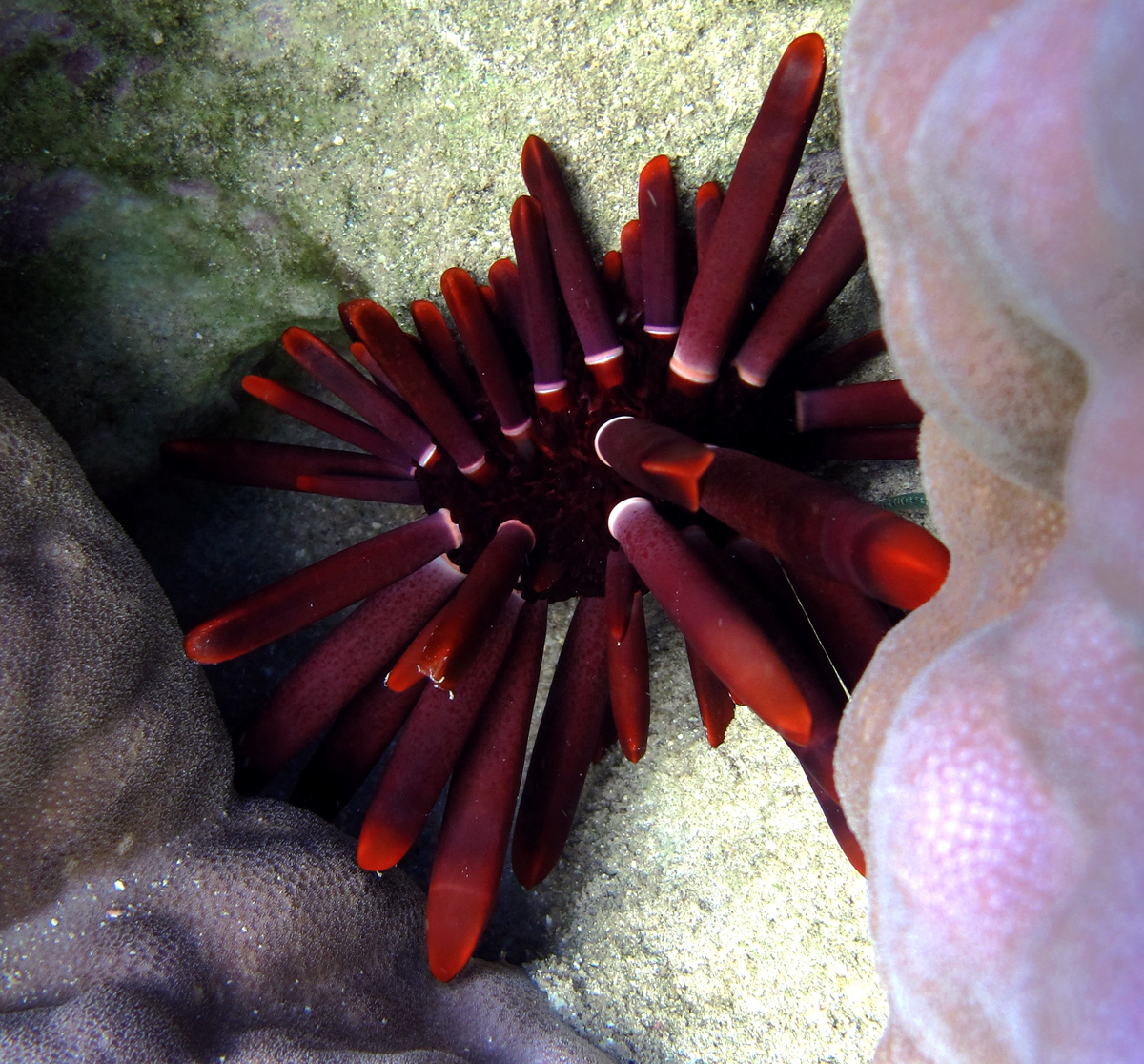
Heterocentrotus mamillatus

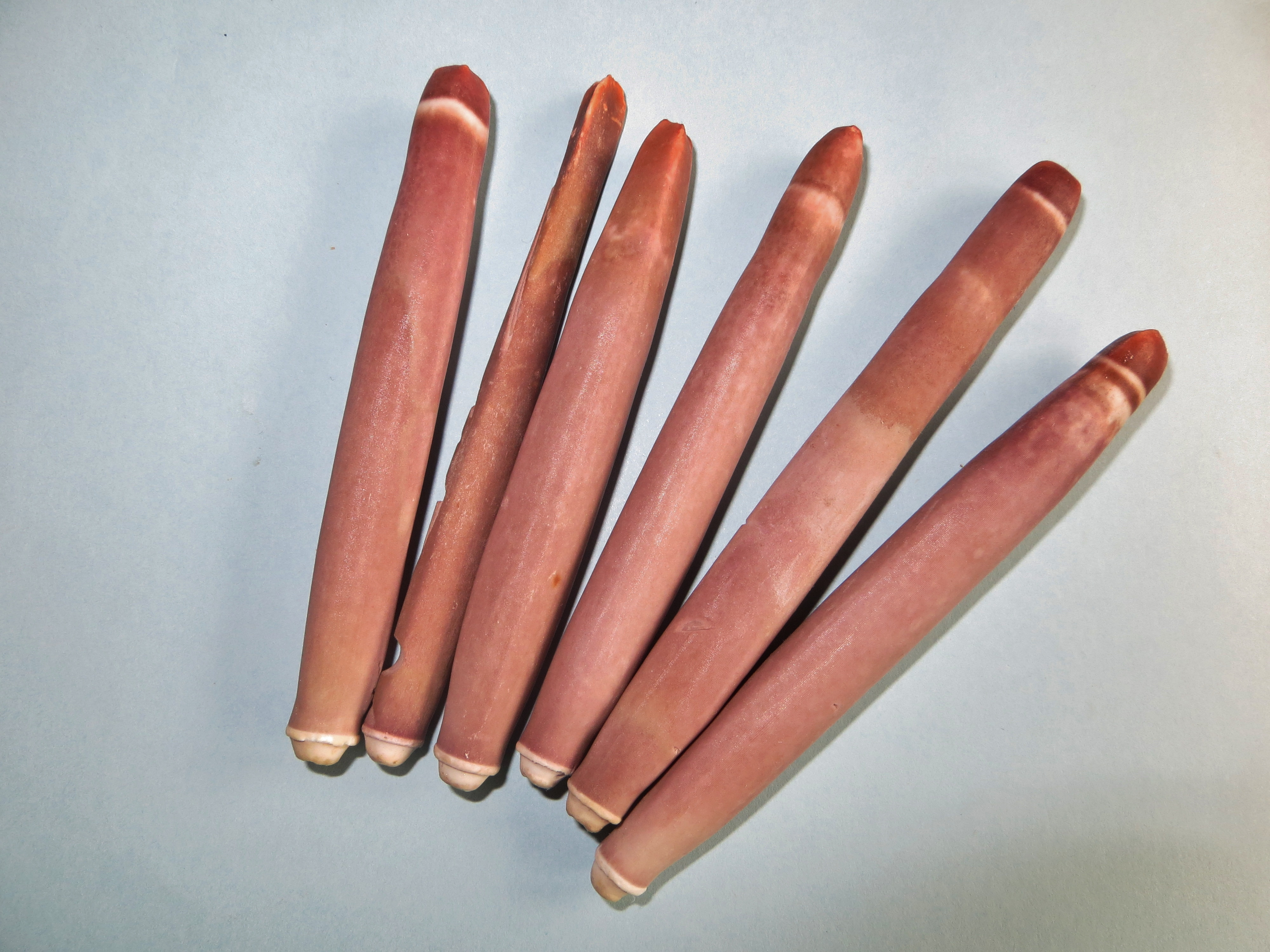
Radiols (spikes) of a "slate pencil sea urchin" (Heterocentrotus mamillatus). They are a classical souvenir.
