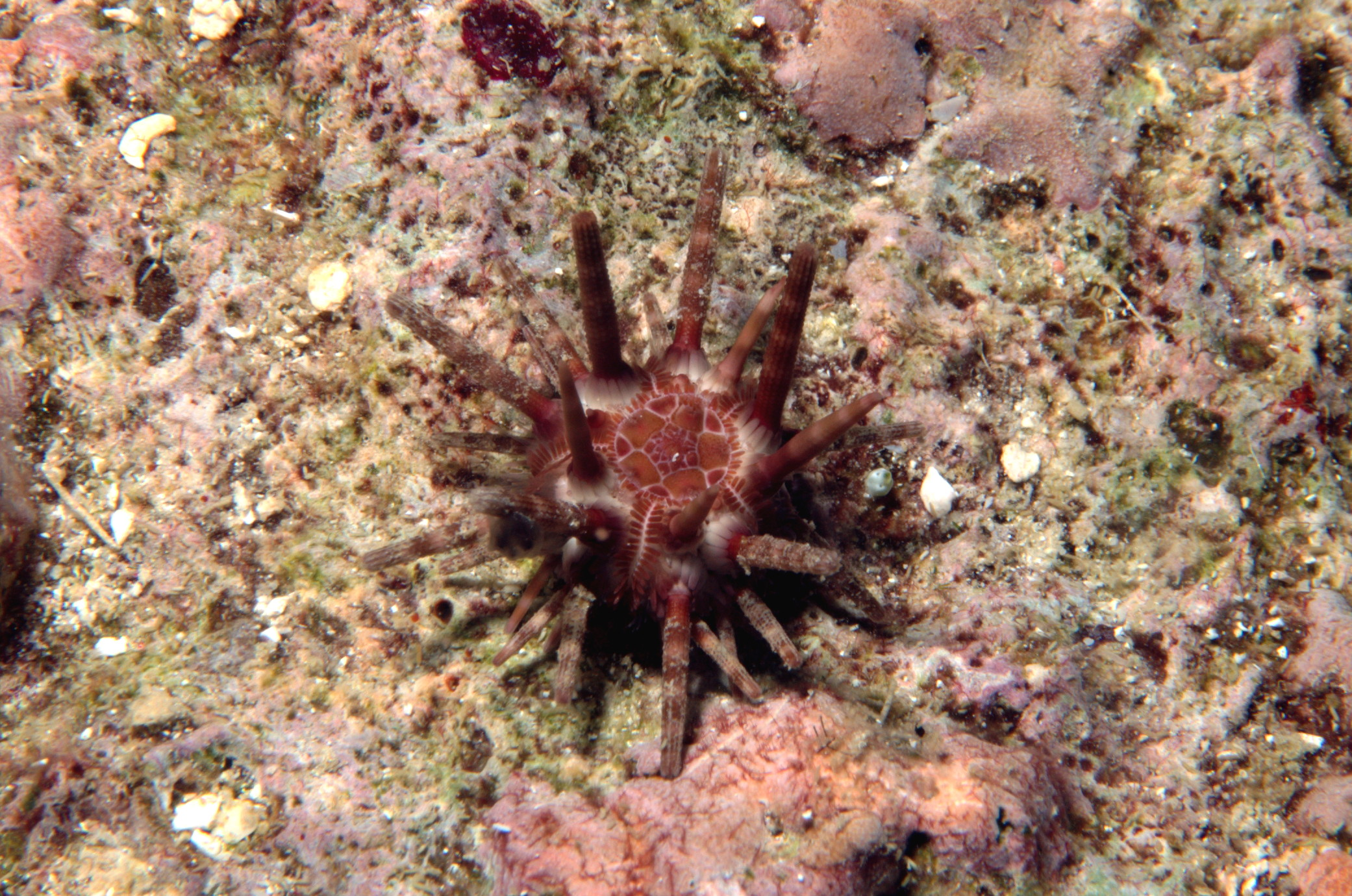

Scientific classification
- Kingdom: Animalia
- Phylum: Echinodermata
- Class: Echinoidea
- Order: Cidaroida
- Family: Cidaridae
- Genus: Eucidaris
- Species: E. metularia

Binomial name
- Eucidaris metularia (Lamarck, 1816)

Synonyms
- Cidaris (Dorocidaris) metularia (Lamarck, 1816); Cidaris (Eucidaris) metularia (Lamarck, 1816); Cidaris (Gymnocidaris) metularia (Lamarck, 1816); Cidaris mauri Lambert & Thiéry, 1910; Cidaris metularia (Lamarck, 1816); Cidarites metularia Lamarck, 1816; Gymnocidaris metularia (Lamarck, 1816); Gymnocidaris minor Agassiz, 1863

= Eucidaris metularia =

Species of echinoderm

Eucidaris metularia, the ten-lined urchin, is a species of sea urchins in the family Cidaridae. It is found in shallow parts of the Indo-Pacific Ocean and is characterised by its sparse covering of banded, flat-tipped spines.

== Description ==
Eucidaris metularia is a primitive species of sea urchin and comes from an ancient lineage that has hardly changed over the past 150 million years. The test is robust and somewhat flattened and up to 3 cm (1.2 in) in diameter. The ambulacra are almost straight and have horizontal pairs of pores. The primary spines are few in number, stout with a truncated tip and distinctively banded. The secondary spines surround the primaries and are more numerous, much smaller and flattened.

== Distribution and habitat ==
Eucidaris metularia is found in shallow parts of the Indo-Pacific Ocean. Its range includes the Red Sea, East Africa, Madagascar, the Seychelles, Aldabra and Chagos and extends as far east as Fiji, Hawaii, Japan, and northern Australia. It is a common species among seagrasses and in rocky back-reef lagoons, usually in shallow water, but sometimes at depths of down to 500 metres (1,600 ft). It also occurs under rocks and in crevices.

== Biology ==
The spines of Eucidaris metularia help it to avoid predation and are also used for moving across the sea bed. They often have bits of seaweed adhering to them which provides camouflage. This sea urchin feeds on algae, including coralline algae, and scavenges for organic detritus which it chews up with its powerful jaws. It also feeds on sponges, bryozoans and other small invertebrates.

Sea urchins release their gametes into the sea where external fertilization takes place. The larvae are planktonic and drift with the currents. The larvae of Eucidaris metularia and other members of the genus Eucidaris have distinctive fleshy lobes which enables them to be distinguished from other echinoid larvae. At metamorphosis, which takes place after the larvae have settled on the seabed, the rearrangement of tissues is much less extensive in these primitive species than is the case in more advanced echinoids.

== Research ==
Eucidaris metularia was one of several sea urchins used in research designed to examine the feasibility of using non-invasive magnetic resonance imaging technology to study internal anatomy. MRI was found to be a useful tool for comparative studies of the morphology of echinoids which extended the range of techniques available for use without destroying the specimen.
