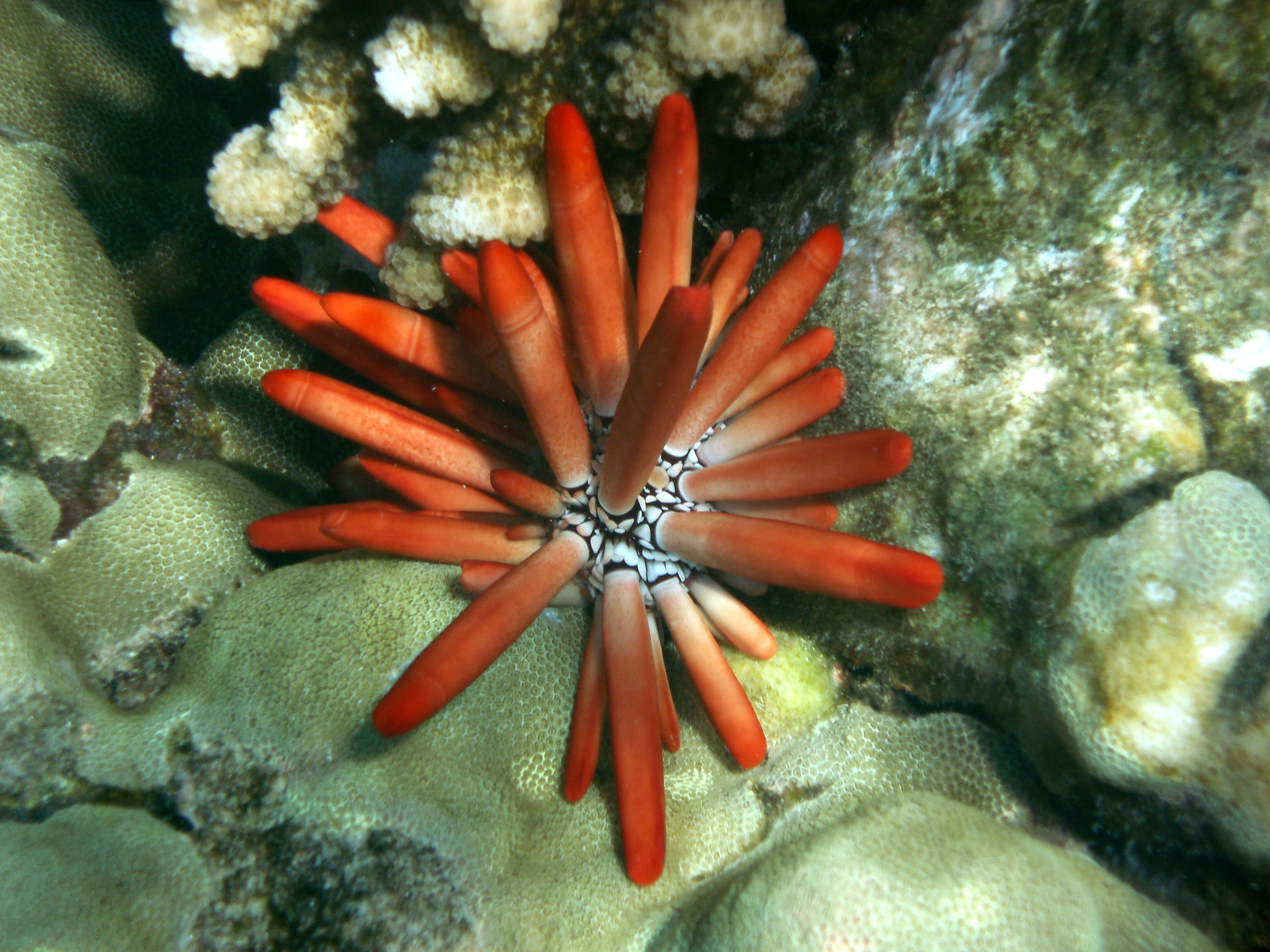

Scientific classification
- Kingdom: Animalia
- Phylum: Echinodermata
- Class: Echinoidea
- Order: Camarodonta
- Family: Echinometridae
- Genus: Heterocentrotus
- Species: H. mamillatus

Binomial name
- Heterocentrotus mamillatus (Linnaeus, 1758)

= Heterocentrotus mamillatus =

Species of echinoderm

Heterocentrotus mamillatus, commonly known as the slate pencil urchin, red slate pencil urchin, or red pencil urchin, is a species of tropical sea urchin from the Indo-Pacific region.

== Description ==
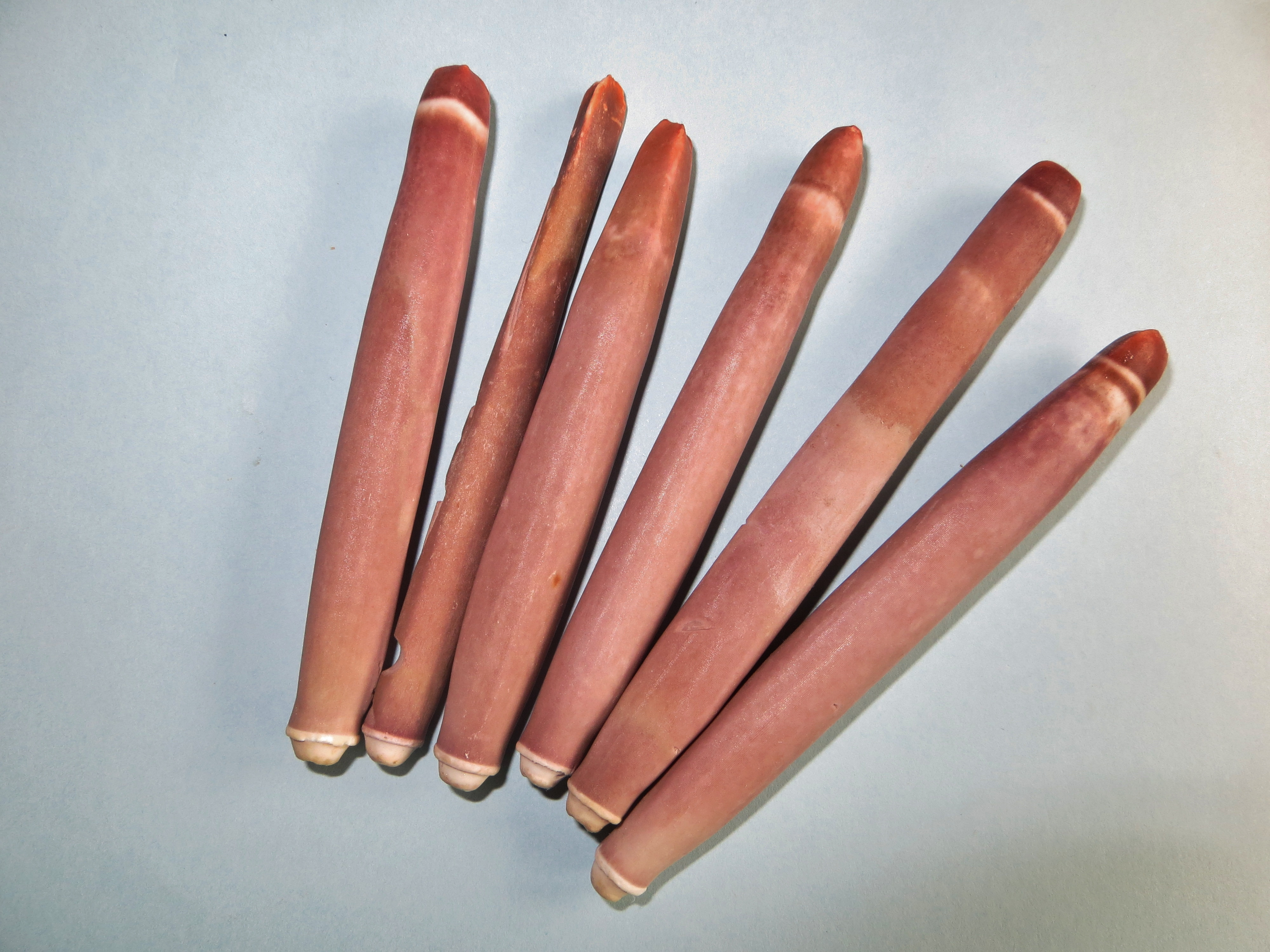
Radiols (spikes) of a "slate pencil sea urchin". They are a classical souvenir.

This species is a large sea urchin, capping in some specimens reaching over 8 cm in diameter, with spikes up to 10 cm. Most specimens are bright red, but brown and purple colorations are also seen. The spines may have a different color from the body. Spines have a white ring at their stem and have alternating light and dark rings. The spines are rounded to triangular in cross-section and taper towards the tip. Surprisingly during the night the red spines turn into a chalky pink. Specimens from Hawai‘i tend to have bright red spines, while specimens from other parts of the Pacific may have yellowish or brown spines.

Other variations of H. mammillatus, such as those living on the Ogasawara Islands, have slimmer spines instead of the species' characteristic thick, broad spines. It has been debated whether this specific variant truly belongs within the classification of H. mammillatus and not Heterocentrotus trigonarius, another type of pencil urchin. However, it has been concluded that the Ogasawara type is indeed a form of H. mammillatus.

Heterocentrotus trigonarius is a similar species that has longer and darker spines, more angular, and is always monochromic.

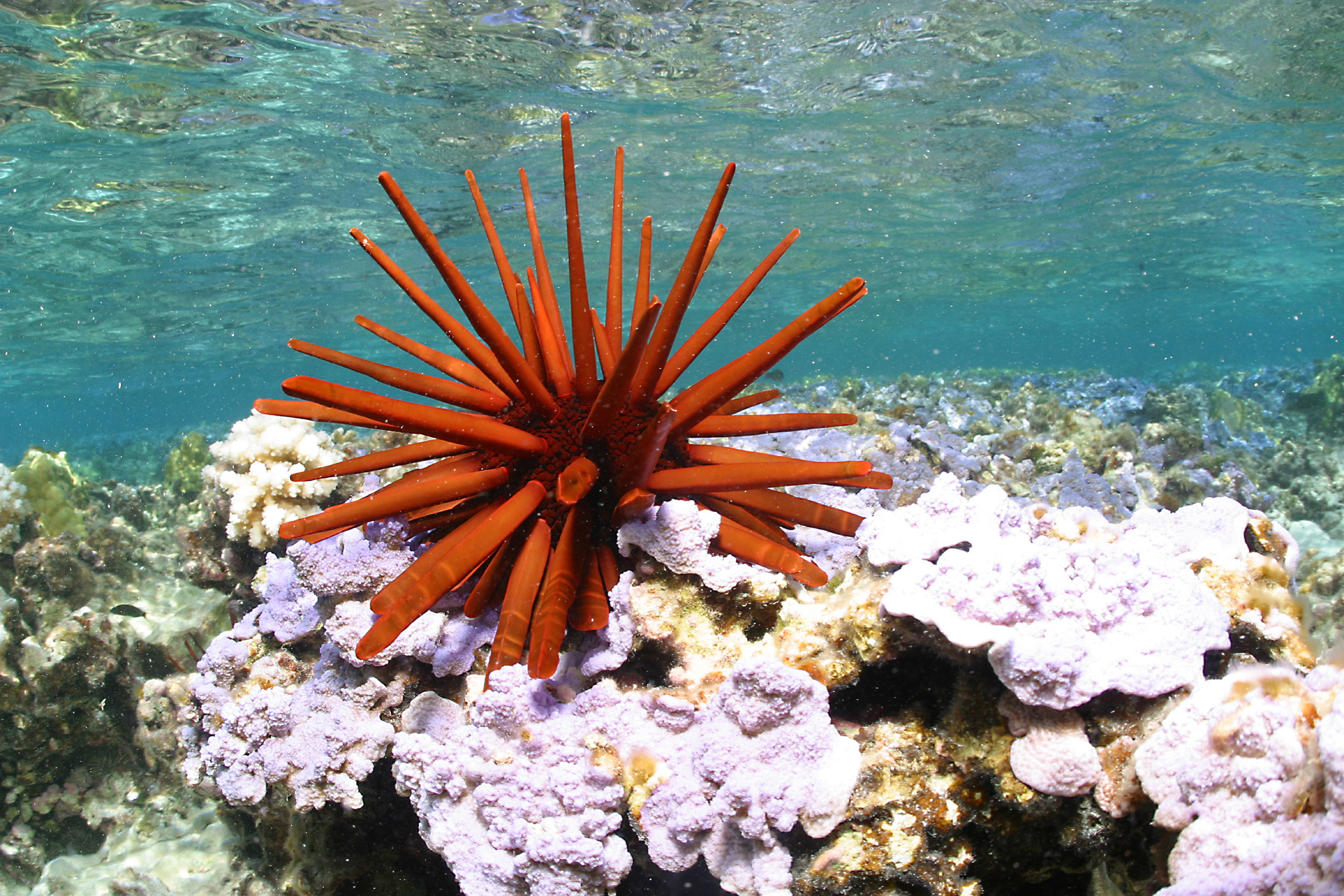
Red pencil urchin at French Frigate Shoals.

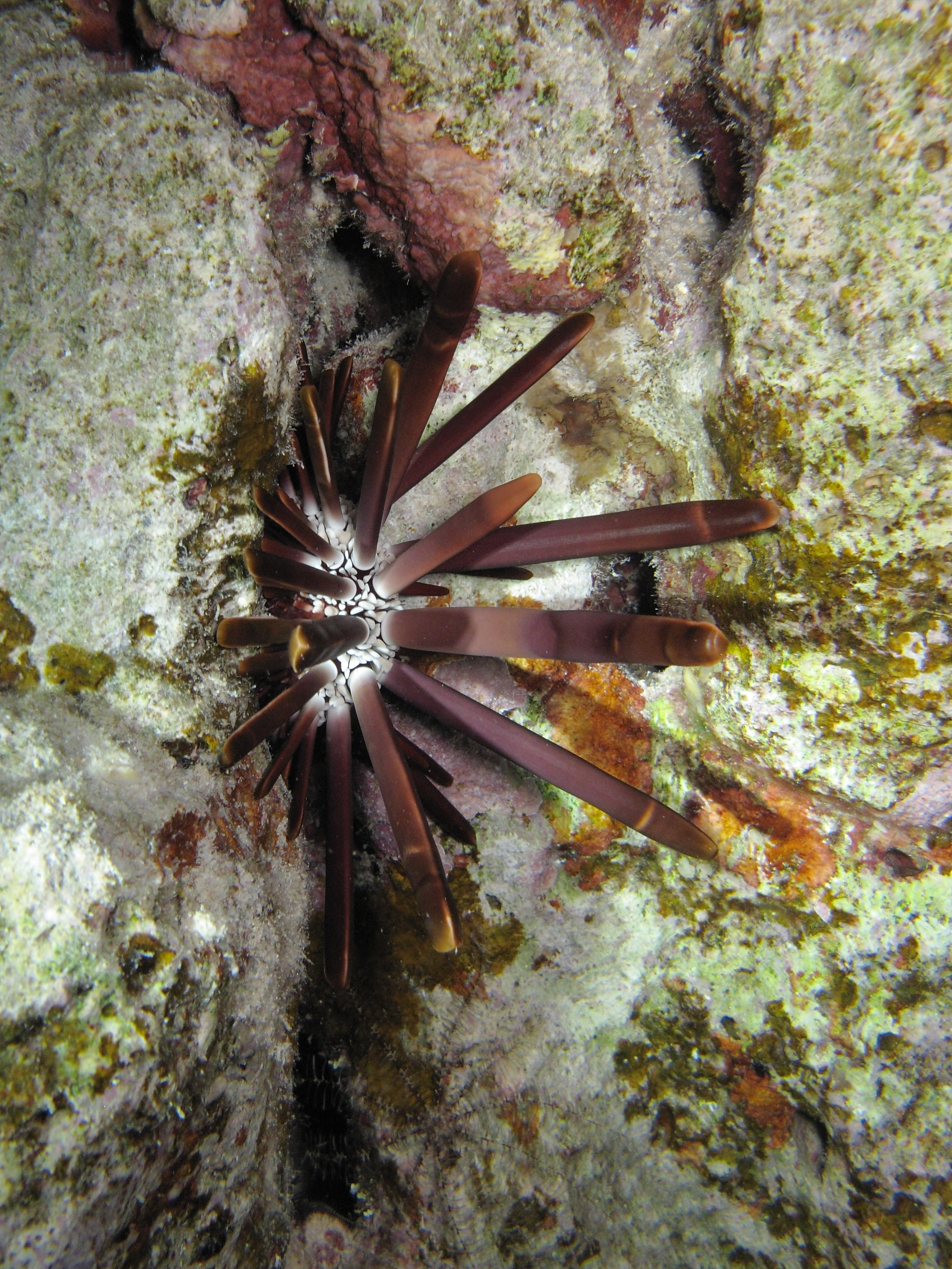
Brown H. mamillatus at the Red Sea

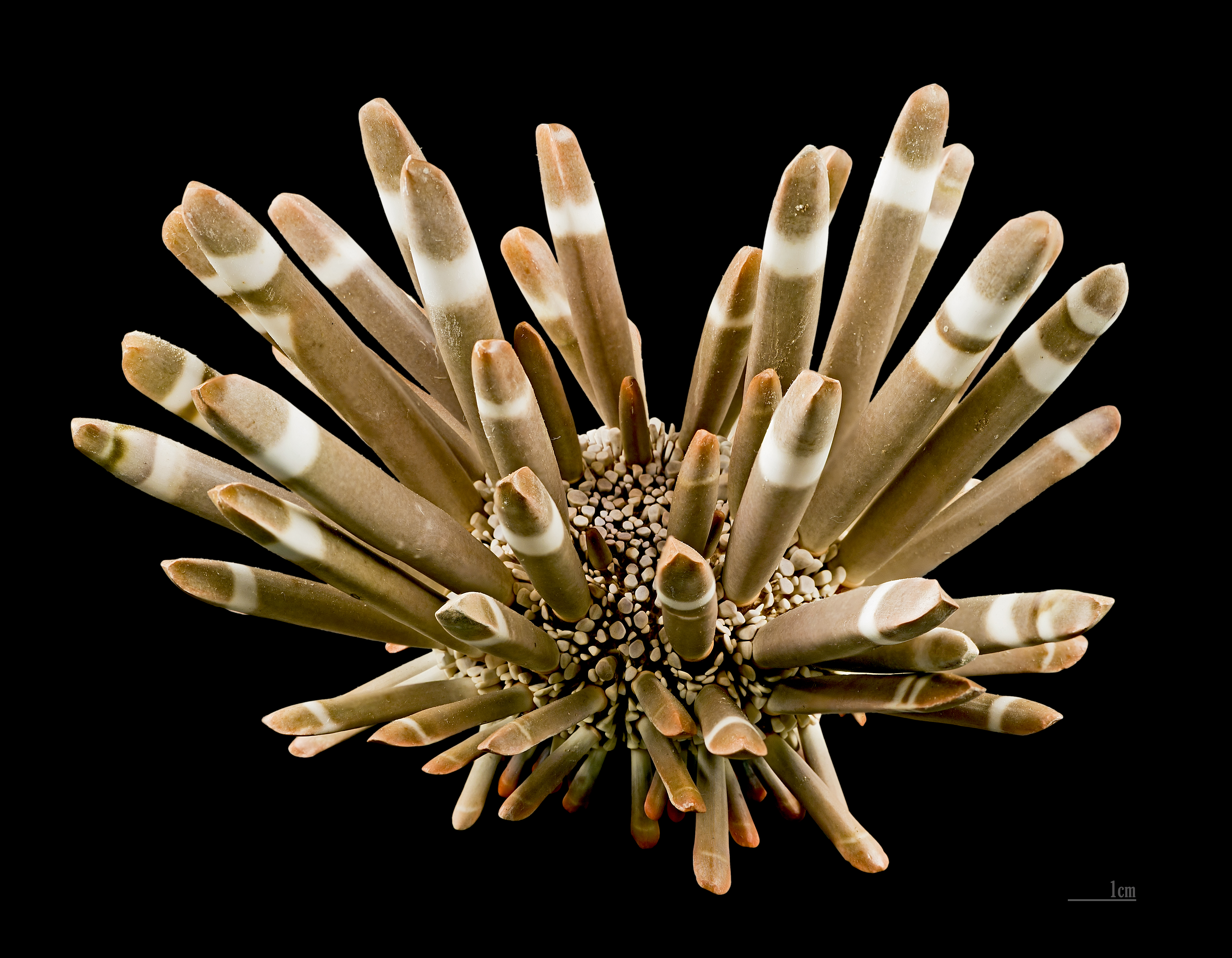
Brown dried specimen MHNT

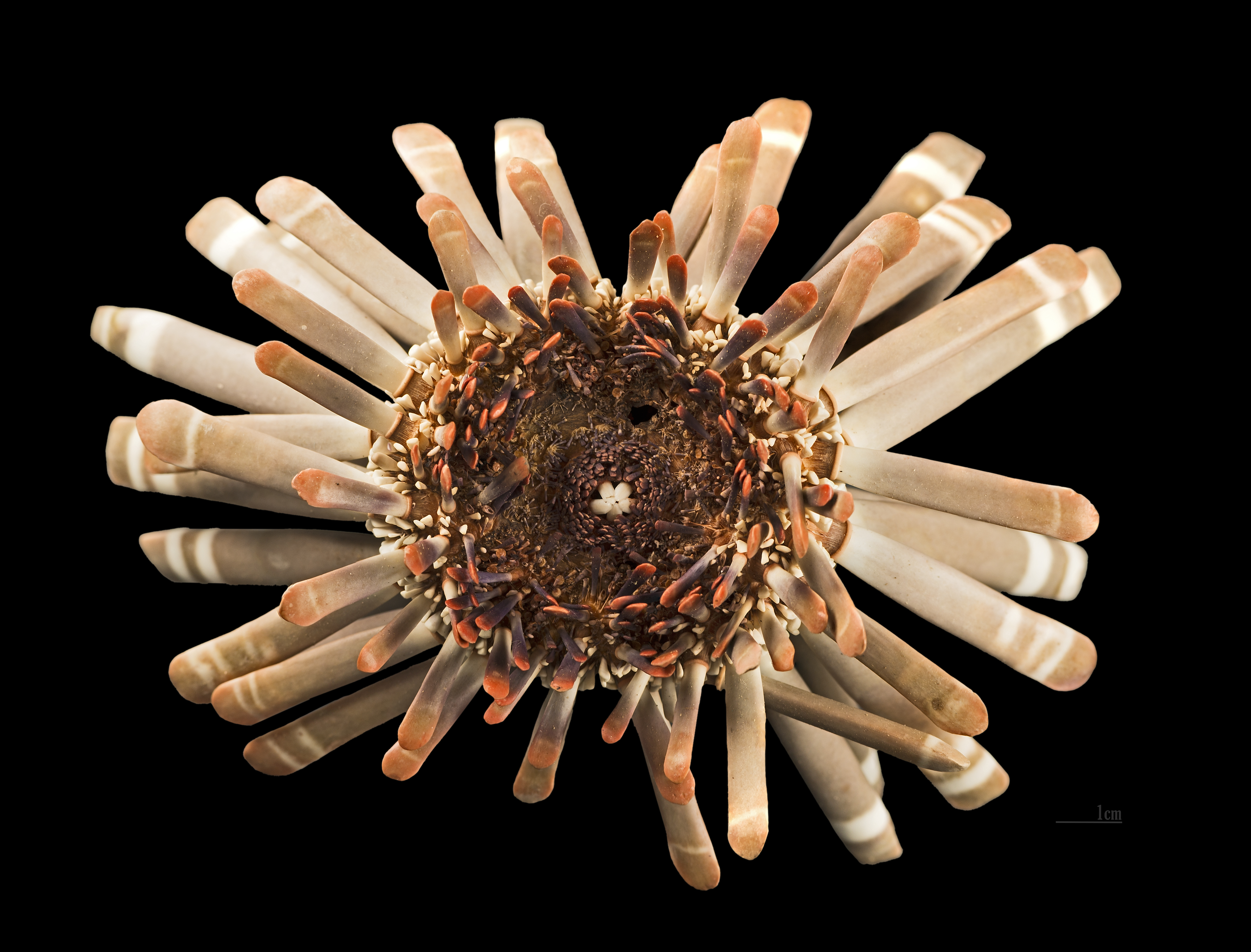
Brown dried specimen MHNT

== Range and habitat ==
This species can be found throughout the tropical waters of the Indo-Pacific region (from the east coast of Africa to the Pacific archipelagos), but is especially abundant in Hawai‘i. It can also be found on the shores of the Sinai Peninsula.Pencil Urchins generally need 32-35 ppt (parts per thousands) of salt in the water that they live in. H. mammillatus is found in reefs in depths from eight to 25 meters. It roams the subtidal zones of these areas and appears to prefer burrowing into hard sediments, like limestone, coral, and basalt. The juveniles of this species of urchin can be found hiding under rocks.

== Diet and behavior ==
H. mammillatus predominantly feeds on encrusting coralline algae, but has been noted to consume small amounts of other algae, like Pterocladia and Ulva. Sea urchins are primarily marine grazers and tend to eat the algae in closest proximity to them. Thus, several species live a rather sedentary lifestyle. However, Heterocentrotus mammillatus appears to be somewhat active in comparison to other urchins, like Echinothrix calamaris, Echinometra mathaei, and Echinometra oblonga. H. mammillatus was observed to travel up to 600 cm away from its starting site and moved an average of 96 cm per day (Ogden et al., 1989).

== Predators ==
Heterocentrotus mammillatus shares many of the same predators as the other tropical sea urchins living in its habitat. For example, fish, such as those belonging to the families Balistidae, Labridae, and Lethrinidae, are known to prey on sea urchins. H. mammillatus is also collected and eaten by humans, though not as often as Tripneustes gratilla is.

== Spines ==
Heterocentrotus mammillatus has thick, rounded spines that allow it to bore into hard substrates and defend itself against predators, wave drag, and pressure. Similar to other sea urchins, its spines are made of magnesium calcite arranged into a porous network, allowing for the passage of fluids and organic matter within the spines. The spines have a dense base and become more porous up towards the tip. However, H. mammillatus is unique in how its spines contain other layers of dense material organized throughout, sandwiching the more delicate porous layers. The layered structure allows for graceful failure, preserving the bottom layers of the spine which are farthest from the point of pressure. This graceful degradation occurs because energy is forced to travel through several layers and dissipates. The layered constitution of H. mammillatus’ spines also allows for crack deflection.

== Locomotion ==
Bilateral symmetry creates an anterior “front” end and posterior “back” end in living organisms. The anterior end of bilateral organisms often undergoes cephalization and becomes a “head”, hosting a cluster of sensory organs, the mouth, or both. This head often becomes a locomotor anterior in which the organism orients itself, moving forward so that the head of the body is first to approach the upcoming environment.

However, despite being bilaterally symmetrical, Heterocentrotus mammillatus does not possess a fixed locomotor anterior like many other bilaterally symmetrical organisms do, which allows it to proceed with equal ease in whatever direction it chooses. Instead, H. mammillatus seems to display temporary locomotor anteriors when moving, orienting itself in the direction that it first moves. Therefore, H. mammillatus often insists on continuing in its initial direction of movement, even if it is interrupted by being picked up or placed down in a different orientation.

== Reproduction ==
Like other sea urchins, Heterocentrotus mammillatus periodically develops gametes to be released into the water for fertilization and undergoes a rest period in order to resume the cycle again. However, the timing and duration of these cycles varies from urchin to urchin. H. mammillatus from a reef near where the Gulf of Aqaba meets the Red Sea displayed an annual reproductive cycle. Its resting period is from October to January, accumulating nutrients in its gonads in preparation for gametogenesis. It begins gametogenesis in January and finishes in May, during which its gonads are nearly completely filled with gametes. Spawning usually occurs between May and June, but sometimes can take until October for all the urchins to finish releasing their eggs and sperm. The start and end times of these periods are not always rigid and can vary by a couple months.

This data on H. mammillatus’ reproduction indicates a possible lunar or semilunar cycle in spawning and gametogenesis, meaning that H. mammillatus may take temporal cues from the Moon. Given that spawning did not always happen during the same phase of moon, other factors may contribute to the timing of H. mammillatus’ reproductive stages (such as the tidal cycle, for example).

== Organisms associated with H. mammillatus ==
The small shrimp, Levicaris mammillata, has been found clinging to the spines of Heterocentrotus mammillatus in Hawaii, the Ogasawara Islands, and the Ryukyu Islands. The relationship between this shrimp and H. mammillatus has not been fully characterized yet, but it is theorized that the shrimp functions as a cleaner to H. mammillatus rather than a malignant parasite.
