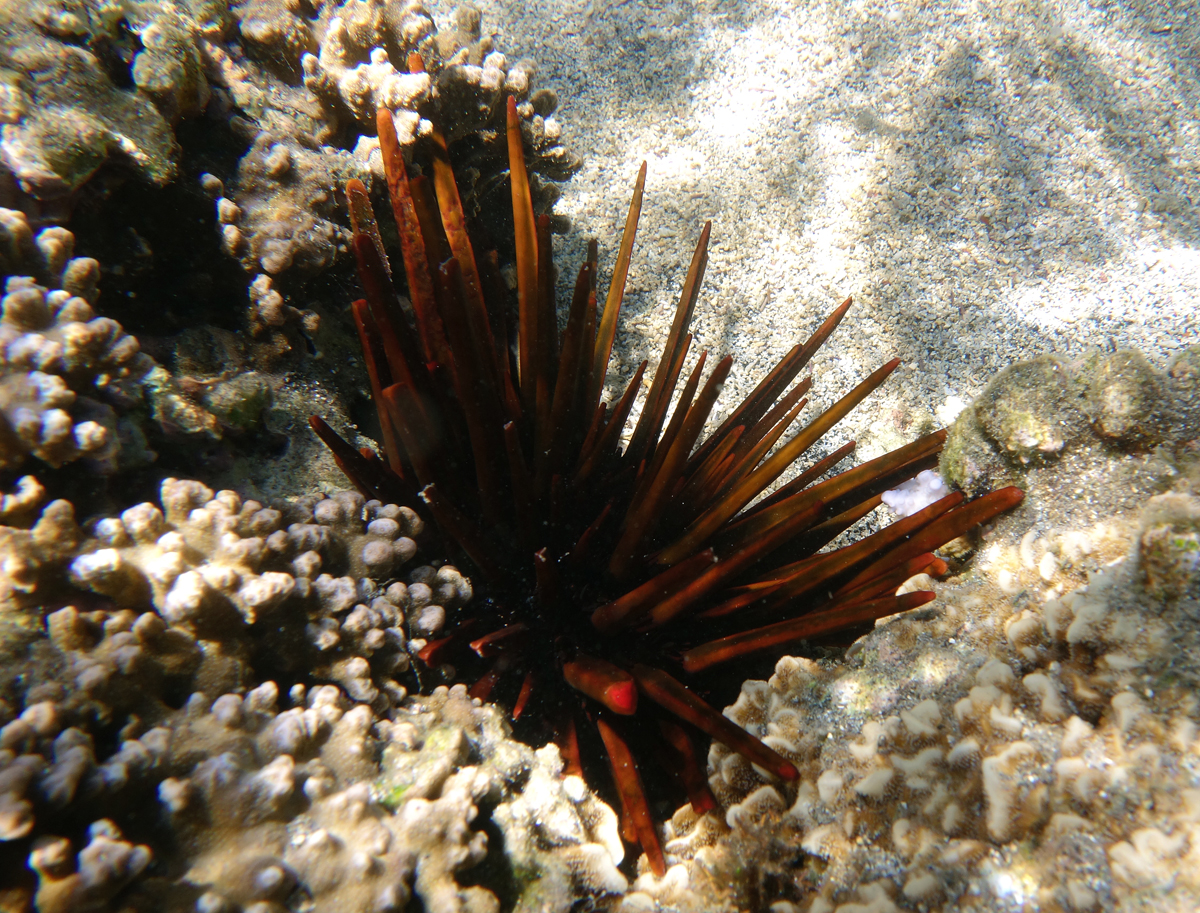

Scientific classification
- Kingdom: Animalia
- Phylum: Echinodermata
- Class: Echinoidea
- Order: Camarodonta
- Family: Echinometridae
- Genus: Heterocentrotus
- Species: H. trigonarius

Binomial name
- Heterocentrotus trigonarius (Lamarck, 1816)

= Heterocentrotus trigonarius =

Species of sea urchin

Heterocentrotus trigonarius, commonly known as the slate pencil urchin or red slate pencil urchin, is found in the tropical waters of the Indo-Pacific region. Heterocentrotus mamillatus is a similar, related species.

Heterocentrotus trigonarius can grow to 30 cm (12 in) in diameter (spine-to-spine). The spines are potentially harmful to humans if trodden on.
