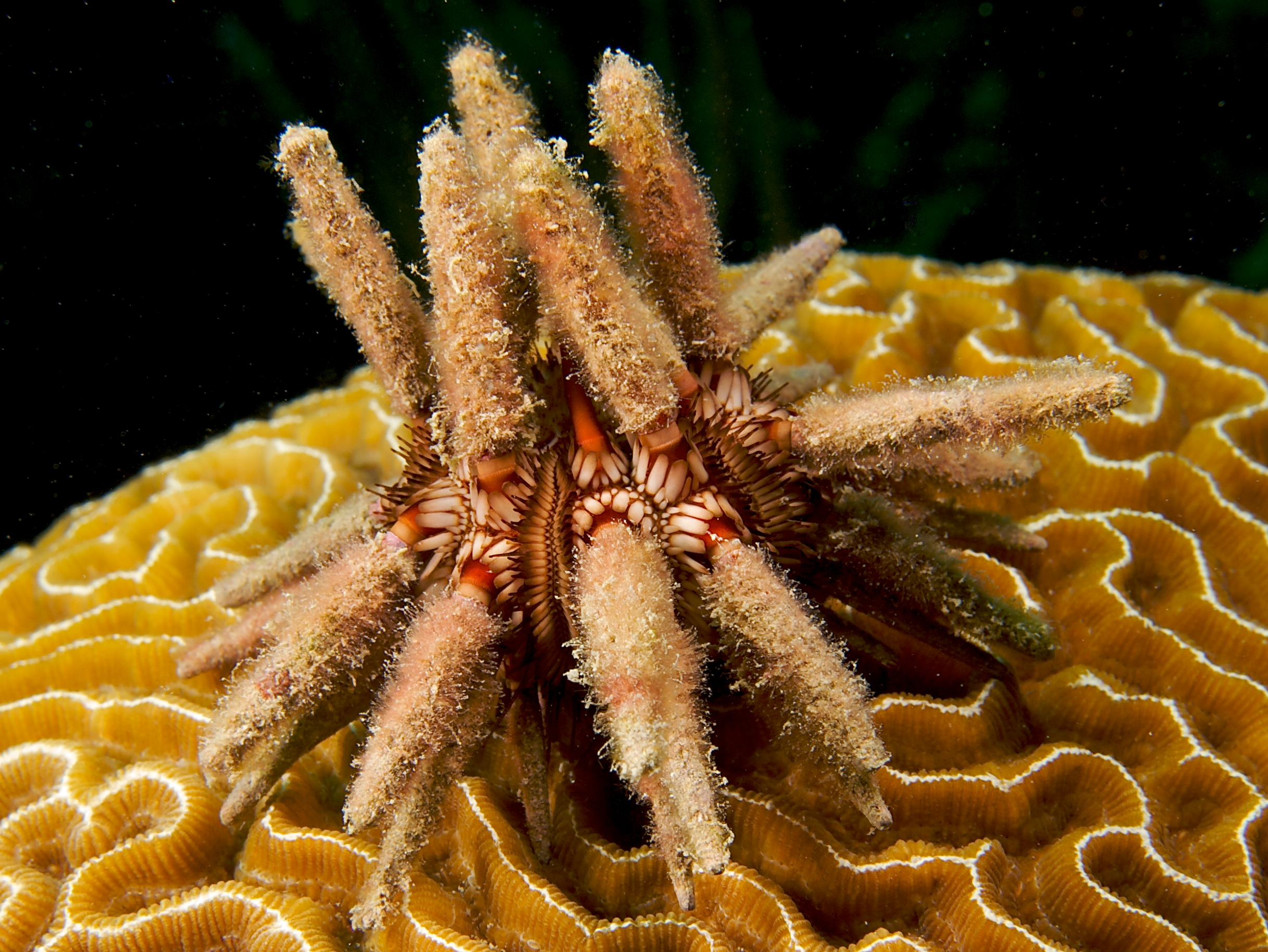
- Eucidaris tribuloides on a brain coral

Scientific classification
- Kingdom: Animalia
- Phylum: Echinodermata
- Class: Echinoidea
- Order: Cidaroida
- Family: Cidaridae
- Subfamily: Cidarinae
- Genus: Eucidaris; Pomel, 1883

Type species
- Cidarites monilifera Goldfuss, 1829

Species
- See text

= Eucidaris =

Genus of sea urchins

Eucidaris is a genus of cidaroid sea urchins known as slate pencil urchins (named after slate pencil). They are characterised by a moderately thick test, a usually monocyclic apical disc, perforate and non-crenulate tubercles and nearly straight ambulacra with horizontal pore pairs. The primary spines are few and widely spaced, stout with blunt flat tips and beaded ornamentation and the secondary spines are short and apressed. They originated in the Miocene and extant members of the genus are found in the tropical Indo-Pacific Ocean, East Pacific, Atlantic Ocean and Caribbean Sea.

== Species ==
The World Register of Marine Species lists the following species:

- Eucidaris australiae Mortensen, 1950
- † Eucidaris coralloides Fell, 1954
- Eucidaris galapagensis Döderlein, 1887
- Eucidaris metularia (Lamarck, 1816)
- † Eucidaris strobilata Fell, 1954
- Eucidaris thouarsii (Agassiz & Desor, 1846)
- Eucidaris tribuloides (Lamarck, 1816)

Species brought into synonymy

- Eucidaris clavata Mortensen, 1928: synonym of Eucidaris tribuloides (Lamarck, 1816)
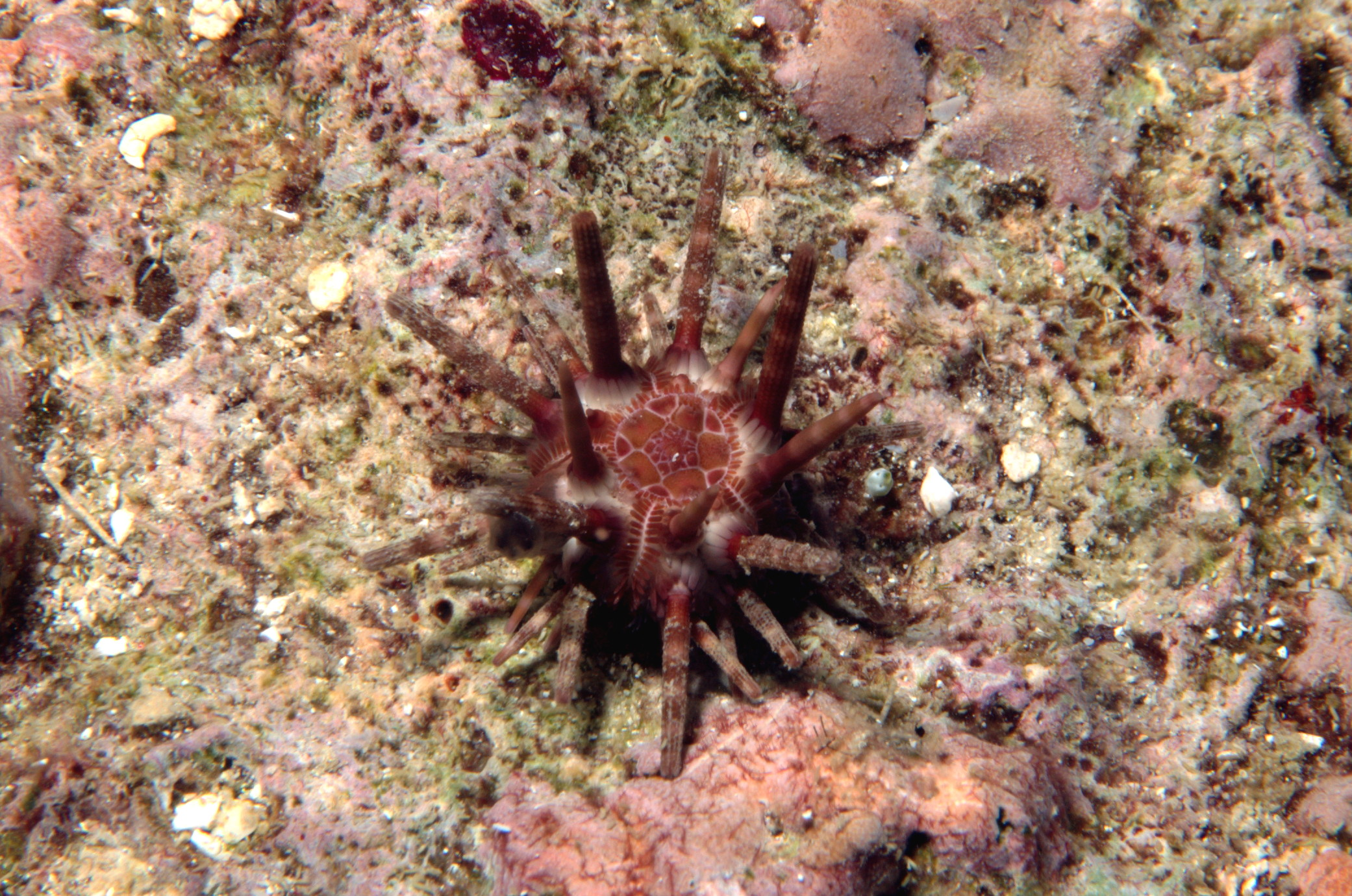
Eucidaris metularia

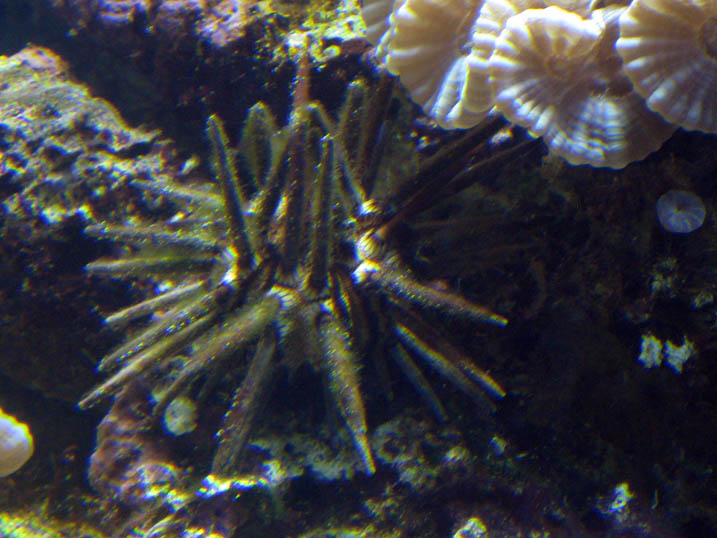
Eucidaris tribuloides

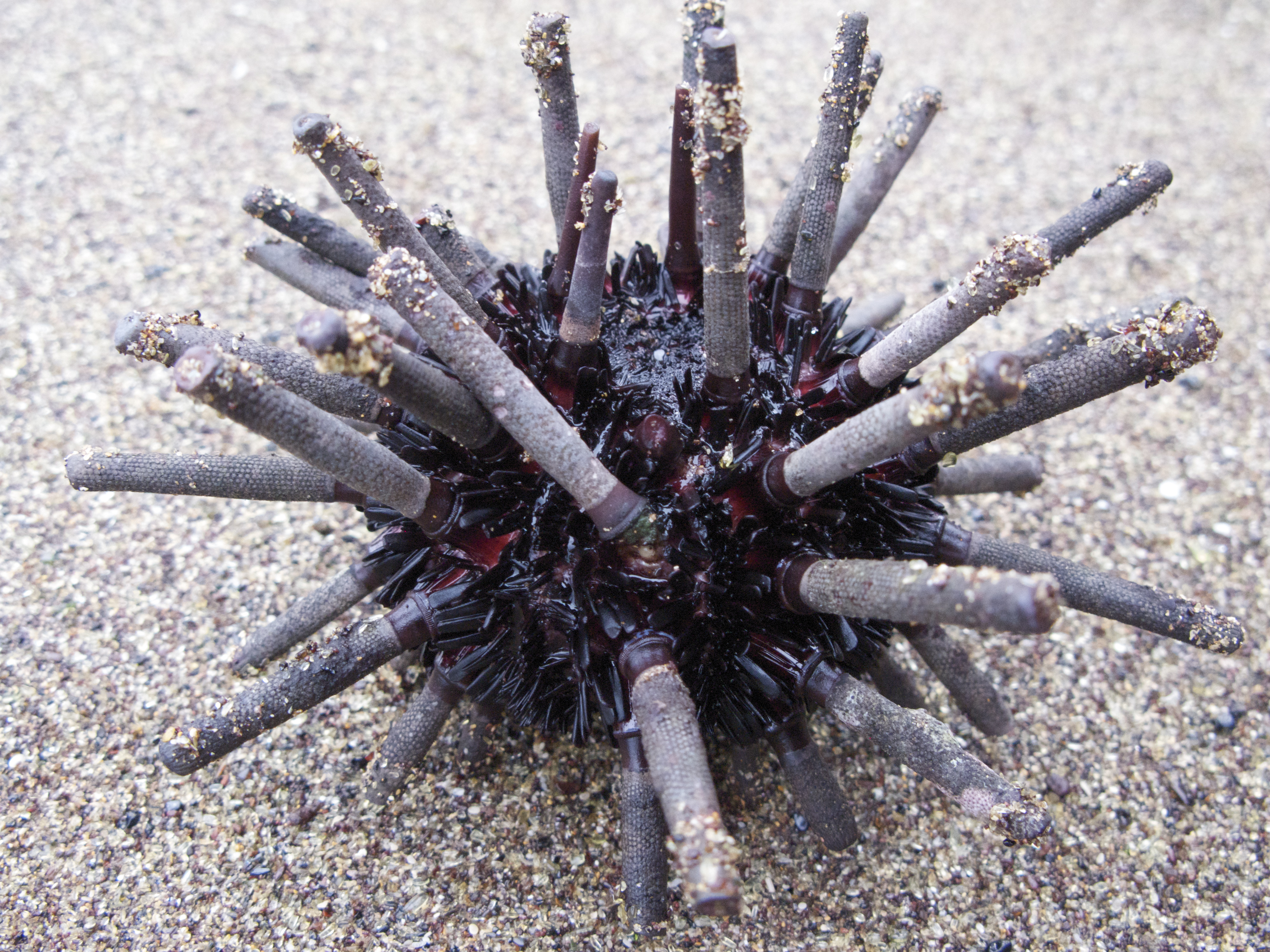
Eucidaris galapagensis
