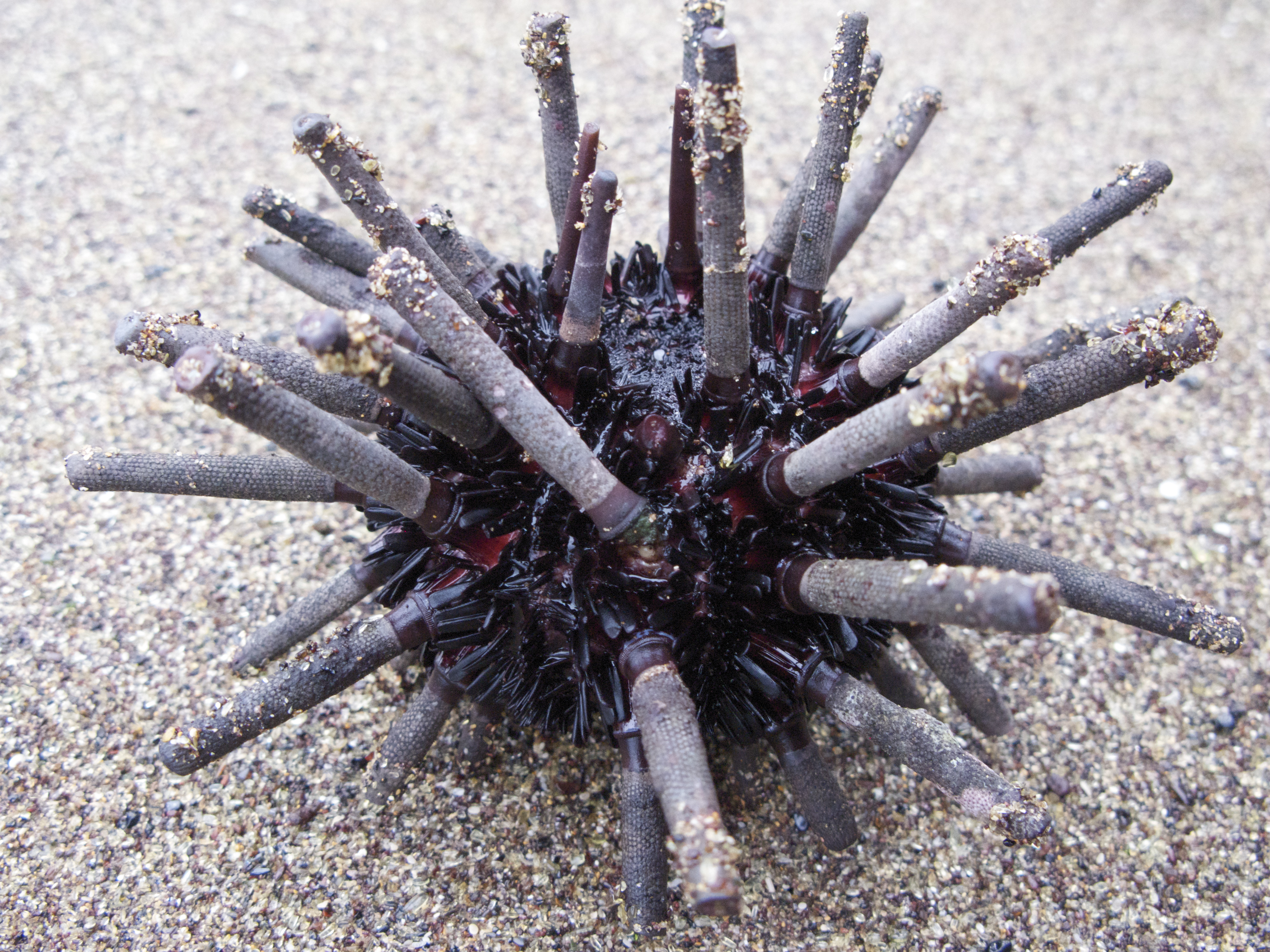
- Cidaroid urchin in Galapagos

Scientific classification
- Kingdom: Animalia
- Phylum: Echinodermata
- Class: Echinoidea
- Order: Cidaroida
- Family: Cidaridae
- Genus: Eucidaris
- Species: E. galapagensis

Binomial name
- Eucidaris galapagensis Döderlein, 1887

= Eucidaris galapagensis =

Species of sea urchin

Eucidaris galapagensis, commonly referred to as the slate pencil sea urchin, is a species of echinoderms in the family of Cidaroid. This sea urchin lives in coastal areas in the Galapagos, Clipperton, and Cocos. The preferred substrate of these organisms is rocky, benthic environments that provide refuge. In fact, greater abundance of Slate Pencil Sea Urchins is correlated with correct substrate, as well as greater food availability. Their diet is primarily herbivorous, however, they also consume various invertebrates. They graze heavily on live corals and algae in open, shallow reef habitats. Their grazing schedule is not restricted to sunlight availability, and will graze nocturnally. Their diversity in diet is a result of their metabolism, as they are capable of remarkably efficient assimilation of nutrients. Pencil Slate Sea Urchin's crawl omnidirectionally in their environment. Additionally, they are able to sense surrounding light by photoreceptor cells that act as their visual system.

== Biological importance ==
Echinoderms are critical components of marine communities, and Eucidaris Galapagensis is no different. The spines of the urchins provide habitat to diverse epifauna and act as a reservoir for diversity. The abundance of Eucidaris galapagensis is important, as they provide substrate and refuge from predators. Additionally, they exhibit a top-down control in the Galápagos Marine Reserve, and their presence may alter the sessile community composition. A significant amount, 90%, of the spines of the urchins are encrusted with diverse epifauna, and one urchin can host over 20 species. An interesting aspect of this reservoir is the potential of dispersal. Urchins are mobile organisms, they have the potential to redistribute the redistributed epifauna. However, when these urchins reach a great abundance, they are capable of causing a trophic cascade.

== Anthropogenic impacts ==
=== Climate events ===
As ectothermic organisms, Eucidaris Galapagensis, can be greatly impacted by climate events, such as El Nino's and climate change. In warmer environments, the metabolism and fitness of urchins can be population specific. Eucidaris Galapagensis are adapted and acclimated to short-term, local temperature fluctuations, and they have substantially greater thermal tolerances. Further, the grazing pressure of Eucidaris Galapagensis can exasperate the effect of climate events. Habitats suffering from climate impacts can be infiltrated by Eucidaris Galapagensis, resulting in “Urchin Barrens”, which are desolate, overgrazed coralline reefs that are replaced with algae. In fact, these events can lead to expansion of grazing urchins. An overabundance in urchins can interfere with the establishment of reef structure and, therefore, reduce reef growth.

=== Fishing ===
When fishing presence is not a threat, Eucidaris Galapagensis will exhibit larger size and ubiquitous occurrence. As a consequence, the Slate Pencil Sea Urchin population is maintained through predation, however, when the number of predators decreases as a result of fishing pressure, urchin density can increase. Historically, the removal of lobster and fish predators enhances the impacts of El Niño through the expansion of grazing Eucidaris galapagensis. This is why it is critical for fishing management to be proactive in reducing bycatch and excessive catch.

== Related species ==
Eucidaris Galapagensis was once identified as Eucidaris thouarsii, however due to genetic analysis, it is now recognized as a separate species.
