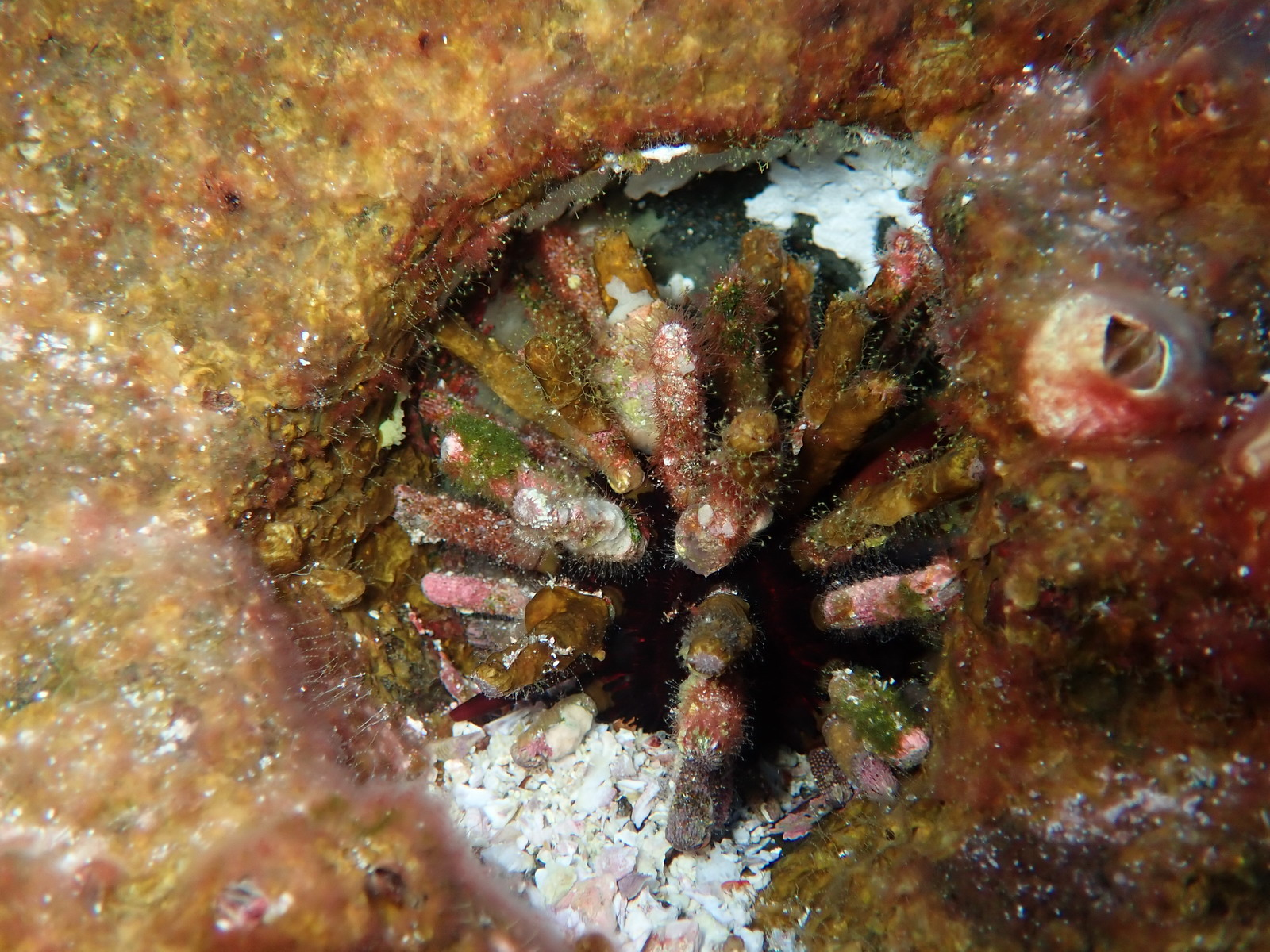
- Eucidaris thouarsii in the Gulf of California

Scientific classification
- Kingdom: Animalia
- Phylum: Echinodermata
- Class: Echinoidea
- Order: Cidaroida
- Family: Cidaridae
- Genus: Eucidaris
- Species: E. thouarsii

Binomial name
- Eucidaris thouarsii (Agassiz & Desor, 1846)

= Eucidaris thouarsii =

Species of sea urchin

Eucidaris thouarsii, the slate pencil urchin (named after slate pencil), is a species of cidaroid sea urchins that inhabits littoral regions of the East Pacific Ocean.

== Distribution and habitat ==
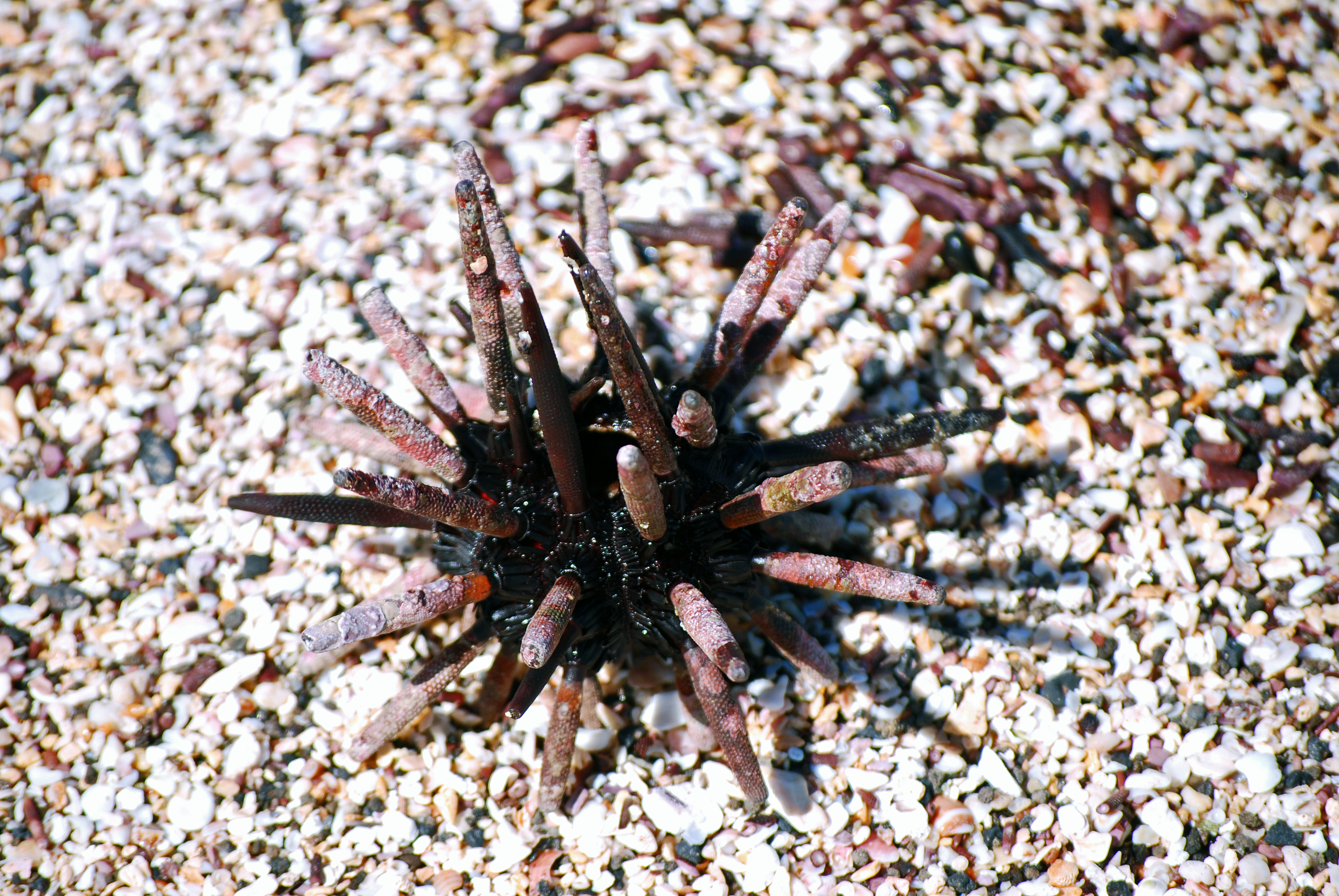
Eucidaris (thouarsii) galapagensis of the Galápagos, Clipperton and Cocos Islands was formerly included as a subspecies, but is now generally recognized as a separate species

Eucidaris thouarsii is found in the East Pacific at depths of 0–45 m (0–148 ft), ranging from Baja California to Panama, as well as Cocos Island, Clipperton Island and the Galápagos Islands. The Galápagos, Clipperton and Cocos populations are now often recognized as a separate species, E. galapagensis, instead of a subspecies of E. thouarsii.

== Diet ==
Like all urchins these are primarily herbivores, but feed on a wide range of invertebrates. This species has a high nutrient absorption efficiency when it comes to the coral Pocillopora damicornis, but would require a large intake to make nutrient requirements. Due to its high intake of coral, it reduces reef growth.
