= Slate (writing) =

Writing medium

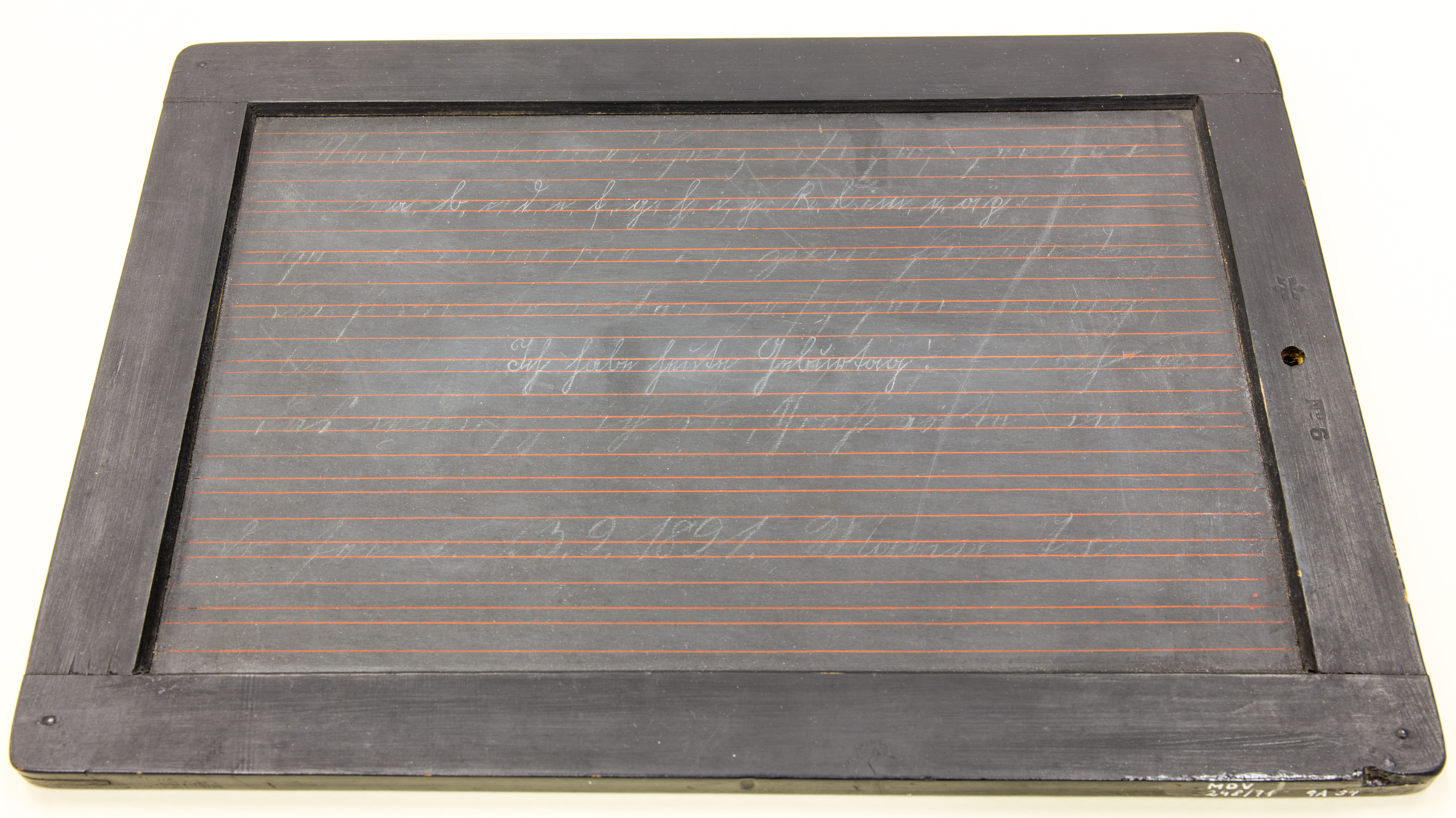
Slate with writing from 1894, used in Berlin, Germany, currently at the Museum Europäischer Kulturen

A slate is a thin piece of hard flat material, historically slate stone, which is used as a medium for writing on. Writing on a slate is impermanent and easily erased, and the same slate is then reused.

== Usage ==
The writing slate consisted of a piece of slate, typically either 4x6 inches or 7x10 inches, encased in a wooden frame. Split slate was prepared by scraping with a steel edge, grinding with a flat stone and, finally, polishing with a mix of slate powder in water. Pencils were of a softer stone, such as shale, chalk or soapstone. In 1853 Charles Goodyear patented a compound of hard-vulcanised rubber with powdered porcelain, from which to make white pencils for writing on slates.

Usually, a piece of cloth or slate sponge, sometimes attached with a string to the bottom of the writing slate, was used to erase it for reuse.

== History ==
The writing slate was in use in Indian schools as mentioned in Alberuni's Indica (Tarikh Al-Hind), written in the early 11th century:

They use black tablets for the children in the schools, and write upon them along the long side, not the broadside, writing with a white material from the left to the right.

The exact origins of the writing slate in Europe remain unclear. References to its use can be found in the fourteenth century and evidence suggests that it was used in the sixteenth and seventeenth centuries. The central time period for the writing slate, however, "appears to begin in the later eighteenth century, when developments in sea and land transport permitted the gradual expansion of slate quarrying in Wales and the growth of a substantial slate workshop industry."

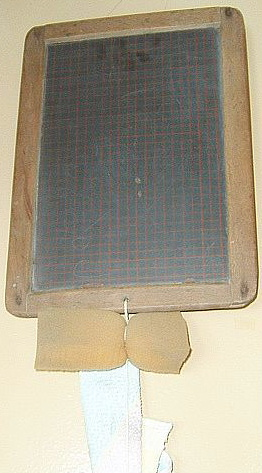
Slate with sponge (~1950)

By the nineteenth century, writing slates were used around the world in nearly every school and were a central part of the slate industry. At the dawn of the twentieth century, writing slates were the primary tool in the classroom for students. In the 1930s (or later) writing slates began to be replaced by more modern methods. However, writing slates did not become totally obsolete; they are still made in the twenty-first century, though in small quantities.

The writing slate was sometimes used by industry workers to track goods and by sailors to calculate their geographical location at sea. Sometimes multiple pieces of slate were bound together into a "book" and horizontal lines were etched onto the slate surface as a guide for neat handwriting.

== See also ==
- Clay tablet
- Blackboard
- Wax tablet

== Sources ==
- Davies, Peter (2005). "Writing Slates and Schooling". Australasian Historical Archaeology. 23: 63–69. JSTOR 29544535.
- Standard Sizes of Blackboard Slate. U.S. Department of Commerce, National Bureau of Standards. 1966.
